= 2015 Armenian constitutional referendum =

- 6 December 2015

Results
Choice	Votes	%
Yes	825,851	66.20%
No	421,600	33.80%
Valid votes	1,247,451	95.90%
Invalid or blank votes	53,332	4.10%
Total votes	1,300,783	100.00%
Registered voters/turnout	2,566,998	50.67%

A constitutional referendum was held in Armenia on 6 December 2015. Its amendments to the constitution put the country on a course from having a semi-presidential system to being a parliamentary republic, with the changes beginning to take place during the 2017–18 electoral cycle. The referendum passed with 66% of voters supporting it. Voter turnout was 51%, passing the 33% threshold to validate the results.

Opponents of the new constitution, who argued that the amendment was President Serzh Sargsyan's way to stay in power after the end of his second and last term in office, alleged that violence, coercion and electoral fraud were used to secure the vote.

== Background ==
After being drafted by the Specialised Commission on Constitutional Reforms, the proposed amendments were sent to the National Assembly on 21 August. On 5 October, the National Assembly voted 104–10, with three abstentions to put the proposals to a vote. The Republican Party of Armenia, Armenian Revolutionary Federation and Prosperous Armenia voted in favour, whilst the Armenian National Congress and Heritage voted against. The three abstainers were members of the Rule of Law, with two of the party's MPs voting against the proposals.

== Proposed changes ==
=== Changes in National Assembly ===
In the current constitution National Assembly controls the executive branch and is responsible for supervising the budget. Under the amendments, Armenian National Assembly is going to consist of at least 101 deputies, instead of 131.

Moreover, according to electoral law, four seats for ethnic minorities will be allocated, one each for Russians, Yezidis, Assyrians and Kurds, respectively. Additionally proportional electoral system is going to be used in the election of National Assembly.

Furthermore, under the amendments, the National Assembly may adopt a law on amnesty by majority vote of the total number of parliamentarians.

=== Changes in election and appointment of the Prime Minister and his duties ===
Within a three-day period of the commencement of the term of office of the newly elected National Assembly, the President of the Republic shall appoint as Prime Minister the candidate nominated by the parliamentary majority formed in the procedure prescribed by Article 89 of the Constitution. Within a seven-day period of accepting the Government's resignation in case of the Prime Minister submitting a resignation or the office of the Prime Minister becoming vacant, the Chairman of the National Assembly shall, based on the distribution of parliamentary seats and based on consultations with the parliamentary factions, nominate the prime-minister candidate that enjoys the confidence of the majority of parliamentarians. The National Assembly shall elect the Prime Minister by majority vote of the total number of parliamentarians. If a Prime Minister is not elected, a second round of the vote shall be held seven days after the vote, in which the prime-minister candidates nominated by the factions may take part. If a Prime Minister is not elected by majority vote of the total number of parliamentarians, the National Assembly shall be dissolved by virtue of law.

Formation of the government within a 10-day period of the appointment of the Prime Minister, the President of the Republic shall, by proposal of the Prime Minister, appoint the deputy prime ministers and the ministers. Within a 20-day period of the formation of the Government, the Prime Minister shall present to the National Assembly the program of the Government. The National Assembly shall approve the Program of the Government within a seven-day period by majority vote of the total number of parliamentarians. If the National Assembly does not approve the Program of the Government and does not elect a new Prime Minister in accordance with Paragraphs 2 and 3 of Article 148 of the Constitution, then the National Assembly shall be dissolved by virtue of law. If the National Assembly elects the Prime Minister, but once again does not approve the Program of the Government, the National Assembly shall be dissolved by virtue of law.

According to the previous constitution, the prime minister should supervise the Government activities and coordinate the work of the Ministers and should adopt decisions on the organization of the Government activities. According to the new constitution, The Prime Minister shall, within the framework of the Program of the Government, determine the general guidelines of the Government's policy, direct the activities of the Government, and coordinate the work of the Government members. On specific issues, the Prime Minister may give instructions to the Government members. The Prime Minister shall lead the Security Council, the procedure of formation and operation of which shall be prescribed by law.

==== Changes in judicial power ====
In the current Constitution, it is mentioned, that prosecutor's office is an integrated system. Moreover, the head of prosecutor's office is the Prosecutor General. This statement is the same in the draft of the new constitution. The way of the Prosecutor General's appointment is the main difference. By the Current Constitution, the Prosecutor General is appointed by the National Assembly for a six-year term. Additionally, the National Assembly shall have a recommendation from the President of the Republic. Unlike the current one, draft of the new constitution suggests another way of appointment. That is: Prosecutor General will be appointed by the National Assembly by three-fifths of major votes. However, the term is the same- six years. Both constitutions emphasize the point that the same person cannot be appointed Prosecutor General for more than two consecutive terms. Another alternation is connected with the way of impeachment of the Prosecutor General. The current constitution acclaims, that the Prosecutor General can be impeached only in the cases set by law, having the suggestion of the President. Moreover, the National Assembly must reach the required limit of votes. According to the new constitution, even without the suggestion of the President, National Assembly has the power to impeach the Prosecutor General, only in case of reaching the three-fifths of votes of ministers.

==== Changes in President's duties and responsibilities ====
The President of the Republic of Armenia shall be the head of the state. (Article 49, chapter 3)

According to the old Constitution:

The President of the Republic shall be elected by the citizens of the Republic of Armenia for a five year term of office. (Article 50, chapter 3)

The same person may not be elected for the post of the President of the Republic for more than two consecutive terms. (Article 50, chapter 3)

Every person having attained the age of thirty five, having been a citizen of the Republic of Armenia for the preceding ten years, having permanently resided in the Republic for the preceding ten years, and having the right to vote is eligible to be elected as President of the Republic. (Article 50, chapter 3)

However, according to the new constitution, the president is going to be elected for 7 years, and that person cannot be elected for more than 1 consecutive term.

Moreover, everyone who has attained the age of 40, has been a citizen of only the Republic of Armenia, has permanently resided in the Republic of Armenia for the preceding six years, and has voting right may be elected as President of the Republic.

==== Electoral process ====
Under the old constitution, the president was directly elected by the people. If the election involves more than two candidates and none of them receives more than half of the number of votes a second round of election shall be held on the fourteenth day following the voting. The two candidates having received the highest number of votes may participate in the second round of election of the President of the Republic. In the second round the candidate receiving the highest number of votes shall be elected President of the Republic. (Article 51, chapter 3)

However, according to the new constitution, The President of the Republic shall be elected by a College of Electors that consists of parliamentarians of the National Assembly and representatives elected by local self-government bodies from among them. The candidate who receives at least a three-fifths majority vote of total number of the Electoral College members shall be elected as President of the Republic. If no candidate receives such majority, a second round of the vote shall be conducted, in which all candidates that participated in the first round may participate. The candidate that receives more than half of the votes of the Electoral College members shall be elected as President of the Republic. If no candidate receives more than half of the votes of the Electoral College members in the second round, a third round of the vote shall be conducted, in which the two candidates that received the largest number of votes shall participate. In the third round, the candidate that receives more votes shall be elected as President of the Republic.

Furthermore, the President of the Republic of Armenia shall sign and publish a law adopted by the National Assembly. He or she shall apply to the Constitutional Court to determine the conformity of the law with the Constitution.. If the Constitutional Court decides that the law is in conformity with the Constitution, then the President of the Republic shall sign and publish the law within a five-day period.

== Criticism ==
The referendum has been nicknamed "Sargsyan's project" by critics because it would allow incumbent president Serzh Sargsyan to de facto remain in power after his second term if the ruling Republican Party wins the new parliamentary elections. Heritage party leader Raffi Hovannisian stated that the proposed constitutional reform is carried out to establish a single political party-state in Armenia.

== Positions of parliamentary parties ==
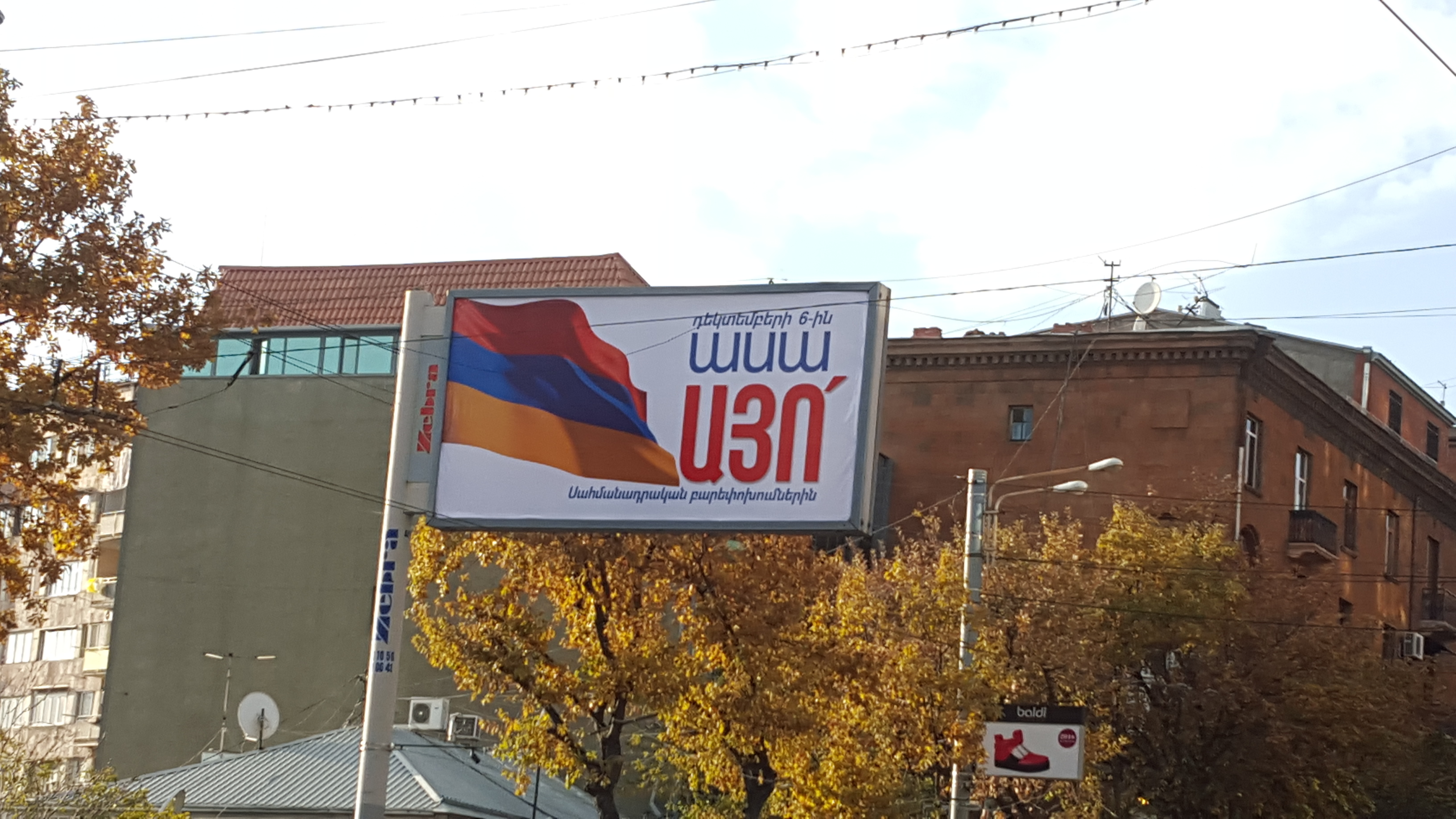
A billboard on Yerevan's Baghramyan Avenue advocating a yes vote

Yes

- Republican Party of Armenia (RPA-HHK)
- Prosperous Armenia (PAP-BHK)
- Armenian Revolutionary Federation (ARF-Dashnaktsutyun)

No

- Armenian National Congress (ANC)
- Heritage
- Rule of Law

== Endorsements ==
=== Minor (extra-parliamentary) parties ===
Yes

- Pan-Armenian National Movement
- Armenian Communist Party
- Ramkavar Liberal Party
- Social Democrat Hunchakian Party

No

- Union for National Self-Determination
- Hayazn

=== Individuals ===
No

- Robert Kocharyan, second President of Armenia (1998–2008)
- Hrant Bagratyan, economist, former Prime Minister (1993–96)
- Jirair Sefilian, Nagorno-Karabakh War veteran, political activist
- Vartan Oskanian, former foreign minister (1998–2008)
- Ara Papian, diplomat, former deputy foreign minister
- Paruyr Hayrikyan, Soviet dissident, political activist, former MP

== Opinion polls ==
Date	Poll source	Yes	No
24 November 2015	Advanced Public Research	35.8%	31.8%
10–21 September 2015	Gallup International	29.1%	26.1%

== Conduct ==
Levon Zourabian, who led the "No" camp, claimed there had been "mass cases of ballot-stuffing, violence, pressure, vote-buying". The European Platform for Democratic Elections reported "an unprecedented number of violations". In contrast, Russian observers reported that there were no violations or incidents during the voting.

== Results ==
Choice	Votes	%
For	825,851	66.20
Against	421,600	33.80
Total	1,247,451	100.00
Valid votes	1,247,451	95.90
Invalid/blank votes	53,332	4.10
Total votes	1,300,783	100.00
Registered voters/turnout	2,567,047	50.67
Source: Central Electoral Commission

== Reactions ==
Zourabian boycotted the following day's parliamentary session, and hundreds of protesters against the new constitution demonstrated in Yerevan. The Parliamentary Assembly of the Council of Europe deemed that the low turnout was due to the new constitution being in the interests of the government rather than the population, and decried what it saw as a lack of public debate preceding the vote. None of these allegations were supported by Russian electoral observers.

== Analysis ==
Hrant Mikayelian, researcher at the Caucasus Institute, noted the referendum was heavily falsified. According to one reconstruction attempt, the "no" camp actually won the referendum with 55.3% of the vote against the 44.7% of the vote for "yes.".

== See also ==
- 2015 Armenian anti-government protests
- Armenian presidential election, 2018
