= 2013 Armenian presidential election =

- 18 February 2013
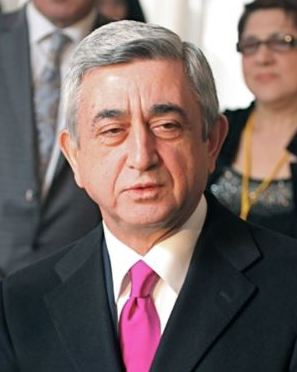

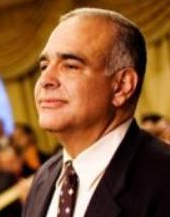
Nominee	Serzh Sargsyan	Raffi Hovannisian
Party	Republican	Heritage
Popular vote	861,160	539,672
Percentage	58.64%	36.75%
- Results by province Sargsyan: 40–50% 50-60% 60-70% 70-80% Hovannisian: 60-70%
President before election
Serzh Sargsyan
Republican
Elected President
Serzh Sargsyan
Republican

Presidential elections were held in Armenia on 18 February 2013. In the run-up to the elections, Armenia's first president Levon Ter-Petrosyan and Gagik Tsarukyan, leader of the second largest parliamentary party Prosperous Armenia, withdrew from the race in December 2012. Many believed that no candidate would be able to challenge incumbent president Serzh Sargsyan, others stated that people see "absence of alternatives" and these factors caused great apathy among the public.

On 31 January 2013, candidate Paruyr Hayrikyan was shot, but he recovered soon and urged two other main opposition candidates Raffi Hovannisian and Hrant Bagratyan to unite around a single opposition candidate, in order to defeat President Sargsyan. On 10 February, he appealed to the Constitutional Court with a request to postpone the election for 14 days and stated that he will take it back in case the three main opposition candidates decide to unite around a single candidate, but he withdrew the appeal the next day.

The elections resulted in a victory for incumbent President Sargsyan, who received 59% of the vote. Hovannisian came second with 37%, while the other candidates earned less than 4% of the total vote.

Sargsyan's main opponent Raffi Hovannisian claimed victory due to alleged electoral fraud. In days following the election, mass protests take place both in Yerevan (Freedom Square in particular) and other cities and towns throughout Armenia. Hovannisian urged Sargsyan to accept "people's victory" and concede his defeat. Hovannisian called the movement 'Barevolution', a portmanteau of 'barev' (բարև, 'hello') and 'revolution', referring to his habit of walking up to people and greeting them during the election campaign.

Although several countries (including the US, Russia, France, Iran, Turkey) congratulated Sargsyan on winning reelection, a number of influential politicians and political parties in Armenia (including the Armenian Revolutionary Federation, former President Levon Ter-Petrosyan, former Prime Ministers Aram Sargsyan and Hrant Bagratyan who came in third, former Minister of Foreign Affairs Vartan Oskanian, MP Nikol Pashinyan, Andrias Ghukasyan who came in fifth during the election) have publicly stated that Hovannisian had won the election and the official results are a product of electoral fraud.

On 10 March 2013, Hovannisian started a hunger strike in Freedom Square. On 14 March 2013, the Constitutional Court of Armenia issued a verdict confirming the victory of President Sargsyan. Hovannisian ended his hunger strike on 31 March 2013. A clash occurred between Hovannisian's supporters and the police forces on Baghramyan Avenue.

== Background ==
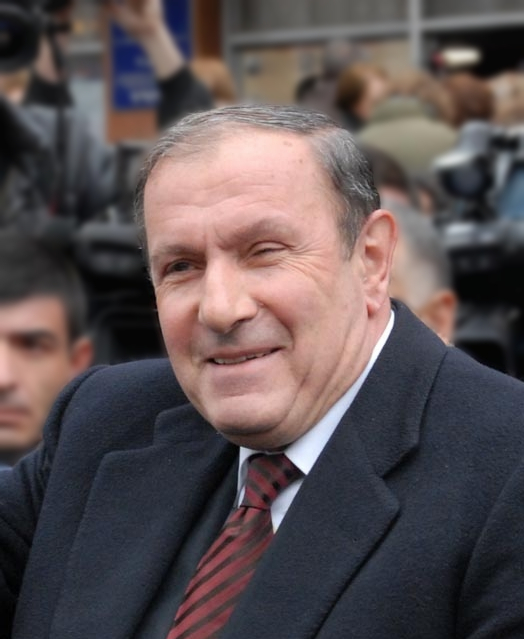
Armenia's first president Levon Ter-Petrosyan refused to run for president because of age.

The previous presidential election in Armenia was held in February 2008. Sargsyan was announced president with 52.8% of the popular vote. Armenia's first president, Levon Ter-Petrosyan, finished second with 21.5%. Immediately after the results were announced, thousands of Ter-Petrosyan's supporters gathered in Yerevan's Freedom Square to protest against electoral fraud. Eventually, the police and the army (allegedly) clashed with the protesters, resulting in the death of ten people (eight protesters and two policemen).

Less than a year earlier—in May 2012—Armenians voted in parliamentary elections. The ruling Republican Party of Armenia of President Sargsyan won a majority and formed government. Besides the Republican Party's close partner Rule of Law, the other four parties that won seats in parliament, did not recognize the legitimacy of the May election. On 15 December 2012, the Republican Party officially nominated Serzh Sargsyan as the party candidate. In December 2012, the second and third largest parties represented in the National Assembly announced that they would not nominate candidates, nor will support candidates in the upcoming election. First on 12 December 2012, Prosperous Armenia, the second largest party in parliament, announced their decision. While on 25 December 2012, Armenia's first president Levon Ter-Petrosyan announced that he would not participate in the upcoming election, though it was initially announced that Ter-Petrosyan would be the candidate of the Armenian National Congress (ANC). In May 2012, ANC speaker Levon Zurabyan said that the ANC does not have a better candidate for presidency than Ter-Petrosyan.

On 26 December 2012, the Armenian Revolutionary Federation announced their decision not to nominate a candidate. Thus, three major extra-parliamentary parties—the ARF, ANC and Prosperous Armenia—did not participate in this election.

Meanwhile, the Green Party of Armenia endorsed Hrant Bagratyan for the presidency.

== Candidates ==
Seven candidates were registered:

- Hrant Bagratyan, the leader of Freedom Party, Prime Minister of Armenia from 1993 to 1996, a member of the Armenian National Congress
- Andrias Ghukasyan, a political analyst, Radio Hay director
- Paruyr Hayrikyan, former Soviet dissident, leader of the Union for National Self-Determination party
- Raffi Hovannisian, the first Foreign Minister of Armenia (1991-1992), leader of the Heritage party
- Arman Melikyan, candidate in the 2008 presidential election
- Serzh Sargsyan, the incumbent President elected in the disputed 2008 election, leader of ruling Republican Party
- Vardan Sedrakyan, an epic poetry expert

== Campaign ==
The campaign started on 21 January and ended on 16 February 2013.

On 8 February 2013, Aram Harutyunyan, the leader of the National Conciliation Party, after a one-day hunger strike, submitted a withdrawal statement.

Ghukasyan's hunger strike

One of the candidates, Andrias Ghukasyan started a hunger strike in front of the National Academy of Sciences building on 21 January 2013, demanding to "Stop Fake Elections".

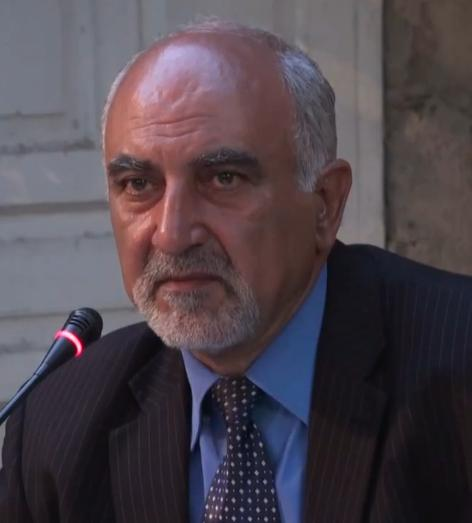
Paruyr Hayrikyan was shot in right clavicle during the election campaign

Hayrikyan's assassination attempt

On 31 January 2013, just before midnight, candidate Paruyr Hayrikyan was shot in his right clavicle. He was taken to hospital. The doctors saved his life and two days later he was already able to give an interview in the hospital.

President Sarksyan stated that "those who were behind this crime aimed to affect the natural flow of elections", and continued that "this outrageous crime is directed not only against presidential candidate and statesman Hayrikyan but against our security." Hayrikyan, who was campaigning on a platform of taking a more pro-Western foreign policy accused a foreign secret service agency of the attack, possibly Russia, the country's traditional supporter. "I suspect a secret service of a foreign country... I said clearly that there was no alternative for us and we should move closer to Europe. We've had more harm than advantage from imperialistic Russia... I suggest that the assassination attempt is linked to these statements." The Organization for Security and Co-operation in Europe (OSCE) expressed concern over the incident. Ambassador Janez Lenarcic, the Director of the OSCE Office for Democratic Institutions and Human Rights, said: "This attack is deeply distressing in view of the electoral process already under way, and I urge all stakeholders to refrain from any actions that might further aggravate the situation."

The election could have been postponed by two weeks according to the Electoral Law of Armenia, but on 5 February 2013, Hayrikyan made it clear that he will not appeal to the Constitutional Court with such request.

Hayrikyan's open letter to Hovannisian and Bagratyan

On 9 February 2013, the injured presidential candidate Paruyr Hayrikyan announced about his decision to postpone the election for 14 days, using his right given by the Armenian Constitution. He called two other major opposition candidates Raffi Hovannisian and Hrant Bagratyan to unite around a single opposition candidate. Hayrikyan stated that, "if I postpone the elections for 14 days, we will still have the chance to propose a common candidate, to develop the final points of the pre-election projections and to present ourselves in the public ten more days like a unity. And in that case, our common percentage will reach not only 70%, but even more—80%."

Appeal to the Constitutional court

Despite his previous statements, presidential candidate Paruyr Hayrikyan, who was shot on 31 January 2013, appealed to the court on 10 February 2013. His aide stated "We've applied the Constitutional Court with a request to postpone the election for two weeks due to Paruyr Hayrikyan's health problems and the fact that he can't campaign."

While filing the request, Hayrikyan stated that in case Raffi Hovannisian and Hrant Bagratyan come together and decide to unite, he will take his request back. He in particular said "Should it happen [the unification] my right to equal competition would be breached, but it would be compensated by the creation of a united team. Moreover, the state would avoid additional expenses and the timetable of numerous observers would not be disrupted, otherwise I am obliged to hold a complete campaign during those two weeks along with the other candidates’ participation." The court will make a decision in four days. The Constitutional Court must rule within four days on whether to delay the vote - a decision which largely depended on doctors' evaluation of whether the candidate was well enough to campaign.

On 11 February 2013, however, Hayrikyan took his application back form the Constitutional Court.

Attacks on journalists and reporters

Several journalists were physically attacked while reporting on the electoral campaign. Nobody was prosecuted by the police, due to "lack of evidence".

== Opinion polls ==
Source	Date of Polling	Sargsyan	Hovannisian	Bagratyan	Hayrikyan	Others	Notes
TNS opinion/EuFoA/IPSC	31 Jan–5 Feb 2013	58	33	2.8	4.9	1.3	of the decided voters
Baltic Surveys/Gallup	25 Jan–2 Feb 2013	69	11	5	5	10	of the decided voters
VTSIOM	25–29 Jan 2013	61	27	4	5	3	of the decided voters
Baltic Surveys/Gallup	15–23 Jan 2013	66	10	4	4	1.6	16% were undecided
TNS Opinion/EuFo/IPSC	15–20 Jan 2013	68.6	20.8	5	5	1.5	of the decided voters
Sociometer	31 Dec 2012	72	20	5.6	3	1.4	of the decided voters

=== Criticism ===
Many have questioned the reliability of opinion polls in Armenia, including the three main opposition candidates Raffi Hovannisian, Hrant Bagratyan and Paruyr Hayrikyan. For instance, Bagratyan called the Gallup International Association "fake Gallup" (սուտի Գելափ) in the interview to the Armenian service of Radio Free Europe/Radio Liberty, making a reference to the organization's dispute with Gallup, Inc. over the name. The comedy show ArmComedy, named their 79th episode "Albert Adibunts", referring to the head of Sociometer center, Aharon Adibekyan, who is often criticized by opposition politicians.

=== Open-access polls ===
Several open-access polls (such as online polls) were conducted in this election. A special website was created for this purpose, Elect.am. According to the results there, of more than 4,700 voters, President Sargsyan had only 15% of the total vote, while his main opponent Raffi Hovannisian had about 40%, Hrant Bagratyan 11% and Paruyr Hayrikyan 4%. The epic poetry expert Vardan Sedrakyan got 26% of the vote, mainly by people who don't prefer any of the candidates.

Another poll was conducted in the website of Aravot daily. In the poll there, Sargsyan had 12% of the vote, while Hovannisian had 32%, Bagratyan 17%, Hayrikyan 4%.

=== Exit polls ===
The Baltic Surveys/The Gallup Organization held an exit poll, the results were: 58% Sargsyan, 32% Hovannisian.

== Results ==
The main support of Hovannisian was from urban areas, particularly in the second and third largest cities of Armenia, Gyumri and Vanadzor, where Hovannisian won overwhelming support of the voters. He also won in the cities of Ashtarak, Ijevan, Armavir, Ejmiatsin, Nor Hachn, Abovyan, Spitak, Akhuryan, Artik, Kapan, Yeghegnadzor, Noyemberyan. Besides provincial towns, Hovannisian also won in three districts of Yerevan: Avan, Arabkir and Ajapnyak.

The results in rural areas was the opposite. There, Sargsyan won by far. Sargsyan received major support from Yerevan’s Erebuni and Nubarashen districts where an army unit is located.

Candidate	Party	Votes	%
Serzh Sargsyan	Republican Party	861,160	58.64
Raffi Hovannisian	Heritage	539,672	36.75
Hrant Bagratyan	Freedom Party	31,643	2.15
Paruyr Hayrikyan	Union for National Self-Determination	18,093	1.23
Andrias Ghukasyan	Independent	8,328	0.57
Vardan Sedrakyan	Independent	6,203	0.42
Arman Melikyan	Independent	3,516	0.24
Total		1,468,615	100.00
Valid votes		1,468,615	96.64
Invalid/blank votes		50,988	3.36
Total votes		1,519,603	100.00
Registered voters/turnout		2,528,773	60.09
Source: Central Electoral Commission

== Claims of electoral irregularities ==
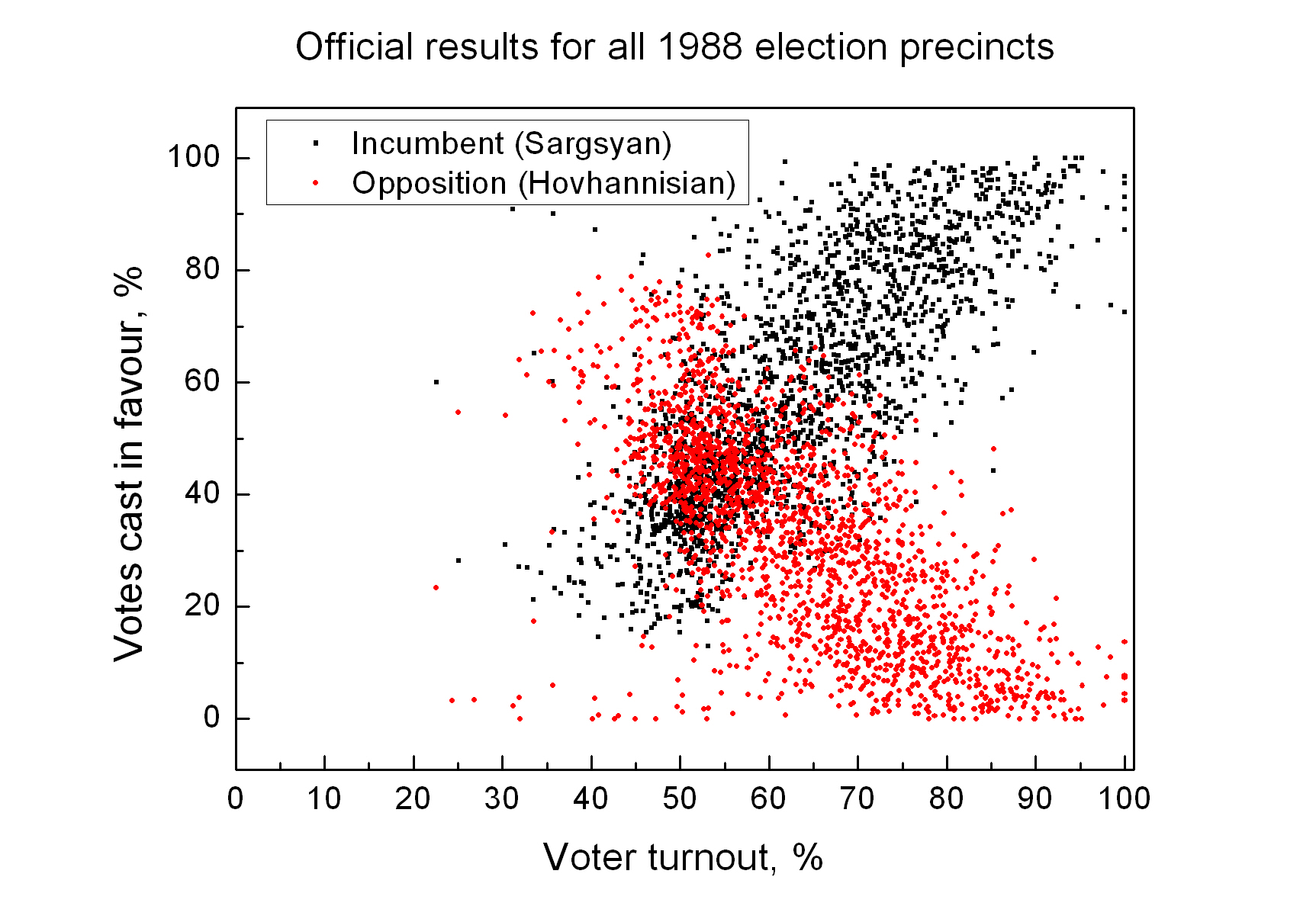
OSCE observer mission cited "a correlation between very high turnout and the number of votes for the incumbent" as a reason for "concerns regarding the confidence over the integrity of the electoral process".

Several opposition politicians claimed there were irregularities with the voting list. Raffi Hovannisian talked about the high possibility of fraud, caused by the fact that "700,000 Armenian citizens are on voter lists in the country, but work outside this impoverished nation."

Before the election campaign, the OSCE/ODIHR mission recommended the authorities to "toughen legal punishment for vote buying and other irregularities and make voter lists more accurate."

During and after the election, numerous cases of violations of the electoral code were reported. Raffi Hovannisian's campaign headquarters reported over 100 violations, including open ballot (non-secret) voting, voter pressuring, multiple voting, etc.

One of the local observer organizations "iDitord" created an online map of about 400 documented irregularities before and during the election day and vote counting. These include vote buying, voter intimidation, inconsistencies in voter lists, violations of voting procedures and other fraudulent activities.

Amnesty International issued a public statement listing numerous irregularities during the elections and saying "Amnesty International calls on the relevant authorities to carry out prompt and impartial investigations into all allegations of rights violations during the elections and hold those responsible to account. The authorities must also guarantee the safety of participants at post-election protests and public meetings."

=== OSCE observation mission ===
On 2 March 2013, the Organization for Security and Cooperation in Europe election observers' report pointed out that there is "a correlation between very high turnout and the number of votes for the incumbent", which "raises concerns regarding the confidence over the integrity of the electoral process." The mission stated that in many precincts, mainly in rural areas, the turnout was “implausibly high”. The opposition claims that this is a result of excessive use of administrative resources in remote rural areas and a fact that "mayors kept villagers in total fear."

On 5 March, Ireland's former Minister for Justice, OSCE observer, Dermot Ahern wrote a letter where he talked about an evident discrepancy between the results he personally witnessed during the vote counting in Precinct 26/1 and the final official results. Among other inconsistencies he noted, "I could not understand then and still now how invalid votes can become valid." Which made him to conclude that "I feel that full re-examination of this count should take place."

== Reaction ==
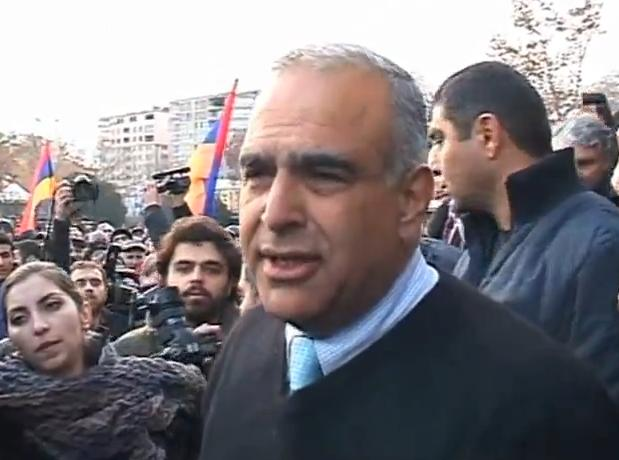
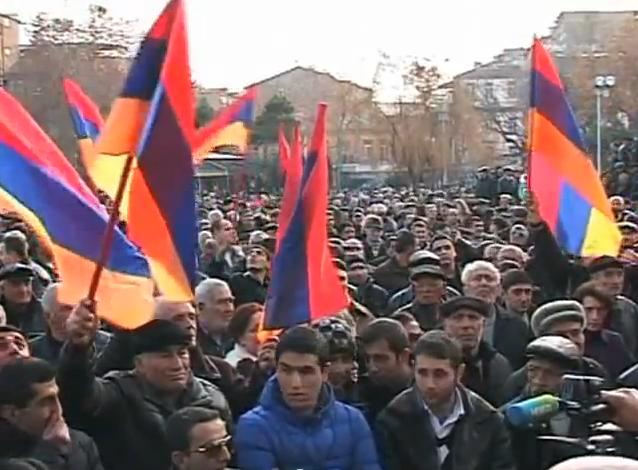
Hovannisian and his supporters protest in Freedom Square, Yerevan on 20 February 2013

=== Hovannisian ===
Runner-up Raffi Hovannisian didn't recognize the legitimacy of the election and on the night of 18 February 2013, he claimed victory in a press conference, stating "We all know that we have won", continuing "for the first time in 20 years the citizens have said yes to our constitution, to the rule of law, to democracy and our future."

Mass rallies continued, while on 10 March Hovannisian started a hunger strike and called on Sargsyan to resign.

=== Armenian diaspora ===
Groups of the Armenian diaspora protested the results and alleged fraud in front of the Armenian consulates in New York, Los Angeles, Paris, Brussels and other major American and European cities.

Serj Tankian, lead singer of Grammy award-winning Armenian-American rock band System of a Down, wrote an open letter to incumbent Sargsyan saying "it's time for change" after non-government organizations reported widespread voting fraud. "Citizens across Armenia are protesting the outcome of the elections and the injustice inherent in the political establishment." He also urged Sargsyan to protect the country from its enemies as "Those who steal elections from my people are domestic enemies that need to be punished."

=== International ===
Supranational bodies

- European Union — President of the European Commission José Manuel Barroso congratulated Sargsyan stating that he welcomes "the improved conduct of the elections and further progress in efforts to bring the democratic process into line with international standards."
- Council of Europe — Secretary General Thorbjørn Jagland in his congratulatory message stated that he is confident that Sargsyan will "pursue the on-going process of reforms to which you and your country are already committed, with a view to securing its democratic stability and to ensuring full respect for the Rule of Law and for Human Rights in Armenia."
- NATO — Secretary General Anders Fogh Rasmussen stated that NATO welcomes "the progress made by Armenia since the last elections and trust further steps will be undertaken to address the remaining deficiencies.”

United States

- United States — State Department spokesman Victoria Nuland stated the US "congratulates the people of Armenia on their February 18 presidential elections, which were judged by international observers to be generally well-administered and characterized by a respect for fundamental freedoms, including those of assembly and expression."

On 25 February 2013, Secretary of State John Kerry congratulated Sargsyan on reelection and hoped that Armenia will continue "to increase transparency, promote multiple viewpoints in the mainstream media, and encourage citizens’ active participation in reforms and governance, as well as address the outstanding electoral issues raised by the OSCE."
On 2 March 2013, President Barack Obama sent a congratulatory message to Sargsyan. President Obama said he looks "forward to continuing our work together as we both begin our second terms."
Other countries

- Russia — President Vladimir Putin congratulated Sargsyan on winning reelection.
- Georgia — President Mikheil Saakashvili congratulated Sargsyan.
- Iran — Mahmoud Ahmadinejad congratulated Sargsyan and wished "prosperity and glory" to the Armenian nation.
- Turkey — President Abdullah Gül congratulated Sargsyan.
- France — French President François Hollande congratulated Sargsyan. His message read "I am confident that it will strengthen your resolve to shape a democratic, stable and prosperous Armenia, which is living in peace with all of its neighbors."
- Germany — Chancellor Angela Merkel congratulated Sargsyan and noted that she is confident that Sargsyan "will allow to improve Armenia’s relations with its neighboring countries on the east as well as on the west."
- United Kingdom — British PM David Cameron congratulated Sargsyan, wishing "the best as you begin your second term in office. I look forward to our two Governments working together for the mutual benefit of both our countries."
- Ukraine — Viktor Yanukovych congratulated Sargsyan and stated that his "years-long work and efforts aimed at the improvement of the living standards of the Armenian people have been once again broadly supported by the citizens of Armenia."

Other heads of states who congratulated Sargsyan include President of Belarus Alexander Lukashenko, President of Lithuania Dalia Grybauskaitė, President of Lebanon Michel Suleiman, President of Slovakia Ivan Gašparovič, President of Egypt Mohamed Morsi, President of Israel Shimon Peres, President of the Swiss Confederation Ueli Maurer, President of the Hellenic Republic Karolos Papoulias, President of the Socialist Republic of Vietnam Truong Tan Sang, President of Uzbekistan Islam Karimov, President of Tajikistan Emomali Rahmon, former President of Slovenia Danilo Türk.

==== Criticism ====
Hovannisian, who disputes the election's legitimacy, denounced the congratulatory messages of foreign countries, stating that they "can say whatever they want" and that he will allow nobody to "teach me lessons of American, Western or Russian democracy and law because the Armenian citizens are the masters of our country."
