= Aravot =

Newspaper in Armenia

- Cover of Aravot on December 13, 2024
- Type: Daily newspaper
- Editor-in-chief: Aram Abrahamyan; Anna Israelyan (website editor)
- Founded: August 2, 1994 (first issue)
- Political alignment: Liberal, independent
- Language: Armenian; Website available in Armenian, Russian, and English
- Headquarters: Arshakunyats Avenue, Building 2a, 15th Floor, Yerevan, Armenia
- Circulation: 150,293 (as of 2018)
- Website: www.aravot.am

Aravot (Armenian: «Առավոտ», "Morning") is a leading liberal and politically independent daily newspaper based in Yerevan, Armenia. It was founded in 1994. Its editor-in-chief is Aram Abrahamyan.

== History and political alignment ==
Sources differ on who founded the newspaper. Some hold it was the newspaper's long-time editor Aram Abrahamyan, others believe it was the controversial Interior Minister Vano Siradeghyan, while still others refer to a general "editorial staff". Its first issue was published on August 2, 1994. At the time its editor-in-chief was Ignat Mamyan. Aram Abrahamyan replaced him in December 1994.

Year	Circulation
1999	60,000
2003	107,000
2018	150,293

Sources generally agree that Aravot was supportive of President Levon Ter-Petrosyan (1991-1998) and his liberal party Pan-Armenian National Movement (HHSh), although it gave space to different points of view. Abrahamyan denied that he was close to Ter-Petrosyan and his government in a 2004 interview and added: "Go and ask the former government what they think about Aravot. You'll realize that their attitude is anything but positive."

The newspaper was highly critical of the government of President Robert Kocharyan (1998-2008). During the 2003 presidential election Aravot "allocated 37% of its coverage to the incumbent President Kocharyan, with an overwhelmingly negative tone."

Following the deadly 2008 presidential election protests, Aravot was prevented by security forces from being published according to a March 1 state of emergency decree signed by outgoing President Kocharyan. It was not until March 21 when the de facto media blackout was lifted along with the state of emergency that Aravot resumed publication. In addition, the newspaper's website (aravot.am) was blocked during that period.

Aravot has been critical of President Serzh Sargsyan, who came to power in the disputed 2008 election.

During the 2013 presidential election, the newspaper's editor-in-chief Aram Abrahamyan publicly endorsed the liberal former Prime Minister Hrant Bagratyan, but stated that it's only his personal opinion and not that of the newspaper.

In a 2014 interview, Abrahamyan stated that the newspaper's ultimate goal is to create a "mild and tolerant" atmosphere in the Armenian society.

According to a research conducted in October–November 2014 by the Yerevan-based Region Research Center, in their reporting, Aravot.am had the second highest number of negative descriptions of Russia at 40%, but also the highest in terms of positive descriptions at 19%.

== Reception ==
=== Acclaim ===
According to a 2012 study, Aravot was the "more neutral and objective" of all Armenian newspapers.

Military analyst Vahram Mirakyan praised Aravot for being more balanced in their articles about the Armenian Army than other independent or opposition newspapers. Although the majority of articles were negative in their content, they were largely devoid of "libels" and had more neutral and positive articles than the other newspaper monitored in the study.

In 2014, Raffi Hovannisian praised Aravot for its professionalism and unbiased reporting.

=== Criticism ===
In 2005, Liana Sayadyan of Hetq Online wrote that Aravot is not an independent newspaper since it was established by former Interior Minister Vano Siradeghyan. She also suggested that Abrahamyan "does not hide his admiration for the former government. Hence, Aravot has not been independent from the start, and Vano Siradeghyan himself confessed on more than one occasion that by publishing Aravot he hoped to reestablish the popularity" of HHSh.

Staff

Aravot's current staff include Aram Abrahamyan, Anna Israelyan, Emma Gabrielyan, Margarit Harutyunyan, Gohar Hakobyan, Nelli Grigoryan, Melanya Barseghyan, Tatev Harutyunyan, Roza Hovhannisyan, Ruzan Minasyan, Arpine Simonyan, Arsen Aivazian, Nune Arevshatyan and Armen Davtyan.

== See also ==
- List of newspapers in Armenia
- Media of Armenia
