= 2011 Armenian protests =

Series of political protests

- Part of the impact of the Arab Spring
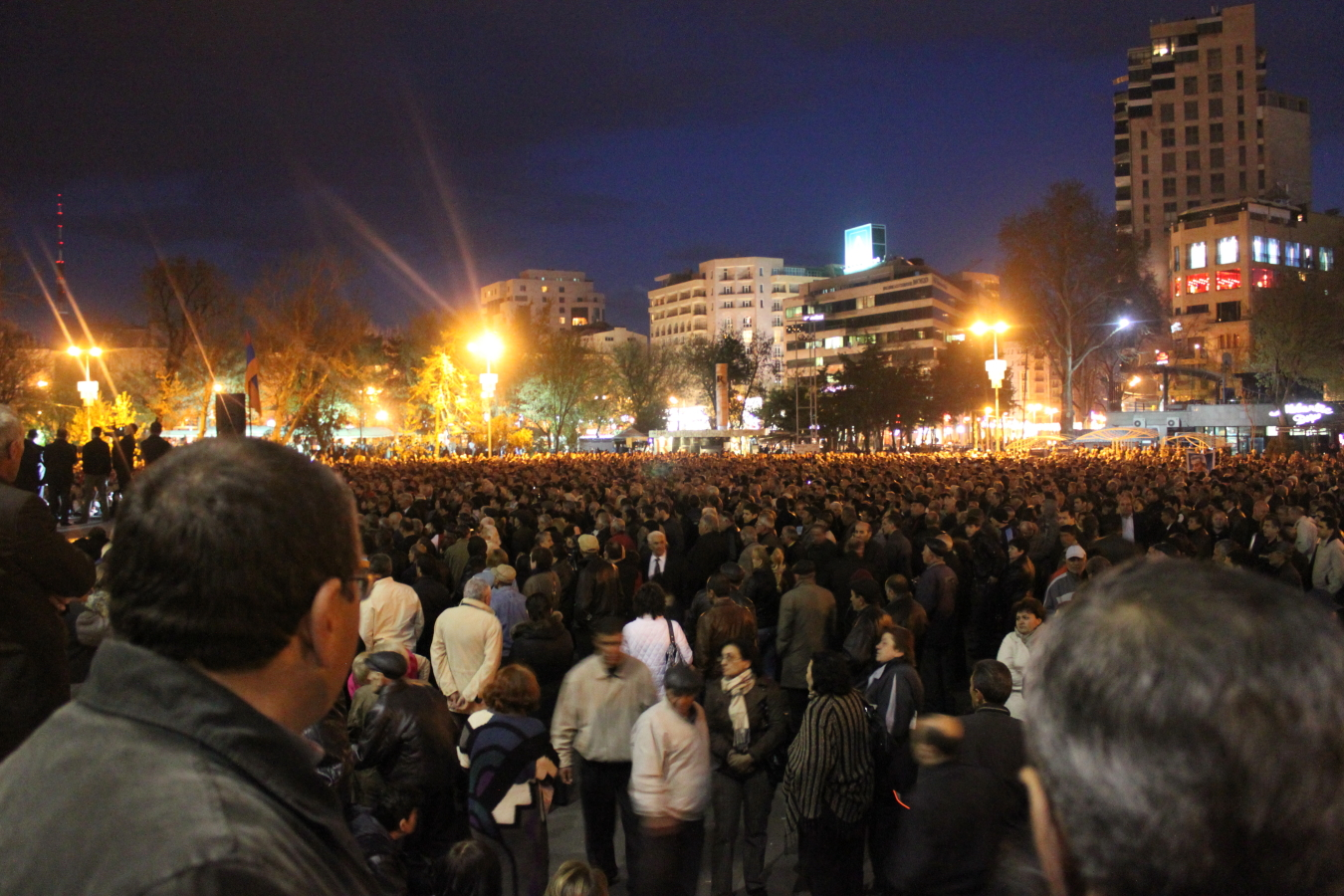
- A protest in Yerevan's Freedom Square on 8 April 2011
- Date: 19 January – 25 November 2011 (10 months and 6 days)
- Location: Yerevan, Armenia
- Caused by: political repression; corruption; unemployment; low wages; disputed legitimacy of the 2008 presidential election; street trading ban
- Goals: democratic reforms; release of political prisoners; early general elections; resignation of the government; investigation into alleged crimes against opposition members; street trading legalization
- Methods: demonstrations; hunger strikes; online activism; sit-ins; town hall meetings
- Result: relaxation of free assembly restrictions; relitigation of allegations of crimes against opposition members; promised judicial reforms; permission for opposition rally in Freedom Square; amnesty for political prisoners

Parties
(Armenia) Political opposition; Armenian National Congress; Heritage	Government of Armenia; Police; Republican Party of Armenia

Lead figures
Levon Ter-Petrosyan; Nikol Pashinyan; Raffi Hovannisian	Serzh Sargsyan (President); Tigran Sargsyan (PM)

Number
tens of thousands	up to few hundreds

Casualties
- Arrested: 2+

The 2011 Armenian protests were a series of civil demonstrations aimed at provoking political reforms and concessions from both the government of Armenia and the civic government of Yerevan, its capital and largest city. Protesters demanded President Serzh Sargsyan release political prisoners, prosecute those responsible for the deaths of opposition activists after the 2008 presidential election and institute democratic and socioeconomic reforms, including the right to organise in Freedom Square in downtown Yerevan. They also protested against Yerevan Mayor Karen Karapetyan for banning the opposition from Freedom Square and barring vendors and traders from the city streets. The opposition bloc Armenian National Congress, which has played a major role in organising and leading the demonstrations, had also called for a snap election and the resignation of the government.

The government granted several concessions to the protesters, including agreeing to the opposition's terms for an inquiry into the 2008 protest deaths, granting them a permit to rally in Freedom Square, and releasing several imprisoned opposition activists.

== Timeline of protests ==
=== Street vendor protests ===
Street vendors in Yerevan, angry over Mayor Karapetyan's decision on 13 January to start enforcing a strict ban on street trading, protested outside the municipal offices of the capital city on 19 January. City officials insisted the ban was necessary for public health and safety, but demonstrators shouted slogans criticizing Karapetyan, a Republican Party of Armenia official elected by the municipal assembly in December 2010 to finish out an incomplete term, and complaining that the municipality's ban has prevented many of them from making enough money to pay for food and shelter for themselves and their families. Some protesters, many of whose signs emphasized their peaceful intentions, called upon Karapetyan to either meet with them or resign. The protests in front of the municipal offices soon became a daily phenomenon stretching into February.

=== Political protests ===
With minor protests in Yerevan continuing and a revolutionary wave spreading throughout North Africa and Western Asia, opposition politicians like Stepan Safaryan of the Heritage party and former President Levon Ter-Petrosyan, who was defeated by now-President Sargsyan in the disputed 2008 election, of the Armenian National Congress (HAK) suggested in early February that political upheaval could come to Armenia. Ter-Petrosyan called for an opposition rally in Yerevan's Freedom Square on 18 February not just to protest the Karapetyan administration, but to protest the government of President Serzh Sargsyan. The government responded by saying Liberty Square would be off-limits due to "sports and cultural events". The HAK said it planned to rally in the square regardless of whether the city government and the national government allowed it to do so. Political analysts said national opposition leaders like Ter-Petrosyan were harnessing an existing wave of unrest inspired by the Tunisian Revolution and protests in Egypt and evident in such events as the ongoing street vendor protests, with some predicting that the conditions were right for major protests to gain traction.

==== 18 February ====
On 18 February, the Armenian National Congress held a major protest drawing between 5,000 and 10,000 in the city center of Yerevan. The protesters, including Ter-Petrosyan, complained of low wages, unemployment, inflation, corruption, and a falling quality of living. Speakers at the rally also invoked the specter of the Tunisian and Egyptian revolutions, and Ter-Petrosyan compared the Sargsyan administration to those fallen regimes. "The plight of our people is no better than the plight of the peoples of those countries, and Armenia's regime is no less dictatorial and hated than the regimes in those countries," the former president said. He urged the government to resign and called for an uprising similar to those seen in Arab countries near Armenia. Ter-Petrosyan also called on street vendors and others already organizing in protest of government policies to "politicize" their rallies and join with the national opposition in calling for sweeping changes.

==== 1 March ====
The Armenian National Congress organized another rally in Yerevan on 1 March. According to estimates of the opposition, the rally was attended by over 50,000 citizens. The rally marked the third anniversary of post-election violence after Sargsyan's disputed victory in 2008, when 10 protesters were killed. Protesters again demanded early elections and called for Sargsyan to resign. Ter-Petrosyan spoke at the rally, calling the government a "bandit regime [that] seized power through falsified parliamentary and presidential elections and the bloody crime committed on 1 March 2008" and reiterating the demands aired at the 18 February protest. He also publicly called for the ban on street trading to be lifted and demanded economic reforms, including a higher minimum wage and unemployment benefits.

==== 3 March ====
About 50 street vendors backed by members of both the opposition party Heritage and the Armenian National Congress, including members of parliament, gathered outside a government building in Yerevan. Police moved to disperse them, resulting in a number of clashes. One HAK activist was arrested and one of the Heritage MPs was hospitalized with injuries. In defiance of a statement from Prime Minister Tigran Sargsyan promising an internal investigation into the allegations of police brutality, the police publicly blamed the MPs for inciting violence. The incident prompted renewed comparisons of the Karapetyan and Sargsyan administrations' policies to pre-revolutionary Tunisia by some analysts and opposition parliamentarians.

==== 15 March – "Fast for Freedom" ====
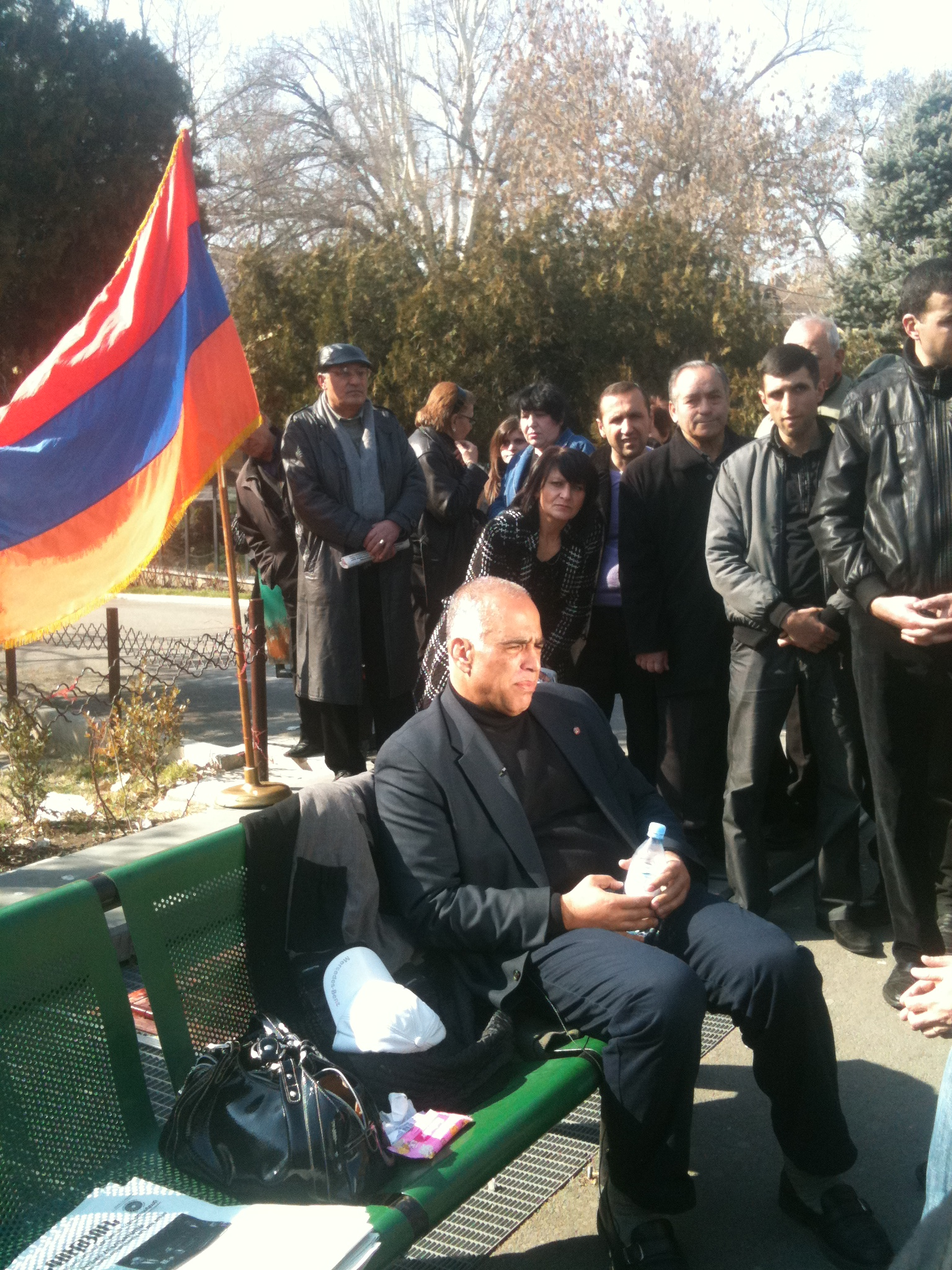
Raffi Hovannisian on hunger-strike near Freedom Square, 16 March

Armenian Minister of Parliament and Former Foreign Minister Raffi Hovannisian, a leader of Heritage, began a hunger strike in Freedom Square on 15 March to protest the government and advocate for snap elections.

==== 17 March ====
On 17 March, protesters continued to demand the resignations of the government, many members of which were elected in the disputed elections, in the evening at Freedom Square citing a will to replicate the Arab world protests. Ter-Petrosyan, again a featured speaker at the rally, said that the demonstrations were "peaceful" in intent. As many as 20,000 Armenians attended the rally, though the government said 9,000 attended and organizers claimed a turnout of 100,000. Hovannisian, now on the second day of his hunger strike, was present in Freedom Square with his supporters but was sidelined by Ter-Petrosyan and other Armenian National Congress leaders, straining relations between Heritage and the HAK.

Before the rally, opposition activist Samson Khachatrian was arrested after two plainclothes police officers alleged he assaulted them at the 1 March rally, a move one HAK leader called "a provocation". Khachatrian was later convicted of the assault, spurring mass outcry from the opposition.

==== 30 March ====
In a ceremony at Freedom Square, Hovannisian ended his public hunger strike by eating a hunk of bread symbolically blessed by an Armenian Orthodox priest. He said health concerns, including warnings from his doctor, as well as the arrival of his daughter's 18th birthday prompted him to call off the 15-day hunger strike, but he claimed the strike had affected "the public consciousness" even if it had not moved authorities to change their "consciousness and policies". Hovannisian also acknowledged cracks in the opposition to Sargsyan and the government, but he did not specifically acknowledge the simmering dispute between Heritage and the Armenian National Congress. A Republican Party of Armenia MP criticized the hunger strike, saying it was not the best means of enacting change.

==== 2–4 April ====
Several female intellectuals, including a Heritage MP, held a sit-in each day in Freedom Square starting on 2 April as a "logical continuation" of Hovannisian's protest action the month before. During the sit-in, attended by a handful of women each day, protesters sat silently for five hours before departing the square. Some critics within the opposition decried the sit-in as a gimmick, with one calling it a "waste of time".

==== 8 April ====
On 8 April, Ter-Petrosyan gave a 35-minute speech in Yerevan. The rally, organized by the Armenian National Congress, drew 12,000 attendees to Freedom Square in the city center in violation of an official ban. Despite the ban by the Yerevan city council, police ultimately stood aside in the face of the crowd and permitted the gathering. Ter-Petrosyan said that the Sargsyan administration must fulfill three demands by 28 April: promising an "objective inquiry" into post-election violence in 2008, giving the HAK the permanent legal right to demonstrate in Yerevan's Freedom Square, and securing the release of political prisoners. The former president also warned the opposition would "drastically change" its methods of resistance unless its demands were met.

At a press conference several days after the rally, Armenian National Congress official Levon Zurabian warned that the opposition saw the political situation as "a war, a real war". Zurabian added, "And if we want to achieve something in that war, we must and we will get ready for war." He suggested that mass striking, sit-ins, large-scale marches, and other acts of civil disobedience could be the next step for the opposition. Zurabian also claimed that, contrary to suggestions from leaders in allied parties that the opposition is ready to negotiate a deal that keeps the Sargsyan administration in power, the goal of the HAK remains forcing Sargsyan to resign and a snap election to be held.

==== 28 April ====
Two days before the planned rally in Freedom Square on 28 April, the municipality of Yerevan reversed its earlier decision not to grant permits to HAK to gather in the square. The mayor's office agreed to a planned route that included a demonstration in Freedom Square, issuing a permit for the first time in over two years for the gathering. The government also said the ban on demonstrations in the square would be lifted from 28 April forward.

Reuters reported a turnout of about 5,000 at the rally. Ter-Petrosyan referred to the government's announcement of concessions on access to Freedom Square and the investigation into the 2008 post-election violence and told the crowd, "If the door to dialogue is not yet open, it is half open." For the first time since protests began in January and February, he suggested that the grievances of demonstrators could be addressed through negotiation rather than regime change. Ter-Petrosyan also called on President Sargsyan to release jailed political dissidents and activists in time for the next planned rally on 31 May.

A significant number of protesters reportedly did not take part in a march through Yerevan following Ter-Petrosyan's speech, with some continuing to occupy the square afterward rather than leave, and the former president elicited some boos, whistles, and jeers when he expressed confidence that the government would release all political prisoners within weeks. Although HAK official Levon Zurabian said the party remains intent on forcing snap elections, Ter-Petrosyan did not mention the resignation of the government or new elections once throughout the speech.

==== 21 May ====
Raffi Hovannisian, the leader of Heritage, held an assembly in the Government Hall of Sessions in Yerevan reportedly attended by hundreds of citizens, including several fellow political figures and famous activists. Three panel discussions comprised the bulk of the town hall meeting, with topics of human rights, civics, and solutions to political differences featured respectively. Hovannisian set 4 June as the next date for an assembly, to be held in the more public setting of Freedom Square.

==== 31 May ====
Despite the general amnesty for jailed anti-government activists issued days before, the HAK held a major rally as scheduled in Freedom Square. The Armenian Police estimated a turnout of about 6,000, though the opposition disputed the figure and said it was much higher. HAK political leaders, including former Prime Minister Aram Sargsyan, former President Levon Ter-Petrosyan, and recently released ex-MP Sasun Mikaelyan, said the government was finally showing a willingness to engage with the opposition and meet its demands, as evidenced by the amnesty, and complimented protesters on their achievement in putting pressure on the government to fulfill the HAK's three preconditions for dialogue. However, Ter-Petrosyan, People's Party of Armenia head Stepan Demirchyan, and amnestied editor Nikol Pashinyan, among others, reiterated the HAK's calls for snap elections, criticizing the current government as the "result of rigged elections". Ter-Petrosyan also said that in the coming days, opposition leaders would be meeting with the government to present its proposal for a transition toward new elections, though he cautioned that the government would likely have different ideas and present its own agenda. Demirchyan took a less conciliatory tone, saying, "If the authorities fail to go for snap elections, we must force them." A Heritage MP also demanded the immediate release of her brother, who she said should have been freed under both recent changes to the Armenian criminal code and the recent amnesty, which purportedly covers him. The rally reportedly concluded with a march around downtown Yerevan, a promise by HAK officials that another rally would be held in June, and mass chants of "Levon for President!"

==== 30 June ====
At a rally police said was attended by 4,000 demonstrators, HAK supporters including Pashinyan, Zurabian, and Ter-Petrosyan criticised the Armenian government. Pashinyan called President Sargsian's statement on 22 June in which he said Azerbaijan was better prepared for a war over Nagorno-Karabakh than Armenia "one of the most disgraceful...in the diplomatic history of the Third Republic of Armenia," claiming it strengthened Azerbaijan's posture in the ongoing dispute. Zurabian warned that if the government did not engage with the HAK directly in "a short time," people would gather in the streets for mass protests. He said the government knew that "the only way to avoid a revolution or a social riot is agree to negotiations." Ter-Petrosyan said that unless the government agreed to the opposition's demands, including setting snap elections, by the next scheduled rally on 1 August, the HAK would return to the rhetoric of calling for Sargsian's immediate resignation. The tone of the rally suggested that the détente evident in the spirit of the previous two HAK mass gatherings had decidedly cooled.

==== 30 September ====
At a rally on 30 September, HAK decided to start a "non-stop rally", which was demanded by the protesters.

== Composition ==
The most prominent demonstrations in the pre–18 February period of the 2011 protests were held by street vendors. The Armenian National Congress sought to capitalize on the wave of rising dissent, fueled by successful uprisings against regimes in Tunisia and Egypt. As such, the HAK emerged as the leading voice in protests, with its leader Levon Ter-Petrosyan addressing all major rallies in Yerevan from 18 February onward. The HAK strongly encouraged merchants and others disillusioned with the government's policies to join them, and Ter-Petrosyan has aligned his party's goals with those of the street vendors who began the initial protests.

However, the HAK has not been the only voice of criticism against the government. Heritage, one of only two opposition parties with seats in the National Assembly, has also been active in galvanizing protest, though its demonstrations have been on a smaller scale and have largely come in the form of civil disobedience actions, such as hunger strikes and sit-ins, and public conferences. On 26 April, leader Raffi Hovannisian released a statement demanding that the government convene a constitutional convention, grant the International Criminal Court jurisdiction over Armenia, and officially recognize the Nagorno-Karabakh Republic. He said his supporters numbered in the "tens of thousands".

Another opposition group that emerged in late April, though it has not had any major role in organizing demonstrations, is the Armenian Revolutionary Federation (HHD), or Dashnaktsutyun, the other opposition party with a parliamentary presence. On 28 April, Dashnak leader Armen Rustamian criticized both Ter-Petrosyan and President Serzh Sargsyan, saying neither the HAK nor the Republican Party of Armenia (HHK) represent the interests of Armenians and that Ter-Petrosyan's role in fomenting dissent is self-serving. Rustamian has called for "radical" change, suggesting that any compromise between the HAK and the HHK will not "lead to a meaningful improvement of the existing situation". The Dashnaks have reportedly urged Sargsyan, whom their party supported as a coalition partner until 2009, to dismiss the government and hold snap elections. Both HHD and Heritage have adopted a hard line on Nagorno-Karabakh, jointly insisting in late June that the government not accept the terms laid out at a meeting in Kazan, Russia, and warning of massive street protests if Sargsian compromised on the breakaway republic's status.

== Role of social networking ==
The social networking website Facebook served as an early vehicle for organizing action against the government. Activists set up a new website called Revoforum, shorthand for "Revolutionary Forum", on 2 April as a discussion board for the political situation in Armenia. Complaints over high cost of living and inflation have reportedly driven historically apolitical but Internet-savvy young Armenians to organize online, and some have used sites like Facebook, Revoforum, and Twitter to get involved with street protests as well.

== Response ==
Police officials have accused opposition members of subverting peaceful protests, as in the case of the small 3 March protest that turned into a scuffle between protesters and law enforcement. A police statement claimed activists agitating for political reforms tried to "provoke fighting between citizens and the police" and defended the police response, which injured at least one protester.

One government MP said the protest ban on Freedom Square was for activists' sake, suggesting that violence could erupt if demonstrators were permitted to gather in the square. He also said President Sargsyan is not a dictator and is "not Gaddafi", a reference to Libyan leader Colonel Muammar al-Gaddafi, who has faced a sustained uprising against his rule since February. Another HHK official said the government would not make any concessions as long as the opposition continues to make demands.

On 31 March, in response to ongoing discontent from vendors petitioning for the re-legalization of street trading, the deputy mayor of Yerevan said of the crackdown, "These actions aimed at enforcing the law are resolute and final." He brushed aside the anger of protesters attending a parliamentary hearing on the matter, saying that the municipality already provides for trading in approved markets as a reasonable alternative to vending on the street.

On 12 April, the office of Yerevan Mayor Karen Karapetyan reaffirmed its protest ban on Freedom Square, a ban the opposition signaled it would continue to ignore. At a press conference, Karapetyan defended the ban, saying, "There are places in all countries of the world where no demonstrations are allowed to be held." The mayor said he did not view the ban as a violation of the opposition's freedom of speech.

President Sargsian expressed frustration in a 12 July interview over repeated questions as to the legitimacy of the elections that brought him and many of his parliamentary allies to power. He complained of a lack of civility in Armenian politics and said that just because Ter-Petrosyan and his backers did not congratulate him on his victory or formally concede the election, that did not mean the results were illegitimate. Sargsian has vowed that parliamentary elections scheduled for 2012 will be democratic in keeping with the standards of the Council of Europe.

=== Concessions ===
In April, the National Assembly finally passed a bill, which had been under debate for six months, expanding rights to free assembly. The new law gives people the legal right to gather peacefully, as demonstrators have done in Yerevan since January.

Armenian police chief Alik Sargsian said on 14 April that he would take a tougher approach to abuses and corruption in the ranks of the republic's law enforcement. "Let people understand that impunity is now unacceptable in the police," Alik Sargsian said. He did not specify whether he would focus on punishing police over alleged abuses of detainees and suspects.

On 19 April, Samson Khachatrian, the opposition activist convicted of assaulting police during the 1 March 2011 protest, was released after demands from opposition leaders that he be set free.

The Sargsyan administration vowed on 20 April to give greater priority to investigating allegations of violence against opposition supporters on 1 March 2008, a key demand of the protesters. "I expect new impetus and sharply intensified efforts to investigate the events," said Sargsyan at a conference open to press. Sargsyan also promised new reforms to make the Armenian justice system more effective and efficient. On 21 April, the government's chief investigator said, "The examination of the March 1 events will be reviewed entirely." He promised investigators would seek new evidence, review existing evidence, and reconsider its findings. Deputy Speaker Samvel Nikoyan, a parliamentary ally of Sargsyan, said he believed the concessions would prompt Ter-Petrosyan and other major critics in the opposition to consider that "language of ultimatum is not expedient while addressing the authorities". Nikoyan said he expects the opposition will join in "civilized dialogue" with the government as a result of the promised reexamination of the case. A HAK official agreed that one of the opposition's demands had been met, but said two other demands—presumably the release of political prisoners and access to Freedom Square, which Ter-Petrosyan also mentioned on 8 April—are outstanding and suggested he would not be fully satisfied by the promise of renewed investigation into the 1 March 2008 violence until the results were made public.

Karapetyan fulfilled another of Ter-Petrosyan's demands, at least in the short term, by granting a permit on 26 April for the planned 28 April HAK demonstration in Freedom Square. On 27 April, Sargsyan expressed hope for a peaceful dialogue between the government and the opposition going forward, with Freedom Square as a forum for "alternative ideas". He said his administration was willing to make the "first steps" in the hope of achieving compromise and "cooperation".

On 26 May, the National Assembly passed a wide-reaching amnesty plan for hundreds of prisoners, including six opposition activists detained since 2008, thus fulfilling the HAK's third and final precondition for dialogue with the government. Levon Zurabian said the opposition party will enter into negotiations with the Republican Party of Armenia for early elections to be held, as the HAK continues to dispute the legitimacy of the elections that brought Sargsyan and many government parliamentarians to power. Two jailed activists were released the next day, with more purportedly to follow.

The government offered another major concession on 9 July, with a spokesman for Sargsian saying the HHK and its two junior coalition partners, Prosperous Armenia (BHK) and Rule of Law (OEK), had agreed to form an ad hoc group to hold negotiations with the HAK. Several senior party officials and lawmakers were appointed to this group, which is intended to meet with a similar HAK delegation to discuss a solution to the standoff over Armenia's governance.

In December, Caucasus Institute director Alexander Iskandaryan named the dialogue between the opposition and the government prompted by the protests as one of the most significant developments of 2011, saying it "altered the political reality in Armenia".

== See also ==
- 2012 Armenian parliamentary election protests
- 1996 Armenian presidential election protests
- 2008 Armenian presidential election protests
