= Green Party of Armenia =

Political party in Armenia

Green Party of Armenia Հայաստանի Կանաչների կուսակցություն
- Abbreviation: GPA
- Leader: Armenak Dovlatyan
- Founded: February 1999
- Headquarters: Yerevan
- Ideology: Green politics Environmentalism; Green economics
- Political position: Left-wing
- National affiliation: Free Homeland Alliance (2021)

The Green Party of Armenia (Armenian: Հայաստանի Կանաչների կուսակցություն, romanized: Hayastani Kanach’neri kusakts’ut’yun), also known as the Social-Ecological Party, is a Green political party in Armenia.

== History ==
The party was established in February 1999 by Armenak Dovlatyan, a former member of the Armenian National Congress party. The party currently does not have any political representation in the National Assembly and acts as an extra-parliamentary force.

== Ideology ==
The party is Armenia's main green political force and actively campaigns for greater environmental protection throughout the country. However, party leader Dovaltyan, confirmed that environmentalism is not the only issue important to the party. The party encourages economic development, reducing levels of outward emigration, and supports greater unity between Armenia and the Armenian Diaspora. During the 2020 Nagorno-Karabakh war, Dovaltyan called for an end to foreign interference in Armenia and to increase Armenian support to the Republic of Artsakh.

== Electoral record ==
The party did not directly participate in the 2012 Armenian parliamentary election, however the party was represented through its political association with the Armenian National Congress party, who gained 7 seats in the National Assembly.

Prior to the 2013 Armenian presidential election, the party announced it would not participate due to concerns over corruption and electoral fraud. The party endorsed Hrant Bagratyan, leader of the Freedom Party.

The party boycotted the 2017 Armenian parliamentary election.

The party did participate in the 2018 Yerevan City Council election as part of the "Yerevan Society Alliance", with the Alliance of Ideological Liberals. The alliance finished 9th place, taking less than 1% of the popular vote. As such, the party failed to gain any seats in the Yerevan City Council.

Prior to the 2018 Armenian parliamentary election, the party announced it would participate in the elections and that it would be open to discussing options to form political alliance's with other parties. Ultimately however, the party failed to register and did not participate. Following the election, Dovaltyan stated that he was generally pleased with newly elected Prime Minister Nikol Pashinyan and hoped that the spirit of the 2018 Armenian velvet revolution would continue.

The Green Party confirmed that it would participate in the 2021 Armenian parliamentary elections as part of the Free Homeland Alliance. Following the election, the Free Homeland Alliance received just 0.32% of the popular vote, failing to win any seats in the National Assembly.

== Activities ==
In 2011, the Green Party of Armenia participated in the European Green Party Conference held in Paris.

In October 2011, party members voiced strong opposition to the construction of a Hydro electric dam at the Trchkan waterfall in northern Armenia. Party members were concerned that the 25-metre waterfall and the surrounding forests would be at risk if the new dam was built at the confluence of two rivers between the Shirak and Lori regions. Due to public pressure, Prime Minister Tigran Sargsyan declared that work on the dam was to stop and that the Trchkan waterfall would be granted protected status.

In March 2012, the party called on the Government of Armenia to increase the amount of protected green spaces in the country, including in the capital, Yerevan. Also in 2012, the party released a statement calling for reforestation efforts to be increased and to limit the spread of urban sprawl.

In November 2015, the Green Party of Armenia participated in a Global Greens initiative, in which the party signed a joint statement along with 40 other Green parties across the world, pledging to reduce greenhouse gas emissions.

In December 2020, Armenak Dovlatyan met with the President of Armenia, Armen Sargsyan to discuss the political situation in the country.

== See also ==
- Politics of Armenia
- Programs of political parties in Armenia
