= Armenian Liberal Party =

- Leader: Hovhannes Hovhannisyan
- Founded: 2008
- Headquarters: Yerevan
- Ideology: Liberalism; Economic liberalism
- Political position: Centre

Armenian Liberal Party (Armenian: Հայաստանի լիբերալ կուսակցություն; Hayastani liberal kusakcut'yun) is a liberal political party in Armenia. The leader of the party is Hovhannes Hovhannisyan.

== History ==
The party was founded in 2008. The Pan-Armenian National Movement and the Freedom Party congratulated the party on its foundation.

The party was a member of the Armenian National Congress between 2008 and 2012.

In 2014, Hovhannes Hovhannisyan announced that the Armenian Liberal Party signed a cooperation agreement with the Prosperous Armenia party.

The party did not participate in the 2018 Armenian parliamentary election.

== Ideology ==
The party believes in strengthening human rights, fundamental freedoms, and creating a free market and competitive economic system in Armenia. During an interview, Hovhannisyan stated "Liberal values are the basis of human and state well-being."

== See also ==
- Programs of political parties in Armenia
- Politics of Armenia
