= Hayazn =

- Founder: Sergey Dalakyan, Sargis Chilincaryan, Hamlet Khamoyan, Heghine Sargsyan, Ani Sargsyan
- Founded: 2009 (as an NGO); 2013/2014 (as a political party)
- Headquarters: Yerevan
- Ideology: Armenian nationalism National Revolutionary (self-described); Euroscepticism; Anti-EAEU

Hayazn (Armenian: Հայազն) is an Armenian nationalist political party, that was founded as a civil organization in 2009. It declared itself a political party in 2013 and was registered as such in 2014.

== Ideology ==
Hayazn has stated its opposition to Armenia's possible integration into the European Union or to the Eurasian Customs Union (which included at the time a customs union of Belarus, Kazakhstan and Russia). Hayazn has also called on the Government of Armenia to opt out of the European Neighbourhood Policy in the past.

Hayazn opposes any official recognition by Armenia of the Artsakh Republic. Instead, Hayazn supports the unification of the Artsakh Republic as an integral part of Armenia, turning Artsakh into an additional Armenian province within the borders of an expanded Armenian Republic.

In internal affairs, Hayazn was opposed to Serzh Sargsyan's government and has condemned its internal and foreign policies, in particular the way it handled the Nagorno-Karabakh conflict within the OSCE Minsk Group. The party called for a "no" vote in the 2015 constitutional referendum.

== Activities ==
Although Hayazn was not registered as a political party, and couldn't legally participate in the 2012 parliamentary election, the party nonetheless refused to participate. It blamed mainstream opposition parties (Armenian Revolutionary Federation, Armenian National Congress, Heritage) for not being "pro-people", and the government for electoral fraud which resulted in the formation of, what they call, an illegitimate government.

In June 2011, the party started to collect signatures for granting citizenship of Jirair Sefilian, a Lebanese-born Armenian military commander of the First Nagorno-Karabakh War. More than 4,000 signatures were gathered. However, the relationship with Sefilian deteriorated, when on 2 September 2013 Hayazn members reportedly attacked and beat-up Varuszhan Avetisyan, the press secretary and member of the Pre-Parliament.

On 1 September 2012, Hayazn organized a protest during which several of its members burnt the Hungarian flag as an act of protest against Ramil Safarov's release to Azerbaijan. They also demanded the resignation of the Foreign Minister Eduard Nalbandyan.

On 21 May 2012, Hayazn organized a parallel march in opposition to a "Diversity march" organized by the LGBT community of Armenia. The march was stopped prematurely, because LGBT activists were afraid of their safety. On 10 October 2012, Hayazn organized a protest in front of Germany's embassy in Yerevan protesting against the presentation of the film The Parade about gay activism in Serbia. The party stated that they would not tolerate "propaganda of immorality". During anti-Putin protests on 2 December 2013, several members of Hayazn attacked LGBT rights activist and demanded that they do not fly the Rainbow flag during the protests.

Throughout spring 2013, Hayazn was a vocal opponent of leasing land in the Syunik Province to Iranian pastures.

Hayazn took an active role in the 2013 anti-government protests. On 2 December 2013, along with several other political parties, they took to the streets to protest Russia's president Vladimir Putin's visit to Armenia and Serzh Sargsyan's decision to join the Customs Union of Belarus, Kazakhstan, and Russia.

The party did not participate in the 2018 Armenian parliamentary election.

== See also ==
- National Revival (Artsakh) - Nationalist party in Artsakh.
- Programs of political parties in Armenia
