= Vardan Sedrakyan =

Armenian epic poetry expert

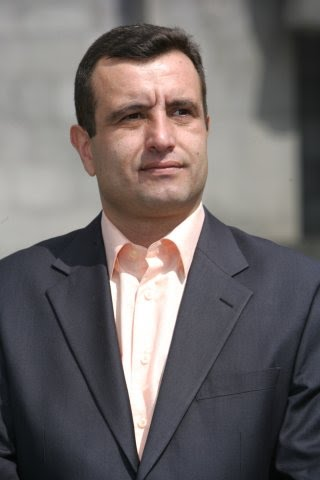
Vardan Sedrakyan

Vardan Zhorzhiki Sedrakyan (Armenian: Վարդան Ժորժիկի Սեդրակյան) is an Armenian epic poetry expert. Since 1998, he has provided analysis of epic tales of nations all over the world. His main results have been periodically published in press and by television. He was one of the seven candidates in the 2013 Armenian presidential elections, where he received roughly 0.42% of the vote. After the elections, he was arrested and sentenced to 14 years imprisonment for organizing the attempted murder of another presidential candidate, Paruyr Hayrikyan. Sedrakyan was released on probation in May 2021.

== Biography ==
Sedrakyan was born on August 20, 1967, in Yerevan, Armenia.
