= Levon Zourabian =

Armenian politician

- Լևոն Զուրաբյան
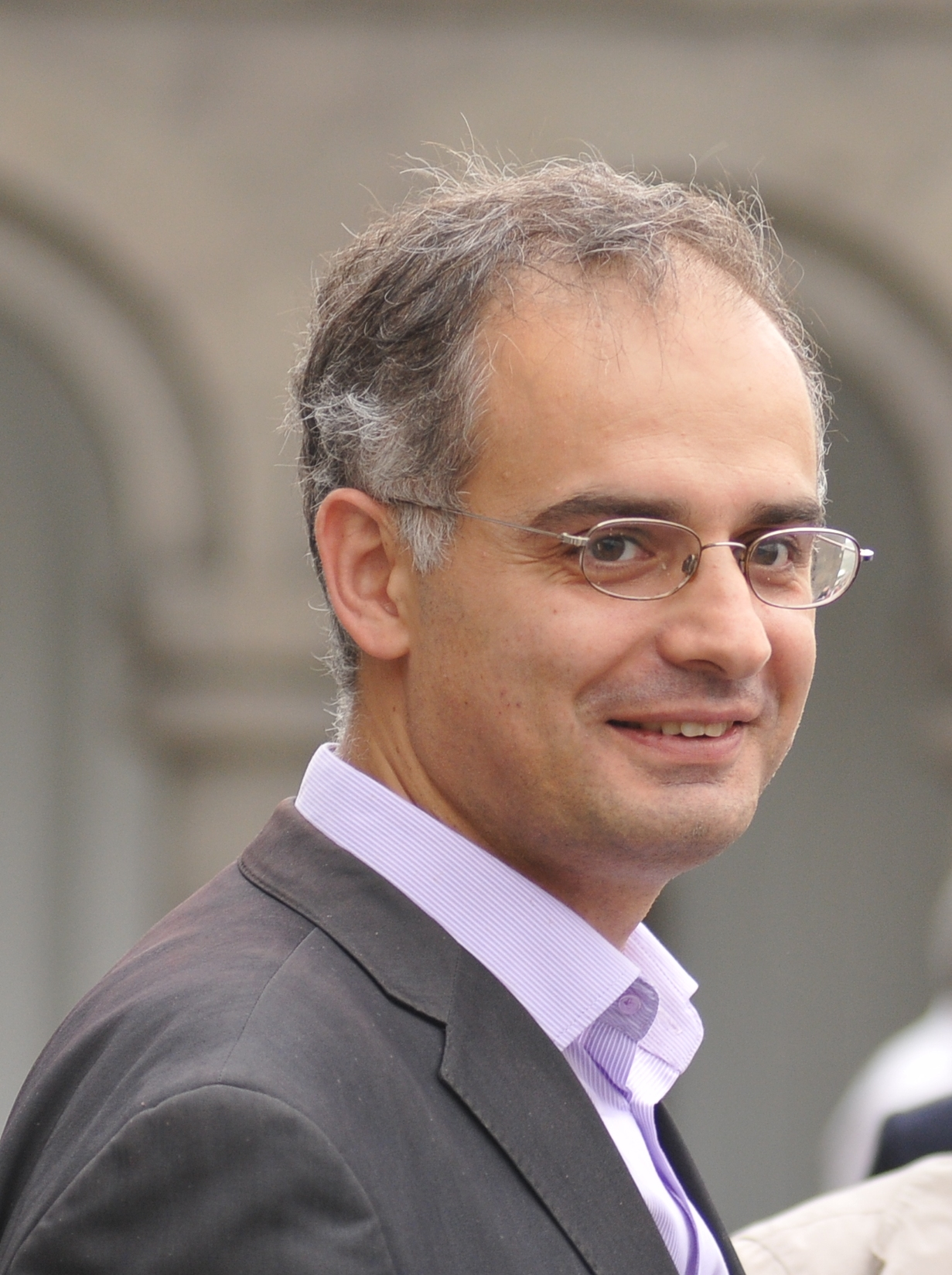
- Zourabian in 2009

Vice-chairman of the Armenian National Congress
- Incumbent
- Assumed office April 13, 2013

Personal details
- Born: March 9, 1964 (age 62) Yerevan, Armenia
- Spouse: Shogher Matevosyan

Levon Arami Zourabian (Armenian: Լևոն Արամի Զուրաբյան; born March 9, 1964) is an Armenian politician and vice-chairman of the Armenian National Congress political party. He was a member of parliament and the head of the Armenian National Congress's parliamentary faction from 2012 to 2017. In December 2025, the Armenian National Congress announced Zourabian as its candidate for prime minister for the 2026 parliamentary elections.

== Early life and career ==
Levon Zourabyan was born in Yerevan, Armenia to a family of prominent intellectuals. He is the son of professor Aram Zourabian and screenwriter Agnesa Sevunts, and the grandson of writer Garegin Sevunts and poet Shoghik Safyan. In 1985 he graduated from the theoretical physics department of Yerevan State University. In 1989–1991 he worked at Yerevan Physics Institute as a researcher. He conducted research and published articles on quantum field theory, supersymmetry and supergravitation, and superstring field theory. He became actively involved in the Karabakh movement in 1988. In 1991 he was appointed an aide to the first president of Armenia Levon Ter-Petrossian, and in 1994 he was appointed the head of the president’s press office. Zourabian resigned in 1998 following the resignation of Ter-Petrossian.

In 1998 Zourabian was awarded an Edmund S. Muskie Graduate Fellowship which allowed him to enroll at the School of International and Public Affairs at Columbia University. He graduated from Columbia with a master's degree in International Relations. After his return to Armenia he worked as Team Leader for IBM Business Consulting/PricewaterhouseCoopers’ Armenia office in 2001–2004. From 2005 to 2007 he worked as an analyst in the International Crisis Group. In that capacity he contributed to reports on the conflicts in Nagorno-Karabakh and South Ossetia, as well as the report on the conditions of Armenian and Azerbaijani minorities in Georgia.

== Armenian National Congress ==
Following the return of Levon Ter-Petrossian to active politics in 2007, Zourabian resigned from the International Crisis Group and continued his career as a public figure supporting Ter-Petrossian’s candidacy during the presidential elections of 2008. After the formation of the Armenian National Congress in 2008 he became Coordinator of its Central Office.

During the 2012 Armenian parliamentary election, Zourabian was elected to the National Assembly of Armenia as a majoritarian candidate for the 9th electoral district. He led the Armenian National Congress's faction in parliament. After serving as an MP and leading the ANC’s parliamentary faction until 2017, Zourabian continued his political activity within the Armenian National Congress leadership as deputy chairman. In the 2021 parliamentary election, the ANC received 1.5% of the vote and failed to enter parliament.

In December 2025, the ANC announced it would participate in Armenia’s 2026 parliamentary elections and nominated Zourabian as its candidate for Prime Minister, stating that it intended to pursue a broad political alliance format for the campaign. At the announcement press conference, Zourabian emphasized Armenia’s security challenges as a top priority, followed by private-sector economic development.

== Personal life ==
Levon Zourabian is married to Shogher Matevosyan, who is the editor in chief of Chorrord Ishkhanutyun weekly and the daughter of writer Hrant Matevosyan. They have two children.
