= Freedom Party (Armenia) =

Freedom Party Ազատություն կուսակցություն
- Leader: Hrant Bagratyan
- Founded: 1997
- Headquarters: Yerevan
- Ideology: Liberalism

Freedom Party (Armenian: Ազատություն կուսակցություն, romanized: Azatut’yun kusakts’ut’yun) is an Armenian political party. It was founded on 29 May 1997 and is currently led by former Prime Minister of Armenia Hrant Bagratyan.

== History ==
The Freedom Party was founded in May 1997 by Hrant Bagratyan, who served as Prime Minister of Armenia between 1993 and 1996. Bagratyan was a member of the Armenian National Congress.

The party participated in the 1999 Armenian parliamentary election, winning 1.02% of the vote.

The party participated in the 2012 Armenian parliamentary election under the Armenian National Congress bloc and Bagratyan was elected as the only MP from his party.

On 24 December 2012, Hrant Bagratyan was nominated to participate in the 2013 Armenian presidential election during a party congress held in Yerevan. Following the presidential election, Bagratyan came in third place, winning 2.15% of the vote.

Prior to the 2017 Armenian parliamentary election, the party announced its intentions to participate in the elections under the Free Democrats party. The joint list was headed by the leader of the Free Democrats party, Khachatur Kokobelyan, while the candidate for the post of Prime Minister was Hrant Bagratyan. Following the election, the Free Democrats won 0.94% of the vote, failing to win any seats.

The party announced its intentions to participate in the 2021 Armenian parliamentary elections independently. Following the election, the party won just 0.14% of the popular vote, failing to win any seats in the National Assembly. Currently, the party acts as an extra-parliamentary force.

== Ideology ==
The party describes its principle ideology as modern liberalism and is in favour of a free-market economy. The party supports independence for Artsakh, increasing the military budget, and improving Armenia's security issues. The party also believes in maintaining strong ties with Russia, while developing closer ties with Iran and China.

== Electoral record ==
=== Parliamentary elections ===
Election	Leader	Votes	%	Seats	+/–	Position	Government
2021	Hrant Bagratyan	1,844	0.14	0 / 107	0	▲21st	Extra-parliamentary

== See also ==
- Programs of political parties in Armenia
