= Levon Ter-Petrosyan =

President of Armenia from 1991 to 1998

- Լևոն Տեր-Պետրոսյան
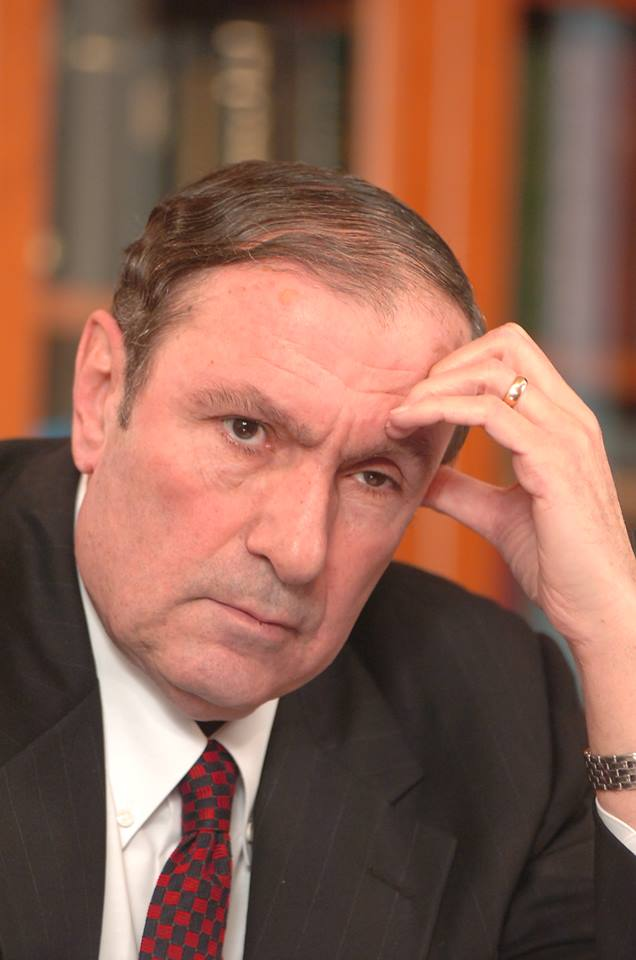
- Ter-Petrosyan in 2014

1st President of Armenia
- In office 11 November 1991 – 3 February 1998
- Prime Minister: Vazgen Manukyan; Gagik Harutyunyan; Khosrov Harutyunyan; Hrant Bagratyan; Armen Sarkissian; Robert Kocharyan; Armen Darbinyan
- Vice President: Gagik Harutyunyan
- Preceded by: Position established (himself as Chairman of the Supreme Council of Armenia)
- Succeeded by: Robert Kocharyan

Chairman of the Supreme Council of Armenia
- In office 4 August 1990 – 11 November 1991
- Preceded by: Samson Tonoyan (as Chairman of the Supreme Soviet of the Armenian SSR)
- Succeeded by: Babken Ararktsyan

Leader of Armenian National Congress
- Incumbent
- Assumed office 1 August 2008
- Preceded by: Position established

Personal details
- Born: Levon Hakobi Ter-Petrosyan; 9 January 1945 (age 81) Aleppo, Syria
- Party: Armenian National Congress (since 2008)
- Other political affiliations: Pan-Armenian National Movement (1989–2008); Pan-Armenian National Movement (2008–2013)
- Spouse: Lyudmila Pleskovskaya (m. 1972)
- Children: 1
- Education: Yerevan State University; Leningrad State University
- Website: anc.am

Levon Hakobi Ter-Petrosyan (Note: Also transcribed as Ter-Petrossian and Ter-Petrosian and Levon Hagopi Der Bedrossian in Western Armenian: Լեւոն Յակոբի Տէր Պետրոսեան.) (Armenian: Լևոն Հակոբի Տեր-Պետրոսյան; born 9 January 1945), also known by his initials LTP, is an Armenian politician and historian who served as the first president of Armenia from 1991 until his resignation in 1998.

A senior researcher at the Matenadaran institute, he rose to prominence as a leading figure of the Karabakh movement for the unification of the Armenian-populated Nagorno-Karabakh with Armenia, which began in 1988. After Armenia declared independence from the Soviet Union in September 1991, Ter-Petrosyan was elected by a landslide as the country's first president in the 1991 Armenian presidential election, receiving an overwhelming public support. In his role as a head of state, he led the country through the First Nagorno-Karabakh War with neighboring Azerbaijan.

He was reelected in the 1996 presidential election, which was marred by accusations of electoral fraud, sparking mass protests led by runner-up Vazgen Manukyan. The mass rallies were suppressed by military force. Due to disagreements with key members of his government over a peace proposal for the Nagorno-Karabakh conflict, especially Defence Minister Vazgen Sargsyan and Prime Minister Robert Kocharyan, Ter-Petrosyan resigned on 3 February 1998.

From his resignation up until 2007, Ter-Petrosyan was inactive in the political scene. However, he made a political comeback in September 2007 and ran for president in 2008. He faced one of his former government members, then-Prime Minister Serzh Sargsyan. According to official results, he earned 21.5% of the total vote. Ter-Petrosyan claimed the elections were rigged and led thousands of his supporters in mass protests against the alleged electoral fraud and called for new elections. After a week of mass protests, the government used police and military force to disperse his supporters, resulting in the deaths of ten people on 1 March 2008.

On 1 August 2008, Ter-Petrosyan founded the Armenian National Congress (ANC), with more than a dozen political parties and non-governmental organizations joining forces. Being the main opposition party in Armenia at the time, the ANC was out of the parliament and was primarily involved in street protests against Serzh Sargsyan's government. They organized mass rallies in 2011, forcing the government to grant several political concessions. In parliamentary elections in 2012, the ANC received 7.1% of the popular vote, gaining 7 seats. Ter-Petrosyan's party lost those seats in the following elections and has not entered parliament since. He led the ANC's electoral list during snap parliamentary elections in June 2021, where the party again failed to enter parliament.

== Early life and education ==
Ter-Petrosyan was born on 9 January 1945 in Aleppo, Syria, to an Armenian family descended from a long line of priests living near Musa Dagh in the Hatay region, now located in southern Turkey. His family took part in the armed resistance at Musa Dagh during the Armenian genocide before fleeing to Syria. His father, Hakob Ter-Petrosyan, was first a member of the Hunchakian Party and later a founding member of the Syrian Communist Party.

He had three brothers, Telman (1936–1997), Petros (1938–2013), and Kamo (born 1948), as well as a younger sister, Iskuhi (1953–2015). His family emigrated to Soviet Armenia in 1947, when he was still an infant, just before the birth of his only living younger brother, Kamo, and one grandchild, Nerses Ter-Petrosyan.

In 1969, he graduated from the Oriental Studies Department of Yerevan State University. In 1972, he completed his postgraduate studies at Leningrad State University. In 1987, he received his doctoral degree from the same university. From 1972 to 1979, Ter-Petrosyan worked as junior researcher at the Manuk Abeghyan Literature Institute of the Armenian Academy of Sciences. From 1979 to 1984, he held the position of science secretary at Matenadaran, a research institution named after Saint Mesrop Mashtots.

Since 1984, he has worked at Matenadaran as a senior researcher.

== Academic career ==
Ter-Petrosyan wrote his doctoral dissertation on the Assyrian language and its ties to Armenian. In addition, he is the author of more than 30 books, about 80 scientific articles in Armenian, French, and Russian, as well as thousands of political publications in the multilingual press (speeches, articles, interviews, press conferences, etc.). He is a member of the Writers Union of Armenia, the French Asian Society, the Venice Academy of Mekhitarist, and a recipient of honorary doctorates from the University of La Verne, the University of Sofia, Paris-Sorbonne University, and the University of Strasbourg.

== Karabakh movement and the independence of Armenia ==
In late 1987 and early 1988, the Karabakh movement emerged in Soviet Armenia and the Armenian-majority Nagorno-Karabakh Autonomous Oblast with the goal of transferring the autonomous region from Azerbaijan to Armenia. On 19 May 1988, Levon Ter-Petrosyan, Vazgen Manukyan, and 9 others founded a new Karabakh Committee, which soon took leadership of the Karabakh movement from the older committee led by Zori Balayan and Igor Muradyan. Levon Ter-Petrosyan was the de facto leader of the committee. Under the leadership of Ter-Petrosyan and Manukyan, the Karabakh movement transformed from being purely concerned with the unification of Nagorno-Karabakh with Armenia into a broader movement for democratization.

From 10 December 1988 to 31 May 1989, Ter-Petrosyan was imprisoned in Moscow's Matrosskaya Tishina prison, alongside other members of the Karabakh Committee. After their release, they returned to Yerevan and continued their activities. In 1989, Ter-Petrosyan and the other members of the Karabakh Committee founded a political party called the Pan-Armenian National Movement (ANM, also known by its Armenian acronym HHSh). Later on, Ter-Petrosyan became the party's chairman. On 27 August 1989, he was elected as a deputy of the Supreme Soviet of the Armenian SSR, and reelected on 20 May 1990. In elections in May 1990, the Pan-Armenian National Movement won a majority of seats in the Supreme Soviet of Armenia, becoming the first non-communist party to take power in a Soviet republic. On 4 August of the same year, Ter-Petrosyan was elected Chairman of the Supreme Council of Armenia, becoming the de facto leader of Armenia.

As clashes between newly formed Armenian militias and Soviet forces intensified in mid-1990, Ter-Petrosyan was pressured by Soviet leader Mikhail Gorbachev to disarm the militias. Ter-Petrosyan complied, but the militias continued their activities in Nagorno-Karabakh. On 23 August 1990, Armenia formally declared its intention to become an independent state with Nagorno-Karabakh as an integral part. On 12 September 1990, Ter-Petrosyan met with Gorbachev, Azerbaijani leader Ayaz Mutalibov, and other Soviet officials. At the meeting, Gorbachev accepted Ter-Petrosyan's demands to withdraw the Soviet Army from Armenian settlements and create a line of demarcation between Armenians and Azeris in Nagorno-Karabakh. Although Ter-Petrosyan initially expressed his willingness to include Armenia in a new union of sovereign states to replace the USSR, he found Mikhail Gorbachev's proposal for a new union treaty unacceptable. Armenia was one of six Soviet republics that refused to participate in the March 1991 referendum on the New Union Treaty.

As Armenia moved toward independence, further clashes occurred both within Armenia and on the border with Azerbaijan in May 1991, and Soviet troops undertook an operation to deport Armenian villagers from parts of Azerbaijan. Ter-Petrosyan publicly stated on 6 May 1991 that "To all intents and purposes, the Soviet Union has declared war on Armenia." Ter-Petrosyan opposed the coup attempt against Gorbachev in August 1991. He attended unsuccessful negotiations with Ayaz Mutalibov mediated by Boris Yeltsin and Nursultan Nazarbayev in late September. On 20 September 1991, Armenians voted overwhelmingly in favor of independence, and the country officially declared independence three days later.

== Presidency: 1991–1998 ==
=== First term ===
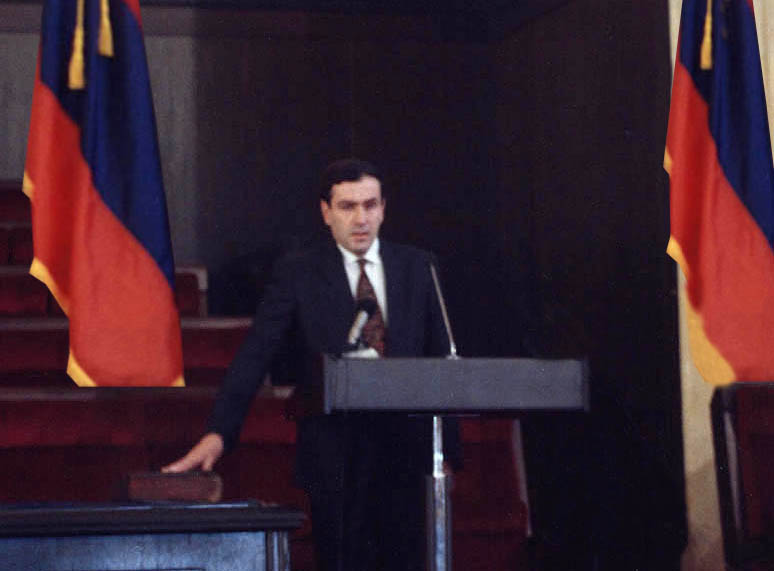
Inauguration of Ter-Petrosyan as president in 1991.

Ter-Petrosyan was elected the first President of the newly independent Armenia on 16 October 1991, receiving 83% of the vote. On 18 October 1991, he signed onto Gorbachev's failed attempt to form an economic community out of the collapsing Soviet Union and preserve the economic ties between the republics (only 8 of the 15 republics agreed to sign). Ter-Petrosyan then brought Armenia into the Commonwealth of Independent States, which formed after the formal abolition of the Soviet Union in December 1991. Ter-Petrosyan appointed Vazgen Sargsyan the first Defense Minister of independent Armenia in December 1991. On 28 January 1992, the Armenian government passed the historical decree "On the Ministry of Defense of the Republic of Armenia", which formally created the Armed Forces of Armenia. In late 1991 and early 1992, the fighting in Nagorno-Karabakh expanded into a full-scale war. With the rise of hostilities in Nagorno-Karabakh, in March 1992, Sargsyan announced that Armenia needed a 30,000-strong army to maintain security. Under Ter-Petrosyan's leadership as the commander-in-chief on 9 May 1992, the Armenian forces recorded their first major military success in Nagorno-Karabakh with the capture of Shusha. Another significant victory for the Armenian forces was recorded weeks later with the capture of Lachin, which connects Armenia proper with Nagorno-Karabakh. In the summer of 1992, following the launch of Operation Goranboy, the Armenian forces had major losses. Ter-Petrosyan dismissed Defense Minister Vazgen Sargsyan, as between October 1992 and March 1993, Sargsyan served as the Presidential Adviser on Defence Affairs and the Presidential Envoy to Border Regions of Armenia, Ter-Petrosyan appointed his comrade-turned-rival Vazgen Manukyan to the post. According to Vazgen Manukyan, on several occasions, the more cautious Ter-Petrosyan was, he deliberately not fully informed about the extent of the Armenian military's participation in operations in Nagorno-Karabakh. In early April 1993, the Armenian forces captured Kelbajar, a city outside the originally contested areas, causing international attention to the conflict. Turkey closed its border with Armenia, while the United Nations passed a resolution condemning the act. Vazgen Manukyan was dismissed from his post in August 1993. In the summer of 1993, Armenian forces gained more territories and, by August, controlled Fizuli, Jebrail, and Zangelan. It was estimated that during Ter-Petrosian's presidency, the fact that a significant share of the country's GDP was spent on defense contributed significantly to the outcome of the war and the formation of the army. By early 1994, both countries were devastated by the war. On 5 May, the Bishkek Protocol was signed by the heads of the parliaments of Nagorno-Karabakh, Armenia, and Azerbaijan. The Nagorno-Karabakh Republic, backed by Armenia, established de facto control of these lands. The war ended in an Armenian victory with the signing of a ceasefire agreement in May 1994 by representatives of Armenia, Azerbaijan, and the Nagorno-Karabakh Republic.

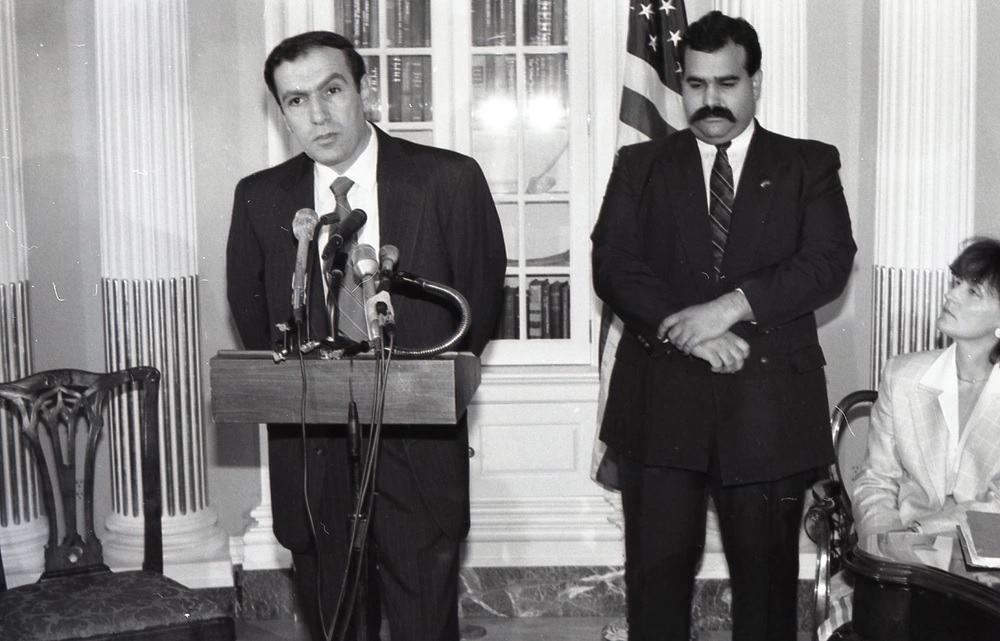
Ter-Petrosyan with foreign minister Raffi Hovannisian in Washington, D.C.

Despite Ter-Petrosyan's efforts to establish normal relations with Turkey, which included arranging for the transport of wheat to Armenia from the EU through Turkish territory and attending the funeral of Turkish president Turgut Özal in Ankara, the capture of Kalbajar district by Armenian forces in April 1993 significantly worsened relations with Turkey. That month Turkey closed its border with Armenia. As on other occasions, Vazgen Manukyan. deliberately presented only a small part of the Kalbajar operation to Ter-Petrosyan. The Armenian-Turkish border remains closed to this day and the two countries have no diplomatic relations.

After the dissolution of the Soviet Union took place as a result and against the backdrop of general economic stagnation, even regression. As the Gosplan, which had set up production chains to cross SSR lines, broke down, the inter-republic economic connections were also disrupted, leading to an even more serious breakdown of the post-Soviet economies. Armenia suffered severe economic hardship in the first years following independence, It is difficult to overstate the calamity that faced Armenia in 1991–93. The country, land-locked and with few natural resources, was beginning the transition from a centrally-planned to a market economy, with very limited institutional capacity. As a result of the conflict raging with Azerbaijan over Nagorno Karabakh (NK), an ethnic Armenian enclave inside Azerbaijan, refugees from Azerbaijan were streaming into Armenia. At the same time, Azerbaijan imposed a trade embargo, shutting off most supplies of energy and other critical goods (the main natural gas pipelines which supplied Armenia through Azerbaijan were closed) due to the full-scale war. The border with Turkey, which was sympathetic to Azerbaijan, was closed, and the main routes into the country to the north through Georgia were subject to frequent interdiction and the route through Georgia was frequently closed due to civil unrest there. As Armenia was deeply integrated with the Soviet economy and had the highest level of imports of any Soviet republic. Armenia's GDP declined drastically from 1991 to 1993 because of these factors, and fuel shortages were ubiquitous. The worst years of the energy crisis have been dubbed the "dark and cold years" in Armenia, alleviated after the restarting of Metsamor Nuclear Power Plant in October 1995. In 1992, Ter-Petrosyan's prime minister Hrant Bagratyan adopted an economic reform program to rapidly marketize the Armenian economy. After the dissolution of the Soviet Union from 1991 to 1993, Armenia's income decline of 63 percent was greater than that of any Former Soviet Union country except Georgia. The average decline for the Commonwealth Independent States (CIS, excluding the Baltics) was 51 percent. The reform adopted by Hrant Bagratyan also made a good start on developing the basic legal framework necessary for a market economy. The Property Law enacted in October 1991, provided a legal basis for companies and a basic commercial code. All legal restrictions on private entry and competition in wholesale trade were removed. And the Enterprise Privatization Law (July 1992) provided that a privatization program be developed every year to sell remaining state-owned firms, including large firms. He was qualified as Leader of the Armenian economic reforms end of the 20th century, defined by the World Bank as one of the best among former Soviet Union republics and countries of Eastern Europe. Armenia's economic hardships during Ter-Petrosyan's presidency made him deeply unpopular among much of the population, and some 693,999.00 people emigrated, nevertheless, it was estimated that the emigration numbers continued to grow after his resignation.

Ter-Petrosyan's first term also saw significant tension between his government and the Armenian Revolutionary Federation (ARF), a nationalist political party which holds enormous influence in the Armenian diaspora and had established itself as Ter-Petrosyan's main opposition. On 29 June 1992, Ter-Petrosyan delivered a televised address where he accused the ARF of collaboration with the KGB and pilfering funds raised from the diaspora intended for Armenia and Nagorno-Karabakh. Two years later, on 28 December 1994, Ter-Petrosyan declared that a plot by the ARF to violently overthrow the government had been uncovered. The party was banned from the Republic of Armenia and its offices were raided by police. Thirty-one ARF members, who would later be known as the "Dro Group", an alleged secret wing of the ARF, were arrested and charged with conspiracy to overthrow the government, committing several assassinations, and drug trafficking; all were found guilty. The ban on the ARF was lifted by Ter-Petrosyan's successor Robert Kocharyan soon after Ter-Petrosyan's resignation.

=== 1996 reelection ===
Although Ter-Petrosyan was initially expected to win the 1996 presidential election by a large margin due to the opposition being divided, three other candidates dropped out of the race and endorsed Vazgen Manukyan. According to the official results, Ter-Petrosyan received about 52%, just above the 50% required to win without a runoff election. His reelection was marred by allegations of electoral fraud reported by the opposition and supported by many international observers. On 25 September 1996, around 200,000 people in Yerevan came out to protest the election results, then stormed the parliament building and beat the speaker and deputy speaker of parliament following a speech by Vazgen Manukyan. Tanks and troops were brought into Yerevan to end the protests. On the same day, Defence Minister Vazgen Sargsyan stated that "even if they [the opposition] win 100 percent of the votes, neither the Army nor the National Security and Interior Ministry would recognize such political leaders." Later in January 1999, Ter-Petrosyan's interior minister at the time of the election Vano Siradeghyan admitted that the government had resorted to vote-rigging to secure Ter-Petrosyan's victory without a runoff election and stated that after the crackdown, Ter-Petrosyan fell into a three-month depression. According to Siradeghyan, "the whole state apparatus was demoralized, paralyzed and no government was formed during [the ensuing] three months." Ter-Petrosyan's popularity waned further as the opposition started blaming him for the economic quagmire that Armenia's post-Soviet economy was in.

=== Resignation ===
Ter-Petrosyan was forced to step down in February 1998 after advocating a compromised settlement of the conflict over Nagorno-Karabakh which many Armenians regarded as undermining their security. Ter-Petrosyan's key ministers, namely then-Prime Minister Robert Kocharyan, Defense Minister Vazgen Sargsyan and Interior Minister Serzh Sargsyan, refused to accept a peace plan for Karabakh put forward by international mediators in September 1997. The leadership of the Nagorno-Karabakh Republic were also opposed to the plan. The plan, accepted by Ter-Petrosyan and Azerbaijan's leader Heydar Aliyev, called for a "phased" settlement of the conflict which would postpone an agreement on Karabakh's status, the main stumbling block. The "phased" approach envisioned the return of most of the Armenian-occupied Azerbaijani territories around Nagorno-Karabakh in exchange for the deployment of OSCE peacekeepers in Nagorno-Karabakh and the surrounding districts in the first and second phases, followed by the lifting of the Azerbaijani and Turkish blockades of Armenia in the third stage, and leaving for last the issues of Nagorno-Karabakh's status, the Lachin Corridor, and the return of displaced persons. When Levon Ter-Petrosyan stepped down from the presidency, he compared himself to the late Israeli Prime Minister Yitzhak Rabin, and stated that he was resigning to avoid destabilizing the country. Commenting on the circumstances of his resignation in 2021, Ter-Petrosyan insisted that Vazgen Sargsyan and Kocharyan were "ready for civil war" if he did not resign.

== Comeback ==
After his resignation, Ter-Petrosyan rarely appeared in public and avoided contact with the media, although there were speculations that he would run for the office of president of Armenia in the general election in February 2003. He instead devoted his time to scientific research. In 2005 and 2007, he published his two-volume historical work titled The Crusaders and the Armenians.

=== 2008 election ===
On 21 September 2007, Ter-Petrosyan made his first public speech in nearly ten years at an event in Yerevan marking the 16th anniversary of Armenia's declaration of independence. In this speech he was strongly critical of President Kocharyan. Subsequently, Ter-Petrosyan officially announced his candidacy in the 2008 presidential election in a speech in Yerevan on 26 October 2007. He accused Kocharyan's government of massive corruption, involving the theft of "at least three to four billion dollars" over the previous five years. He was critical of the government's claims of strong economic growth and argued that Kocharyan and his prime minister, Serzh Sargsyan, had come to accept a solution to the problem of Nagorno-Karabakh that was effectively the same solution that he had proposed ten years earlier. A number of opposition parties rallied behind him after his return to the political arena, including the People's Party of Armenia led by Stepan Demirchyan, the Republic Party led by Aram Sargsyan, the Social Democrat Hunchakian Party, "Azadakrum" movement for Jirair Sefilian, the "New Times" Party, and Raffi Hovannisian's Heritage Party.

==== Protests ====
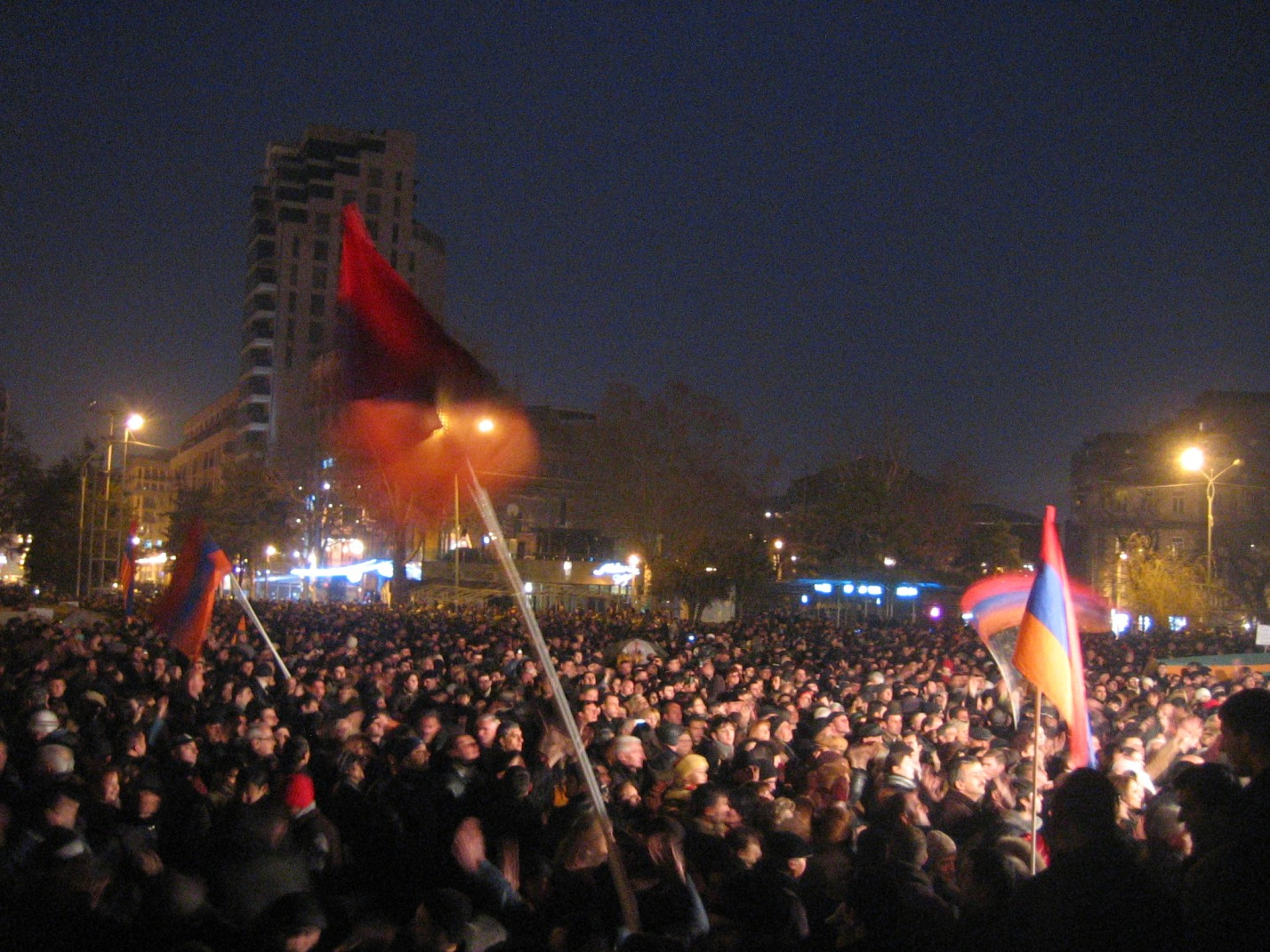
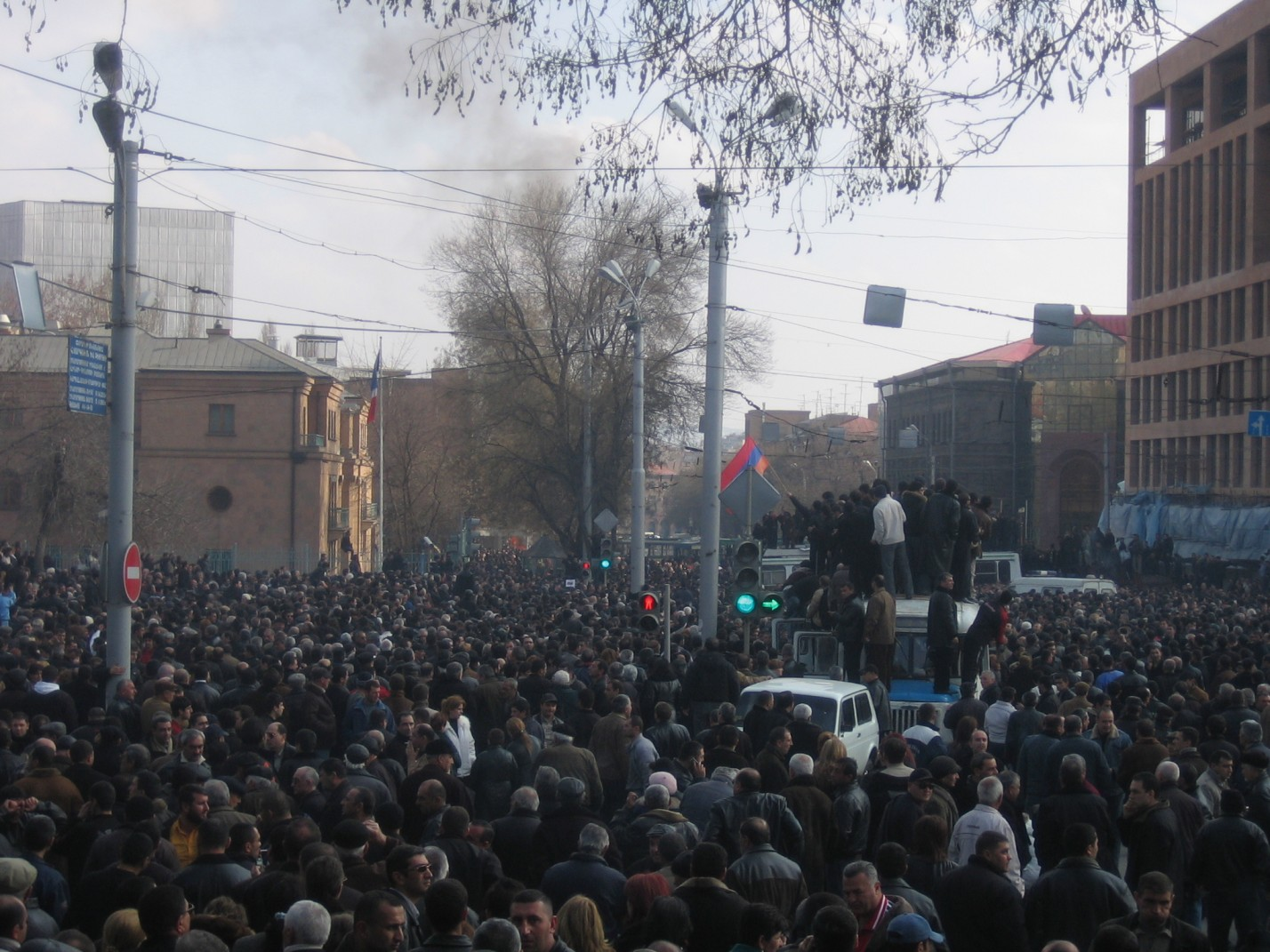
Mass protests at Freedom Square (left) and near the French embassy (right).

Final results from the election, which was held on 19 February 2008, officially showed Ter-Petrosyan in second place with 21.5% of the vote. Then he and his supporters accused the government of rigging the election and claimed victory; beginning on 20 February he led continuous protests involving tens of thousands of his supporters in Yerevan. In the early morning hours of 1 March, reportedly acting on evidence of firearms in the camp, the authorities moved in to inspect the tents set up by demonstrators. Law enforcement agents then violently dispersed hundreds of protestors. Ter-Petrosyan was placed under de facto house arrest, not being allowed to leave his home, though the authorities later denied the allegations. A few hours later, tens of thousands of protestors or more gathered at Myasnikyan Square to protest the government's act. Police, overwhelmed by the sheer size of the crowd, pulled out. A state of emergency was implemented by President Kocharyan at 17:00, allowing the army to be moved into the capital. At night, a few thousand protestors barricaded themselves using commandeered municipal buses. As a result of the clashes, eight protestors and two policemen died. Ter-Petrosyan addressed his supporters by phone at around 2–3 a.m. on March 2, telling them to go home to avoid further casualties. On March 5, Ter-Petrosyan appealed to the Constitutional Court to have the election declared invalid, which was rejected.

== Armenian National Congress ==
In 2011, Ter-Petrosyan again took a leading role in protests that erupted in Armenia as part of a wave of regional unrest. As leader of the Armenian National Congress opposition bloc, formed two years prior to the outbreak of protests, Ter-Petrosyan accused President Serzh Sargsyan, elected in the disputed 2008 election, of being "illegitimate" and called for the release of political prisoners, the resignation of the government, and a full inquiry into the violence that claimed the lives of ten people on 1 March 2008.

=== 2012 parliamentary election ===
Levon Ter-Petrosyan led the Armenian National Congress (ANC) during the 2012 parliamentary election. The ANC won 7.08% (106,903) of the popular vote.

=== 2013 presidential election ===
The ANC held its convention on 22 December 2012. Ter-Petrosyan talked about groups promoting pro-Western and pro-Russian divisions within the Armenian society and the political parties calling them "dangerous forces". Ter-Petrosyan did not announce whether he will run for president in February 2013. Few days after the convention on 25 December 2012, Ter-Petrosyan gave Chorrord Inknishkhanutyun an interview eventually declaring his decision not to run for the office. He claimed that "dozens of arguments are being put forward by those advocating and opposing my nomination, but the most important argument has been avoided. Can anyone who has respect for his people vie for a presidential post at the age of 68? Such things usually do not happen in developed democratic countries ... everything is concentrated in the hands of a bunch of criminals who have usurped power."

The official ANC statement on 27 December 2012 said that they are not participating in the upcoming presidential election in any form. The ANC claimed that the participation in the election is "legitimization of the illegal regime". Rumors about Ter-Petrosyan's possible retirement from active politics spread soon after his 25 December announcement. Armenians newspapers argued that Levon Zurabyan, the ANC speaker, could become his successor.

On 7 February 2013, Ter-Petrosyan gave another interview to the Chorrord Inknishkhanutyun daily newspaper. He acknowledged that the ANC cannot continue its activities with the same structure. He admitted that the alliance had "internal fermentations" and called "various political forces and non-partisan individuals of the Congress to merge into one single political party."

The presidential election was held on 18 February 2013. Voting in a polling station in central Yerevan, Ter-Petrosyan said the journalists he voted for the "sake of the Republic of Armenia." According to the official results, incumbent Serzh Sargsyan won with over 58% of the vote. Raffi Hovannisian, the main opposition candidate who earned 37% of the total, claimed victory and started mass protests the next day. On 23 February 2013, Ter-Petrosyan addressed the gathered at the Pan-Armenian National Movement party convention. He claimed Hovannisian won the election and accused incumbent Sargsyan in rigging the election. Talking about Hovannisian's post-election protests, Ter-Petrosyan stated "I see words, I see speeches, but there is no action, no plan of actions."

On 13 April 2013, the Armenian National Congress was officially transformed from an alliance of 18 original parties into a single party, on the base of the Pan-Armenian National Movement. During his speech at the founding convention, Ter-Petrosyan blamed Hovannisian for having no political agenda in his protests. In particular, Ter-Petrosyan said "during the current post-election period we have seen everything but political processes".

=== 2013 Yerevan election ===
The ANC, now a party rather than an alliance, went to the 2013 Yerevan City Council election alone. Their list was headed by Yerevan's former mayor Vahagn Khachatryan. ANC failed to pass the 6% threshold by gaining only 1.2%.

=== 2021 snap parliamentary election ===
Ter-Petrosyan led the ANC's electoral list in the June 2021 snap parliamentary elections. Ter-Petrosyan announced that he would not take up his parliamentary mandate if the ANC enters parliament but fails to achieve a majority. The ANC received 19,647 votes in the 2021 election, amounting to 1.54% of the vote, below the 5% threshold required to enter parliament.

== 2020 Nagorno-Karabakh war and aftermath ==
During the 2020 Nagorno-Karabakh war, Ter-Petrosyan met with fellow ex-presidents of Armenia Robert Kocharyan and Serzh Sargsyan as well as ex-presidents of the Nagorno-Karabakh Republic Arkadi Ghukasyan and Bako Sahakyan to discuss the situation. In October 2020, Kocharyan and Ter-Petrosyan requested that Prime Minister Nikol Pashinyan give them permission to go to Moscow as special negotiators. Pashinyan accepted their request to go to Moscow to meet with Russian officials, but not as official negotiators. The visit never occurred as Kocharyan tested positive for COVID-19.

After the defeat of the Armenian side in the war, the signing of the 2020 Nagorno-Karabakh ceasefire agreement and the outbreak of protests in Armenia against Prime Minister Nikol Pashinyan, Ter-Petrosyan released a statement where he warned of the risk of a destructive civil war and called for the solution of the political crisis by constitutional means only. He called for the prime minister's voluntary resignation and accused him and the opposition candidate Vazgen Manukyan of leading the country to civil confrontation through their refusal to compromise.

On 25 March 2021 Ter-Petrosyan once again met with ex-presidents Kocharyan and Sargsyan. On 5 May 2021, Ter-Petrosyan declared that the reason for the meeting was for him to propose an electoral alliance between the former presidents (his long-time political opponents) in order to unseat Prime Minister Pashinyan in the 2021 Armenian parliamentary election. Ter-Petrosyan repeated the proposal on May 5, which was rejected by both Kocharyan and Sargsyan.

== Personal life ==
He is married to Lyudmila (née Pleskovskaya); the couple has one son, David, who is an economist and businessman, and four grandchildren (Levon, Hakob, Lusia, Areg).

Ter-Petrosyan is fluent in Armenian and Russian, with working knowledge of 9 other languages.

== Select publications ==
- Ter Petrosian, Levon (1992). Ancient Armenian Translations. New York: Krikor and Clara Zohrab Information Center/St. Vartan Press.
- Ter-Petrosyan, Levon (2005). Խաչակիրները և հայերը: Հ. Ա. Ուսումնասիրություն և թարգմանություններ [The Crusaders and the Armenians: Volume I: Research and translations] (in Armenian). Yerevan.
- Ter-Petrosyan, Levon (2007). Խաչակիրները և հայերը: Հ. Բ. Պատմա-քաղաքագիտական հետազոտություն [The Crusaders and the Armenians: Volume II: Historical-political analysis] (in Armenian). Yerevan: Calouste Gulbenkian Foundation.

== Notes ==
Political offices
New office	Chairman of the Supreme Council of Armenia; 1990–1991	Succeeded by Babken Ararktsyan
New office	President of Armenia; 1991–1998	Succeeded by Robert Kocharyan
