= Caucasus Institute =

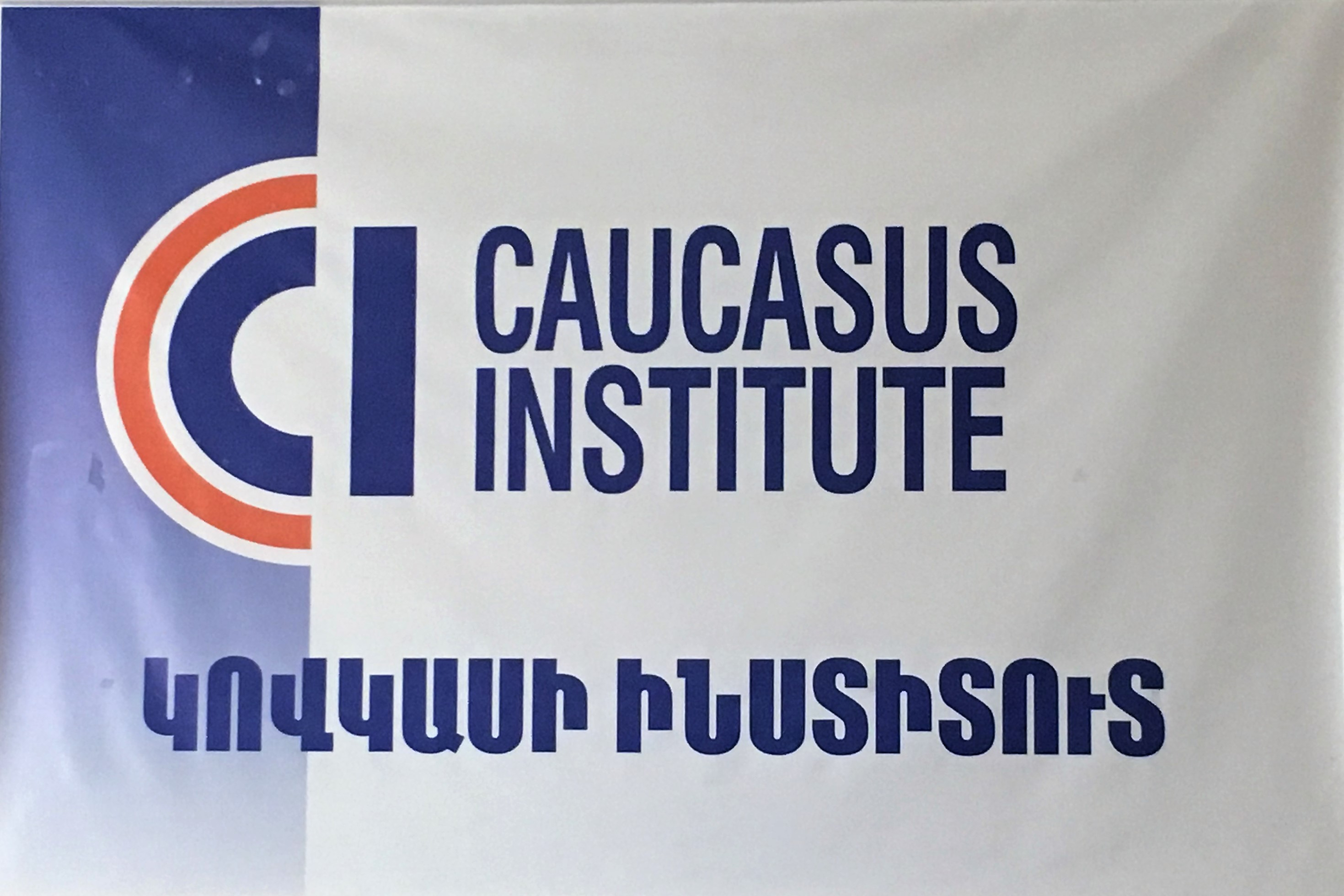
- Established: 2002
- Focus: South Caucasus political issues
- Director: Alexander Iskandaryan
- Address: Charents Street 31/4(Entrance from Aygestan 9th); 0025 Yerevan, Armenia
- Location: Yerevan, Armenia
- Website: Caucasus Institute

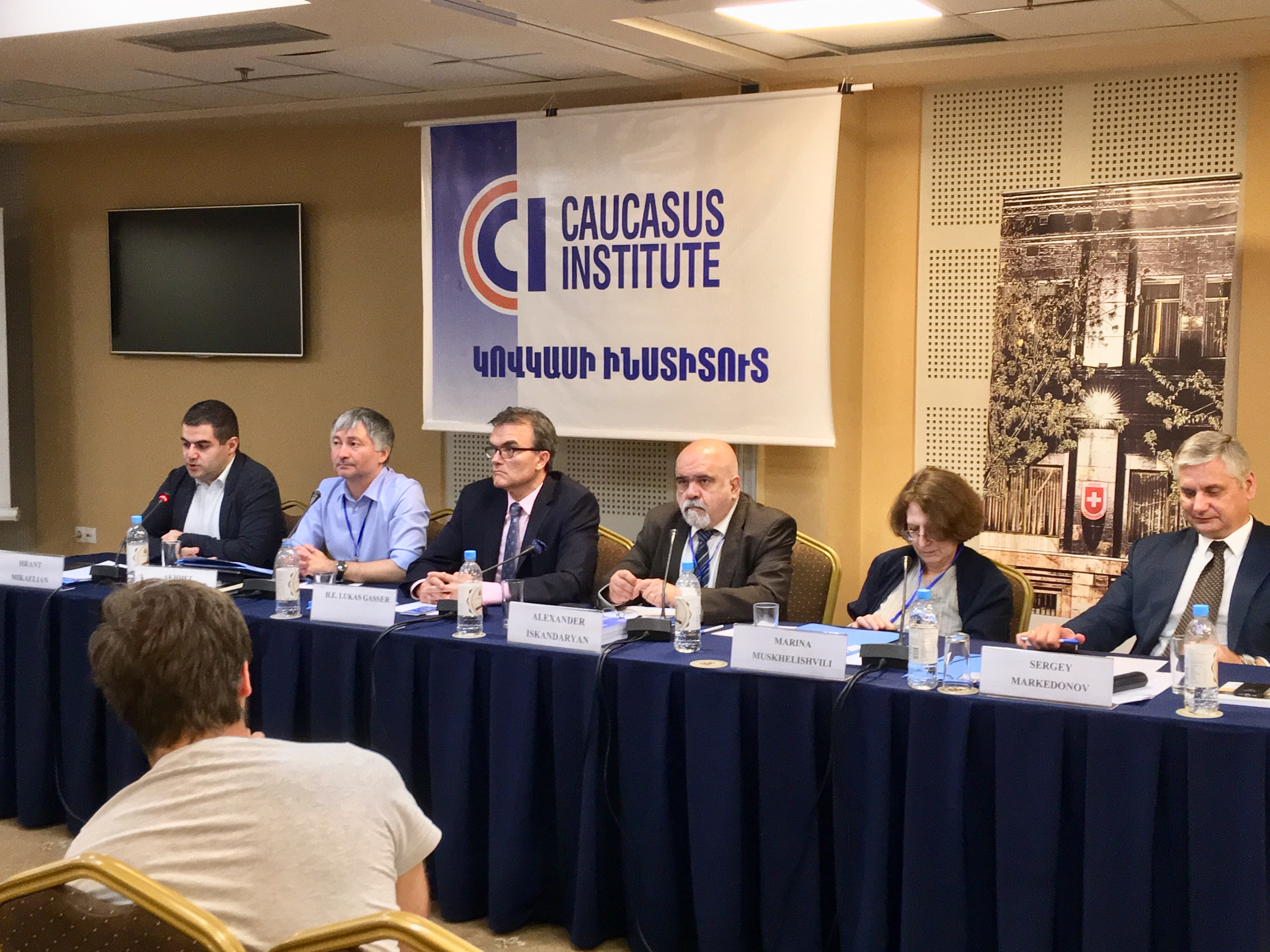
"Caucasus 2017" Annual Conference

The Caucasus Institute is a think tank and postgraduate institution. Its focus is on encouraging pluralistic discourse in the South Caucasus, including the countries of Armenia, Azerbaijan, and Georgia. Its goal is to promote inclusive policy-making in Armenia through conducting research, producing and advocating policy documents and encouraging a pluralistic and informed public policy debate.

The institute is located in downtown Yerevan. It was first founded in 2002 as the Caucasus Media Institute. In 2008, was renamed to Caucasus Institute. The institute organizes its trademark event, the Annual Caucasus Conference, international events that bring together experts from the South Caucasus (Azerbaijan, Georgia, Armenia), Russia (including the Northern Caucasus), Turkey, the U.S. and the EU to assess and discuss the situation with governance, transition and development in the region. The event is followed by the publication of CI Caucasus Yearbook in Russian, summing up the events of the yesteryear in the region. The yearbook contains the results of research on nation-building, democratization, development, regional and European integration of the Caucasus.

== History ==
The Caucasus Institute was founded in 2002 by a group of professionals who had worked in journalism, social sciences and media development in various post-Soviet countries. The Caucasus Media Institute was partly rooted in another project in the 1990s called the Caucasus Media Support Project (CMSP): a conflict resolution project implemented by journalists. Initiated from Geneva by Vicken Cheterian, and funded by the Swiss Federal Department of Foreign Affairs, its aim was to create contacts and exchanges between journalists from the various conflict regions of the South Caucasus and to give them an opportunity to report from the "other side". The assumption was that if a journalist visit an "enemy territory", they will be capable of more balanced or at least more nuanced reporting. During the CMSP, journalists from Abkhazia, Armenia, Azerbaijan, Georgia, Karabakh and South Ossetia took part in twelve meetings held in various towns of the South Caucasus. Although the project was a diplomatic success, it also showed the limits of journalism in the region. Journalists engaged in the project displayed great courage by daring to travel to the "other side". Yet, the media coverage that came out of such rich occasions was often thin, failing to capture to the experience in all its complexity and flavour.

Another project that crystallized ideas behind the CMI was Central Asia Media Support Project (CAMP), similar to the CMSP, carried out in Central Asia countries sharing the sublime, yet highly tense Fergana Valley, including Kyrgyzstan, Tajikistan and Uzbekistan. CAMP aimed at using journalism to raise awareness of the social, economic, demographic and other sources of tension in Fergana. The three founder of the Caucasus Media Institute were all engaged in the CAMP, getting rich insight into the mechanisms and limitations post Soviet media culture.

The readiness of Swiss Agency for Development and Cooperation to support a media development initiative gave the possibility to design the precise content of the initiative. During 2001, the founders conducted needs-assessment missions in Armenia, Azerbaijan and Georgia, looking at media development and its resources. in late 2001, SDC agreed to fund the project, and in February 2002 Vicken Cheterian moved from Geneva to Yerevan and started the logistic preparations together with Mark Grigorian. In April 2002, Alexander Iskandaryan and Nina Iskandaryan joined the team by moving to Yerevan from Moscow.

The Main Training Programme started in October 2002, with twelve novice journalists coming from three countries- Armenia, Moldova and Russia (Republic of Chechnya). The students took courses and did internships at local media organizations combining schooling and practice.

From its first year, CMI was more than a journalism school. The work of the Research and Publication unit focused on issues of regional interest, including elections, migration, religion and politics, nation building and conflict resolution. Though based in Yerevan, CMI began to operate on a regional scale using a multicultural approach to education. It had interns from various countries, including the U.S., the Netherlands, Germany and Switzerland, and students from Armenia, Georgia, Belarus, Kyrgyzstan, Moldova, Jordan, Southern Russia (Chehcnya, Daghestan, Karachevo-Cherkessia, Karbadino-Balkaria and North Ossetia) and de facto states such as Abkhazia, Nagorno-Karabakh and South-Ossetia.

For the 2003 parliamentary and presidential elections, the CMI published trilingual elections guides (Armenian, English, Russian) for journalists and observers.

The CMI soon started working on photojournalism. In 2003, the Amsterdam-based World Press Photo (WPP) partnered with the CI to bring its yearly exhibition to Armenia for the first time and in 2004, the cooperation was developed into yearly courses. CI invited renowned Armenian photojournalist Ruben Mangasaryan to supervise the courses with the methodological support of WPP; world-famous photo-journalists came to Yerevan and taught classes to CMI students, and the WPP exhibition visited Armenia three more times. The project brought a new visual culture to Armenia and formed a new approach to photojournalism among the young generation. Ruben prematurely died in March 2009 yet the impact of the work he did will persist for decades.

In 2004, the CMI launched a unique format of Yearly Caucasus Conferences which analyse regional developments of the previous year. The papers presented in these conferences are collected and published in a special series called the Caucasus Yearbook. Fourteen volumes of the Caucasus Yearbook have already been published, providing rich analytical material and information about the current history of the region. The Yearly Conferences and the Caucasus yearbook series constitute part of the CMI efforts to develop Caucasus Area Studies.

In 2008, the direction of the CMI decided to rename the institute to simply the "Caucasus Institute" or CI, to reflect it diverse activities, including research on contemporary politics, Caucasus area studies, advocacy and consulting.
