= Armenian National Congress =

Armenian National Congress Հայ Ազգային Կոնգրես
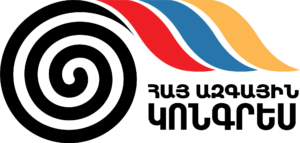
- Leader: Levon Zourabian
- Founder: Levon Ter-Petrosyan
- Founded: 1 August 2008 (as a coalition); March–April 2013 (as a party)
- Preceded by: Pan-Armenian National Movement
- Headquarters: Yerevan
- Youth wing: ANC Youth
- Ideology: Social liberalism; Pro-Europeanism
- Political position: Centre
- European affiliation: ALDE Party
- Slogan: "The Time to Get Serious"
- National Assembly: 107 / 107

Website
- anc.am

The Armenian National Congress (Armenian: Հայ Ազգային Կոնգրես, romanized: Hay Azgayin Kongres) is an Armenian political party led by former president Levon Ter-Petrosyan and was formed in 2008. Its direct predecessor was the Pan-Armenian National Movement. It is often abbreviated as ՀԱԿ or HAK, in keeping with its Armenian spelling, but it is occasionally referred to as the ANC in English, including on its official website.

From 2008 to 2013, it was a coalition of 13 opposition parties. In 2013, when certain member parties left the Pan-Armenian National Movement, the remainder of the organization collectively decided to form a new political party called the Armenian National Congress. The ANC currently does not maintain any representation within the National Assembly and acts as an extra-parliamentary force.

The party maintains a youth wing known as ANC Youth, which is a full member of the European Liberal Youth organization. The youth wing is governed by the ANC Youth Congress, which itself is a member of the International Federation of Liberal Youth.

== Ideology ==
The ANC believes in maintaining good relations with Armenia's neighbors, including normalizing relations with both Turkey and Azerbaijan, developing closer relations with the Middle East, self-determination of the Republic of Artsakh, encouraging further European integration of Armenia and deepening cooperation with the European Union, while also maintaining strong relations with the United States, Russia, Iran and with CIS member states. The party supports the development of the economy of Armenia, and increasing trade with the Eurasian Economic Union, European countries, the United States, India, and China. The party also supports developing the technology sector and improving infrastructure.

== History and electoral record ==
=== 2008 merge ===
The Impeachment Union officially dissolved in 2008, as the party opted to join the ANC.

=== 2009 municipal elections ===
The ANC participated in the 2009 Yerevan City Council election, winning 17.57% of the vote and gaining 13 seats in the Yerevan City Council.

=== 2011 protests ===
During the 2011 Armenian protests, the ANC played a major role in organizing demonstrations and pushing for the government of President Serzh Sargsyan, who defeated Ter-Petrosyan in the 2008 election, to accept the demands of protesters. The death of 10 people during protests that followed Sargsyan's disputed victory were a major rallying point for protesters.

Relations between the ANC and Heritage, a fellow opposition party, have historically been rocky, with differences in tactics during the 2011 protests widening the rift.

=== 2012 parliamentary election ===
Prior to the 2012 parliamentary elections, the ANC formed an electoral bloc with the Democratic Homeland Party, the Freedom Party, among others. The bloc also had some members from the Social Democratic Hunchakian Party, the Conservative Party, the People's Party of Armenia, and the Democratic Way Party participate under the ANC's electoral list. The ANC bloc was also supported by the Green Party of Armenia. Following the 2012 elections, the Armenian National Congress gained 7 seats in the National Assembly of Armenia.

The Democratic Homeland Party subsequently left the ANC. Also in 2012, the Armenian Liberal Party left the ANC after being a member of the party since 2008.

=== 2013 municipal elections ===
The party participated in the 2013 Yerevan City Council election, winning 4.39% of the vote, but failing to gain any seats in the Yerevan City Council.

In 2013, the Conservative Party, which had been an active member of the ANC, announced its decision to separate from the party. Also in 2013, the Armenian National Movement Party, which was previously part of the ANC, re-registered itself on 14 May as a separate political party.

=== 2015 Armenian constitutional referendum ===
In the 2015 constitutional referendum in Armenia, the ANC supported the "no" camp. ANC leader Levon Ter-Petrosyan, stated that "the constitutional changes initiated by Serzh Sargsyan was destroying the bases of the state".

=== 2017 Armenian parliamentary election ===
The ANC formed a political alliance with the People's Party of Armenia, however the alliance failed to win any seats following the election, gaining just 1.66% of the popular vote.

=== 2018 Armenian parliamentary election ===
The ANC did not participate in the 2018 Armenian parliamentary elections. The ANC endorsed the My Step Alliance.

=== 2021 Armenian parliamentary election ===
On 16 May 2021, the ANC announced that the party would participate in the 2021 elections with Levon Ter-Petrosyan leading the party's electoral list. Prior to the election, Ter-Petrosyan was very critical of Prime Minister Nikol Pashinyan and had attempted to form a united team with former presidents Robert Kocharyan and Serzh Sargsyan, however, his proposal was rejected. As such, the ANC participated in the elections independently. Following the election, the ANC gained just 1.54% of the popular vote, failing to win any seats in the National Assembly.

=== 2021 municipal elections ===
In November 2021, the party participated in local elections in the city of Goris, winning one seat in the Goris city council.

== See also ==
- Programs of political parties in Armenia
- Politics of Armenia
- Levon Zourabian
