= Hrant Bagratyan =

Armenian politician

- Հրանտ Բագրատյան
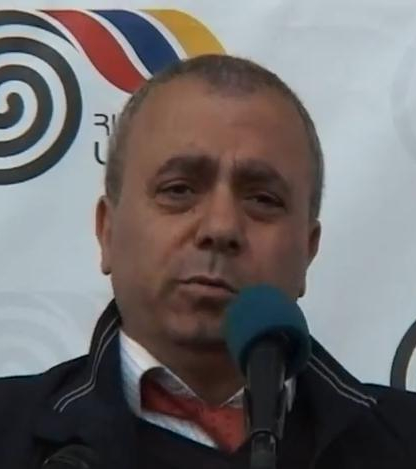
- Bagratyan in 2012

4th Prime Minister of Armenia
- In office 2 February 1993 – 4 November 1996
- President: Levon Ter-Petrosyan
- Preceded by: Khosrov Harutyunyan
- Succeeded by: Armen Sarkissian

Minister of Economy of Armenia
- In office 1991–1993
- Succeeded by: Armen Eghiazaryan
- In office 1990–1991

Personal details
- Born: 18 October 1958 (age 67) Yerevan, Armenian SSR, Soviet Union
- Party: Pan-Armenian National Movement, Free Democrats, Freedom Party

Hrant Ararati Bagratyan (Armenian: Հրանտ Արարատի Բագրատյան; born 18 October 1958) is an Armenian politician. He was the Prime Minister of Armenia from 2 February 1993 until 4 November 1996, and a former member of the Pan-Armenian National Movement political party. He is the current leader of the Freedom Party.

== Education ==
Hrant Bagratyan completed his primary and secondary education at School No. 49 from 1965 to 1975. He then pursued higher education at Yerevan State University from 1975 to 1979 before continuing his studies at the Institute of National Economy of Armenia. Between 1976 and 1978, he also studied at the Institute of National Economy’s Faculty of Public Law, earning a qualification as a lawyer.

Furthering his academic career, Bagratyan undertook postgraduate studies at the Institute of Economics of the National Academy of Sciences of Armenia from 1983 to 1986. In 1987, he successfully defended his Ph.D. thesis on the topic of “Material Stimulation of Branch Scientific-Research Institutes (SRI) and Design Departments (DD).”

== Professional career ==
- 1979 - Engineer at "Armelectromash", Yerevan.
- 1979–1981 - Military Service, Moscow.
- 1981–1983 - Deputy Director at "Soyuzkhimreactiv", Yerevan.
- 1983–1986 - Post Graduate Student at the Institute of Economy of Armenian National Academy of Sciences.
- 1987–1989 - Senior scientific worker at the Institute of Economy of Armenian National Academy of Sciences.
- 1989–1990 - Head of Division at the Institute of Economy of Armenian National Academy of Sciences.
- 1990–1991 - Minister of Economy of Armenia, First Deputy of the Prime-Minister of Armenia.
- 1991–1991 - Acting Prime Minister of Armenia.
- 1991–1993 - Minister of Economy, Vice-Prime Minister of Armenia.
- 1993–1996 - Prime Minister of Armenia.
- 1996–1997 - Consultant of the International Monetary Fund, energy expert.
- 1998–2006 - Vice-President of the Board, Director of HR and Grape Purchase of Yerevan Brandy Company (Group Pernod Ricard).
- 2006–2007 - Consultant at VTB Armenia Bank
- 2007–2025 - Russian-Armenian University, professor (Yerevan, Armenia), Kyiv International University (Kyiv, Ukraine), professor at the University of Banking affairs of the National Bank of Ukraine.

== Megaeconomics ==
Hrant Bagratyan is the author of 101 scientific articles and 18 monographs. He is the founder of the new term "megaeconomics" and the theory behind this term. He considers megaeconomics as his greatest scientific achievement.

According to the developments in the economic theory and its flexibility being dependent on changing circumstances and changing world, Bagratyan argues, that along with microeconomics and macroeconomics, there must also be a place for "megaeconomics", where economies are confronted in another, more global dimension.

Hrant Bagratyan is also the author of the theory of innovation cycles. He believes that as society develops, management should periodically decentralize and centralize, depending on what stage of the cycle the society is at. These constant compressions and expansions determine the development of societies.

== Publications ==
105 published works including 20 monographs

1. Monograph Material Stimulation of scientific-technical progress in Production, Yerevan, pub. House, Academy of Science ASR, 1989 (in Russian), 10.7 quires, Printed.
2. Monograph Payments Arrears in the Gas and Electric Power Sectors of the Russian Federation and Ukraine, IMF, 1997, Washington (in English), 1.5 quires, Printed.
3. Monograph State and Society, Moscow, Izograf 2000 (in Russian), 23 quires, Printed.
4. Monograph Land Reform: Issues of Theory and Practice, 30 quires, Printed.
5. Monograph Armenia on a Frontier of Centuries, Yerevan, Nairi, 2003 (in Armenian), Printed.
6. Monograph Integration of Ukraine and Russia in to European labor space, Kyiv, UBS NBU, 2010 (in Ukrainian), Printed.
7. Monograph "Megaeconomics and global macroeconomic problems" /Hrant Bagratyan, Iryna Kravchenko. — K.: UB NBU, 2013. — 247 p.
8. Monograph "Введение в мегаэкономику: теория, методология, практика: монография"/ Грант Багратян, Ирина Кравченко. — К.: УБД, НБУ, 2012. — 158 с.
9. Monograph "Мегаэкономика и глобальные экономические проблемы: учебно-методическое пособие. Второе переработанное издание"/ Г.А.Багратян - Ер.: Издательство РАУ, 2025. - 260 стр.

== Awards ==
- 1995 - “The Men of the Year” of ABI (American Biographical Institute).
- 1996 - “The Men of the Millennium” of ABI (American Biographical Institute).
- 1997 - Recognized PhD candidate by International Monetary Fund, Washington D.C.
- 2006 - Recognized as the best economic public man of Armenia during the whole period of the independency of the country in 1991-2006 by independent journalists.
- 2005 - Received PhD in Economics by Higher Attestation Committee of the Ministry of Education of the Russian Federation, Moscow.
- 2010 - Received PhD in Economics by Higher Attestation Committee of Ukraine, Kyiv.
- 2025 - Recognized as the most popular economist of Armenia in 2025 by Euromedia group in 2025

Political offices
Preceded by Khosrov Harutyunyan	Prime Minister of Armenia; 1993–1996	Succeeded by Armen Sarkissian
