= Artsakh Revival Day =

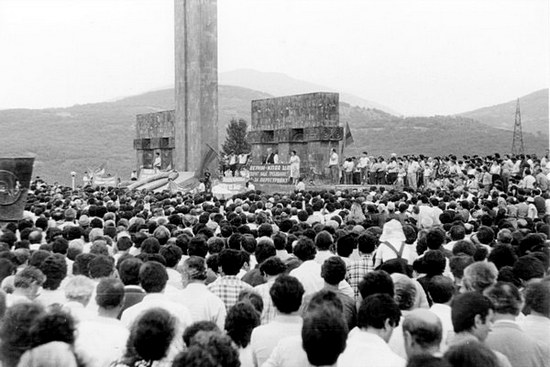
- The first protests of the Karabakh movement at the Stepanakert Memorial, 20 February 1988.
- Significance: It celebrates the first protests that led to the start of the Karabakh movement.
- Begins: 20 February, 1992
- Ends: 20 February, 2023 (officially); 20 February, 2024 (unofficially)
- Frequency: Annual

Artsakh Revival Day (Armenian: Արցախի վերածննդի օր) was an official national holiday celebrated in the now former breakaway Republic of Artsakh, celebrating the first protests that led to the start of the Karabakh movement on 20 February.

== History ==
In 1985, Mikhail Gorbachev became the new general secretary of the CPSU, implementing a planned reform of the Soviet Union. The two reforms were known as perestroika and glasnost, the latter of which granted the freedom for Soviet citizens to express any grievances whereas the former allowed economic reform in the Soviet system. This came at a time when support for the integration of Nagorno Karabakh into the Armenian SSR was high, with the movement for this change dating back to a petition in 1963. Capitalizing on Gorbachev's policies, the leaders of the regional Supreme Soviet of the Nagorno-Karabakh Autonomous Oblast voted in favor of separating itself from the Azerbaijan SSR and unifying with Soviet Armenia on 20 February 1988. A couple days later, Boris Kevorkov, who served as the unpopular First Secretary of the Nagorno-Karabakh Regional Committee of the Communist Party of Azerbaijan, was fired by the Supreme Soviet. The actions of the Soviets saw the events at Sumgait to occur as well as marked beginning of the First Nagorno-Karabakh War.

== Significance ==
The date became an official holiday in 1992. Official greetings are extended from the President of Armenia, the Prime Minister of Armenia and the President of Artsakh among other major leaders. Former leaders such as Robert Kocharyan have also extended greetings on the holiday. In 2020, Artsakh President Bako Sahakyan described it as "the symbol of our people’s courage, determination and love for freedom, our nation-wide solidarity". A reception is usually held in Stepanakert, with veterans of the Artsakh Movement, state officials, high-ranking officers of the Artsakh Defense Army, and representatives of political and public organizations attending.
