= Boris Kevorkov =

Azerbaijani politician

First Secretary of the Nagorno-Karabakh Autonomous Oblast Committee of the Communist Party of Azerbaijan
- In office 1973 – 24 February 1988
- Preceded by: Gurgen Melkumyan
- Succeeded by: Genrikh Poghosyan

Personal details
- Born: 8 January 1932 Shamakhi, Azerbaijan Soviet Socialist Republic, Soviet Union
- Died: 20 December 1998 (aged 66) Moscow, Russia
- Party: CPSU

Boris Sarkisovich Kevorkov (Russian: Борис Саркисович Кеворков Armenian: Բորիս Կևորկով) (8 January 1932 – 20 December 1998) was the First Secretary of the Nagorno-Karabakh Autonomous Oblast Committee of the Communist Party of Azerbaijan. He was appointed in 1973 and was dismissed in February 1988.

== Biography ==
Kevorkov was born on 8 January 1932 in Shamakhi to an Armenian family. He was appointed Secretary of the Nagorno-Karabakh Autonomous Oblast in 1973, the middle of the Brezhnev era. His predecessor Gurgen Melkumyan was removed after leader of the Communist Party of Azerbaijan SSR Heydar Aliyev came into conflict with the Armenian leadership of the autonomous oblast. Melkumyan was a native of Nagorno-Karabakh, unlike Kevorkov.

Although an Armenian, Kevorkov was very loyal to Aliyev and other Azerbaijani leaders in Baku, and was resented by the Armenian community. He was married to an Azerbaijani woman. Kevorkov reportedly never once visited Armenia during his fourteen years in the post.

During the Karabakh movement, 87 Armenian deputies from the Regional Soviet called an emergency session of the assembly on 20 February 1988 in response to Armenian demonstrations in Stepanakert calling for the unification of Karabakh and Armenia. Kevorkov and First Secretary of the Azerbaijan Communist Party Kamran Baghirov tried and failed to stop the session from taking place. Late in the evening, 110 Armenian deputies voted unanimously for the resolution, calling for Nagorno-Karabakh to join Soviet Armenia. The Azerbaijani deputies refused to vote. Kevorkov tried to steal the stamp needed to confirm the resolution.

On 24 February 1988, Kevorkov was removed from office by Moscow emissaries. His deputy, Genrikh Poghosyan, who was much more popular among Armenians, took his place.

== Last years ==
As the First Nagorno-Karabakh War intensified, Kevorkov decided to move to Moscow, but was arrested at the airport by the Azerbaijani authorities on May 24, 1992. Kevorkov was released from a Baku jail in 1993 by the decree of President Heydar Aliyev. He subsequently settled in Moscow and worked as a middle school history teacher. He died there in 20 December 1998.

== Bibliography ==
- Malkasian, Mark (1996), Gha-ra-bagh!, Wayne State University Press, ISBN 0-8143-2604-8
- de Waal, Thomas (2003). Black Garden: Armenia and Azerbaijan Through Peace and War. New York: New York University Press. ISBN 9780814719459.
- Kaufman, Stuart J. (2001), Modern Hatreds: The Symbolic Politics of Ethnic War, Cornell University Press, ISBN 0-8014-8736-6
