= Karabakh movement =

National liberation movement, 1988–1991

- Part of the Nagorno-Karabakh conflict, First Nagorno-Karabakh War and the dissolution of the Soviet Union
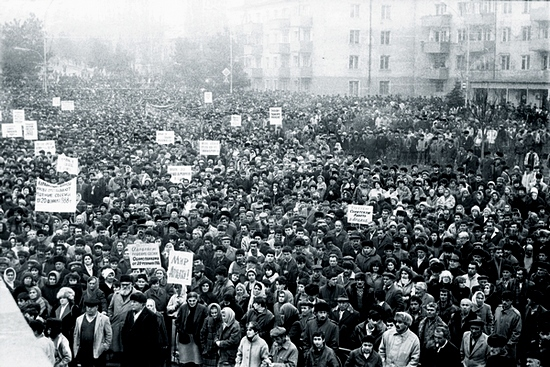
- The first major demonstration in Stepanakert, 13 February 1988
- Date: 13 February 1988 – 30 April 1991 (3 years, 2 months, 2 weeks and 3 days)
- Location: Armenian SSR (mainly Yerevan); Nagorno-Karabakh AO (mainly Stepanakert)
- Goals: Self-determination for the Karabakh Armenians, unification of Nagorno-Karabakh with Armenia
- Methods: Demonstrations, sit-ins, strikes, hunger strike, student protest, civil disobedience
- Result: Establishment of the Nagorno-Karabakh Republic; Escalation of the First Nagorno-Karabakh War

Parties
Karabakh Committee (1988–1989); Pan-Armenian National Movement (1989–1991) / Armenian SSR	Soviet Union: / Azerbaijan SSR; Azerbaijani Popular Front Party

Lead figures
/ Levon Ter-Petrosyan; Vazgen Manukyan; Movses Gorgisyan; Babken Ararktsyan; Igor Muradyan	(Soviet Union) Mikhail Gorbachev (Azerbaijan Soviet Socialist Republic) / Kamran Baghirov (Azerbaijan Soviet Socialist Republic) / Abdurrahman Vazirov (Azerbaijan Soviet Socialist Republic) / Ayaz Mutallibov Abulfaz Elchibey

Number
Yerevan: 200,000 (24-25 February 1988); 1 million (26 February 1988); 300,000 (May 1988); 400,000 (January 1990); Stepanakert: 100,000 (25 February 1988); 120,000 (26 February 1988)	

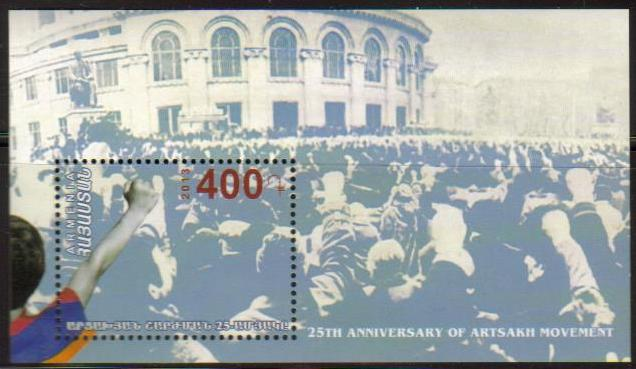
A 2013 post stamp dedicated to the 25th anniversary of the movement showing people with raised fists in Yerevan's Theatre Square and the Opera Theatre in the background in 1988

The Karabakh movement (Armenian: Ղարաբաղյան շարժում "Gharapaghyan sharjhum"), also known as the Artsakh movement (Armenian: Արցախյան շարժում), was a national liberation movement in Armenia and Nagorno-Karabakh from 1988 to 1991 that advocated for the reunification of the Nagorno-Karabakh Autonomous Oblast (NKAO) – an autonomous enclave within Soviet Azerbaijan – with Soviet Armenia. The movement was motivated by fears of cultural and physical erasure under government policies from Azerbaijan. Throughout the Soviet period, Azerbaijani authorities implemented policies aimed at suppressing Armenian culture and diluting the Armenian majority in Nagorno-Karabakh through various means, including border manipulations, encouraging the exodus of Armenians, and settling Azerbaijanis in the region. In the 1960s, 1970s, and 1980s, Armenians protested against Azerbaijan's cultural and economic marginalization The concept of reunification (“Miatsum”) was so deeply embedded among Armenians in Nagorno-Karabakh that the region was almost universally regarded as an integral part of Armenia rather than a distinct entity.

Armenians had petitioned Soviet authorities to transfer the mostly Armenian-populated Nagorno-Karabakh Autonomous Oblast (NKAO) in Azerbaijan to Armenia. By 1988, nearly one million Armenians from several regions of the republic engaged in regular demonstrations, centered on Yerevan's Theater Square (today Freedom Square).

The Karabakh Committee, a group of ethnic Armenian intellectuals from Armenia along with the Karabakh-based local group "Krunk", led the movement. After 1989, the movement transformed into the Pan-Armenian National Movement (HHSh) and won majority in the 1990 parliamentary election. In 1991, both Armenia and Nagorno-Karabakh declared independence from the Soviet Union. A referendum in 1988 was held to transfer the region to Soviet Armenia, citing self-determination laws in the Soviet constitution. (Note: According to the Constitution of the USSR, if a union republic voted to leave the Soviet Union, its autonomous republics, autonomous oblasts, and autonomous okrugs had the right to hold their own referendums to independently decide whether to remain in the USSR or to leave alongside the seceding union republic. They also had the right to raise questions regarding their own state-legal status.) This act was met with a series of pogroms against Armenians across Azerbaijan, and in November 1991, the Azerbaijani government passed a motion aimed at abolishing the autonomy of the NKAO and prohibiting the use of Armenian placenames in the region. Initially, the movement relied on non-violent means, including petitions, marches, vigils, hunger strikes, demonstrations, and general strikes, and was met with anti-Armenian violence. By 1992, the conflict had escalated into the First Nagorno-Karabakh War.

Up until the 2018 Armenian Revolution, the Karabakh Movement was the largest mass movement in Armenian history. It was also the largest instance of public mobilization in the Soviet Union since its formative years in the 1920s. At one point in the movement, up to a million protestors were mobilized in Yerevan.

Azerbaijan's inability to suppress the Karabakh Movement has significantly influenced Azeri nationalism, which is widely considered institutionally anti-Armenian.

== Background ==
During the Soviet Era, the Armenians of Nakhichevan and of Lachin were subjected to gradual ethnic cleansing by Soviet Azeri authorities resulting in the exodus of all Armenians from the region. During the Soviet Era, Armenians were scapegoated for state, societal and economic shortcomings in Azerbaijan. The Karabakh Movement is characterized as a struggle for national liberation by both Armenians and others. The concept of reunification (“Miatsum”) was so deeply embedded among Armenians in Nagorno-Karabakh that the region was almost universally regarded as an integral part of Armenia rather than a distinct entity. Nagorno-Karabakh was unique in the Soviet Union as the only autonomous region whose ethnic majority matched that of a neighboring republic (Armenia) but was not allowed to join it.

Building on these grievances, Armenian intellectuals within the Karabakh Movement also rejected the long-standing belief that Armenia’s membership of the USSR was necessary for protection against Turkey. Up until Armenia's incorporation into the Soviet Union, the Republic of Turkey and its Ottoman predecessor had aimed at eliminating Armenia and transforming it into a Turkish protectorate or vassal state. Led by figures such as Levon Ter-Petrosyan and Vazgen Manukyan, Armenian intellectuals aimed for complete independence and the possibility of peaceful coexistence with neighboring states, marking a fundamental shift in Armenian political thought.

=== Suppression of Armenian culture in Nagorno-Karabakh ===
Although the Karabakh Movement came to a flashpoint in 1988, its origins date back to the 1920s, during which it was suppressed by the Soviet authorities. For decades, an underground movement in Nagorno-Karabakh sought unification with Armenia. During periods of political easing or major change in the USSR—such as in 1945, 1965, and 1977—Armenians submitted letters and petitions to Moscow requesting that Nagorno-Karabakh be transferred to Soviet Armenia.

Between 1921 and 1990, under the control of the Azerbaijan SSR within the USSR, Armenians in Nagorno-Karabakh faced economic marginalization, deportation, and cultural discrimination, leading to a significant exodus. Meanwhile, authorities encouraged the inflow of Azeris from outside Nagorno-Karabakh. This policy – sometimes called a "White Genocide" – aimed at "de-Armenizing" the territory culturally and then physically and followed a similar pattern to Azerbaijan's treatment of Armenians in Nakhchivan. Census data from the Soviet period reflects these demographic shifts. The city of Shusha—once a major center of Armenian cultural life within Nagorno-Karabakh—became overwhelmingly Azerbaijani. In 1959, Armenians constituted 84.4% of Nagorno-Karabagh’s population; twenty years later, their share had fallen to 76%.

The suppression of Armenian language and culture was widespread; many Armenian churches, cemeteries, and schools were closed or destroyed, clerics arrested, and Armenian historical education was banned. The Armenian educational institutions that remained were under the administration of the Azeri Ministry of Education, which enforced prohibitions against teaching Armenian history and using Armenian materials and led to a curriculum that significantly differed from that of Armenia itself. Moreover, restrictions limited cultural exchanges and communication between Nagorno-Karabakh Armenians and Armenia, with significant neglect in transportation and communication infrastructure. Health clinics were restricted from Armenian villages and limited to Azerbaijani villages. In 1936, First Secretary of the Communist Party of Armenia Aghasi Khanjian was murdered by the deputy head (and soon head) of the NKVD Lavrentiy Beria after submitting Armenian grievances to Stalin, which included requests to return Nagorno-Karabakh and Nakhichevan to Armenia.

The Azerbaijani government's decree in 1957 that Azerbaijani was to be the main language and the alteration of educational content to favor Azerbaijani history over Armenian exemplify the systemic efforts to assimilate the Armenian population culturally. The 1981 "law of the NKAO" denied additional rights, restricted cultural connections between Nagorno-Karabakh and Armenia, and removed provisions that had explicitly listed Armenian as a working language to be used by local authorities. Resentment against what was perceived as a forced "Azerification" campaign led to a mass movement for reunification with Armenia.

== Escalation of movement in 1988 ==
The beginning of the movement is widely considered to have escalated on February 13 when the first major demonstration occurred in Stepanakert, Nagorno-Karabakh. Several hundred Karabakh Armenians held an unsanctioned rally in Lenin Square calling for unification with Armenia. Addressing the crowd, actress Zhanna Galstian said she felt happy "because by coming out here, the Karabakhi has killed the slave in himself," prompting chants of "Miatsum!" ("Unity!"). On 15 February 1988, during a gathering of the Armenian Writers’ Union—one of the most vocal organizations in the country—the poet Silva Kaputikian voiced her backing for the Armenians of Karabakh. On 20 February 1988, just before the Regional Soviet convened in Stepanakert, 30,000 people gathered in protest in Freedom Square, and the crowd doubled each day. By 22 February, the protests in Stepanakert exceeded 100,000, rose to about 300,000 the following day, and a transport strike was launched in Yerevan. The unprecedented mass rallies swept both the Armenian SSR and the Nagorno-Karabakh Autonomous Oblast, marking the largest public mobilization seen in the Soviet Union since the 1920s.

On 20 February 1988, the Soviet of the Nagorno-Karabakh Autonomous Region voted 110-17 in favor of uniting with Armenia. adopting a resolution "welcoming the wishes of the workers" and calling on higher authorities to show "deep understanding of the aspirations of the Armenian population." Though couched in formal language, the measure effectively sought the region’s transfer from Soviet Azerbaijan to Soviet Armenia, amounting to a challenge to established Soviet internal borders. According to the journalist Thomas de Waal, this resolution was "truly revolutionary" since "the Karabakh Armenians were, in effect, making politics from below for the first time in the Soviet Union since the 1920s."

In March 1988, Armenian radicals created "Krunk"—named after the crane as a symbol of longing for Armenia—and it became the first organization in the late Soviet Union to deploy strikes as a political weapon. Levon Ter-Petrosian, the first prime minister of Armenia, later acknowledged that unification with Armenia was the catalyst of the 1988 movement but not necessarily its ultimate objective. He described a split between early activists who sought to resolve Karabakh within the Soviet system and those who concluded that the system itself had to be transformed in order to solve the issue.

In the first half of 1988, strikes shut down factories in Nagorno-Karabakh and started to disrupt the tightly interconnected Soviet command economy.

== Response by the central government of the Soviet Union ==
The central Soviet government responded to the Karabakh Movement by attempting to contain the crisis without altering republican borders, pairing limited administrative and economic measures with growing reliance on force. In July 1988, the USSR Supreme Soviet’s Presidium rejected demands to transfer Nagorno-Karabakh from Azerbaijan to Armenia on constitutional grounds. As violence escalated, Moscow deployed internal troops and security forces, imposed emergency measures in affected areas, and in 1991 participated in Operation Ring—a joint Soviet–Azerbaijani campaign that involved mass arrests and the forced removal of Armenian villagers from multiple settlements within Nagorno-Karabakh and the surrounding areas. The USSR never recognized either unification with Armenia or Nagorno-Karabakh’s independence.

The Politburo initially rejected the demands of the Regional Soviet of Nagorno-Karabakh and portrayed the Armenians of Nagorno-Karabakh as disloyal "extremists." The Politburo’s adviser on nationalities, Vyacheslav Mikhailov, later stated, "This was something completely new for us." The movement came from within a Soviet institution, and Karabakh Armenians argued they were simply reviving Lenin’s slogan, "All power to the Soviets."

On 3 March 1988, Mikhail Gorbachev (the leader of the Soviet Union) told the Politburo that it had failed to recognize clear warning signs. He noted that although the Central Committee had received five hundred letters about Nagorny Karabakh over three years, they were met with only routine replies and little real attention; however, declassified records from June 1988 suggest that Gorbachev never planned to transfer Nagorno-Karabakh to Armenia, yet he hesitated to firmly oppose the Armenian demonstrators.

After Azerbaijan engaged in anti-Armenian pogroms in Sumgait, Moscow dismissed local officials, initiated prosecutions, expanded the use of internal security forces, and later replaced the first secretaries of both Armenia and Azerbaijan, while relying on emergency governance tools such as curfews and restrictions on gatherings. In July 1988, the central government publicly reaffirmed its position in a Supreme Soviet presidium session, rejecting the transfer of Nagorno-Karabakh while acknowledging grievances and promising Union-level involvement. After that, Moscow pursued a practical workaround: it increased direct central oversight in Karabagh by sending Arkady Volsky with extraordinary authority, reducing effective Azerbaijani control without formally altering jurisdiction, and in January 1989 it formalized this approach by placing the region under a special administration responsible to the central government. At the same time, the Soviet authorities acted against Armenian movement leaders and organizations through denunciations, investigations, and arrests—steps that intensified under emergency conditions following the December 1988 earthquake.

== Response in Azerbaijan ==
The sudden events in Nagorno-Karabakh in February 1988 surprised Azerbaijan, revealing both its underlying insecurities and a longstanding lack of awareness of how deeply Armenians cared about the region. Soviet Azerbaijani authorities categorically rejected petitions made by the Armenians of Nagorno-Karabakh to secede, declaring the unanimous vote made by the enclave's legislature in June 1988 to be "null and void." The Karabakh Movement was met with extreme violence from Azerbaijani authorities and civilians, escalating tensions and culminating in the First Nagorno-Karabakh War. The anti-Armenian violence between 1988 and 1992, described by Genocide Watch as a "campaign of terror," heightened fears of another Armenian genocide, leading to the flight of 350,000 Armenians from Azerbaijan.

Between 1988 and 1992, Azerbaijani authorities and civilians engaged in actions to accelerate the elimination of Armenians and settle Azerbaijanis in their place. Notable instances include pogroms in Sumgait (1988), Kirovabad (1988), and Baku (1990), as well as Operation Ring (1991), and the Maraga Massacre (1992). The journalist De Waal stated that the Popular Front of Azerbaijan (forerunner of the Azerbaijani Popular Front Party) was responsible for the mass pogrom in Baku, as they shouted "Long live Baku without Armenians!" The anti-Armenian pogroms in Azerbaijan involved elements of premeditation, such as the use of lists to target Armenians specifically and hand-made weapons. The perpetrators targeted the victims based solely on their Armenian ethnicity. The apartments of Armenians (which were marked in advance) were attacked and the residents were indiscriminately murdered, raped, and mutilated by the Azerbaijani rioters. Looting, arson and destruction of Armenian property was also perpetrated. Azerbaijani authorities took no action to stop the atrocities, and the failure to conduct a timely, thorough investigation or hold the perpetrators accountable, further escalated tensions. Many of those who participated in the massacre were later hailed as national heroes. Following the devastating 1988 Spitak earthquake in Armenia, which killed tens of thousands, multiple countries sent humanitarian aid, while pianist Evgeny Kissin claimed that Azerbaijan sent only crutches and coffin nails.

Russian political writer Roy Medvedev and USSR Journalists' Union described the pogroms as a genocide against Armenians. Sociologist Donald E. Miller and historian Richard Hovannisian, note that the 1988 pogroms against Armenians, while horrific, only explained the mass flight of Armenians when seen as a precursor to genocide, as many who fled left behind well-established homes, jobs, and property. Many observers compared the plight of Armenians in Nagorno-Karabakh with those that were persecuted in Turkey and Azerbaijan during the Armenian Genocide. In 1989, Nobel Peace Prize laureate Andrei Sakharov wrote "the Armenian people are again facing the threat of genocide...for Nagorno-Karabakh this is a question of survival, for Azerbaijan—just a question of ambition."

In 1990, a group of 130 prominent academics — including Jacques Derrida, Isaiah Berlin, Alain Finkielkraut, Richard Rorty — published a letter condemning anti-Armenian violence in Azerbaijan. They warned that "flagrant violations of human rights a half century after the genocide of the Jewish people in Nazi concentration camps" reflected the enduring threat of racism and called for international action. Citing repeated attacks that "followed the same pattern," the signatories argued these were no "accidents or spontaneous outbursts," but that "crimes against the Armenian minority have become consistent practice – if not consistent policy – in Soviet Azerbaijan." Azeri academic Ziya Bunyadov, gained notoriety for his article "Why Sumgait?" in which he blamed the Armenian victims themselves for orchestrating the pogrom—a stance that led British journalist Thomas de Waal, to describe him as "Azerbaijan’s foremost Armenophobe."

In November 1991, the Azerbaijani government passed a motion to abolish the autonomy of the NKAO and facilitate a form of culturally motivated ethnic cleansing by enforcing the exclusive use of Azerbaijani placenames for the cities of Stepanakert, Mardakert, and Martuni. In 1991, two groups of independent international experts visited the Caucasus and concluded that Azerbaijan was the primary aggressor in the conflict, aiming to ethnically cleanse Armenians from Nagorno-Karabakh. The experts cited several reasons for their conclusion: the brutal deportations, the blockades of Armenia and Nagorno-Karabakh, and the use of particular military equipment against civilians and civilian areas.

== Leaders and prominent voices in the movement ==
The leaders of the movement included people from the Karabakh Committee as well as others.

The Karabakh Committee was formed in May 1988 and comprised activists, demonstration-organizers, professors, and environmentalists.

- Levon Ter-Petrosyan
- Vazgen Manukyan
- Vano Siradeghyan
- Babken Ararktsyan
- Ashot Manucharyan
- David Vardanyan
- Rafael Ghazaryan
- Hambardzum Galstyan
- Silva Kaputikyan
- Arkady Manucharov
- Robert Kocharyan
- Serzh Sargsyan

== Miatsum ==
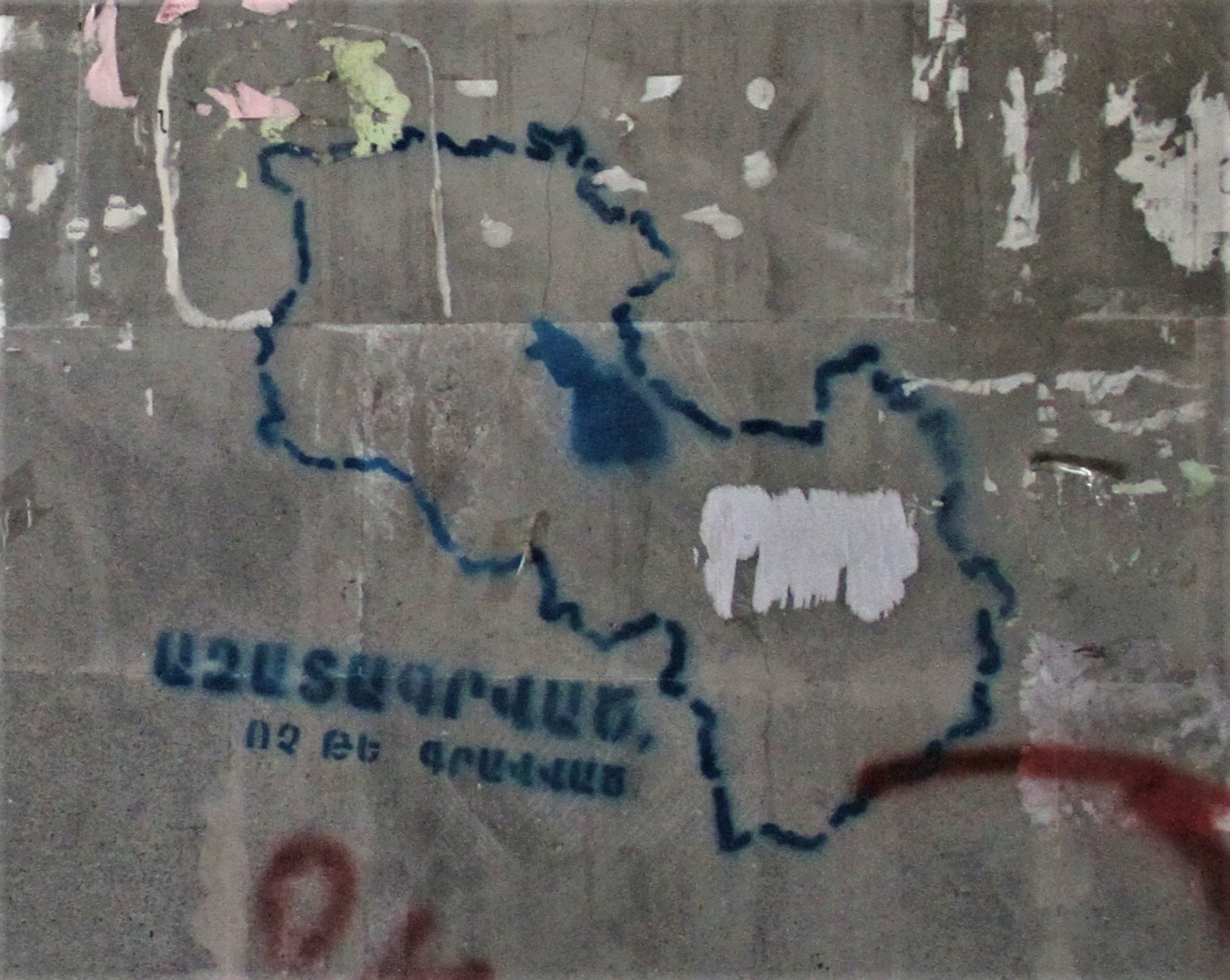
Graffiti in Yerevan with the outline of a united Armenia and Republic of Artsakh, with text in Armenian saying "Liberated, not occupied"

Miatsum (Armenian: Միացում, romanized: Unification) was a concept and a slogan used during the Karabakh movement in the late 1980s and early 1990s, which led to the First Nagorno-Karabakh War in 1992–1994.

== Timeline ==
=== 1987 ===
- September: the Union for National Self-Determination, the first non-Communist party, established in Armenia by Paruyr Hayrikyan
- October 17: the first protests concerning ecological issues held in Yerevan
- October 18: a minor rally on Freedom Square, Yerevan for the unification of the NKAO with Soviet Armenia
- August 1987: a petition calling for reunification in the name of Leninist traditions, signed by approximately 75,000 Armenians, was submitted to Mikhail Gorbachev.

=== 1988 ===
- February 13: First demonstration in Stepanakert. Traditionally considered the start of the movement. Approximately 8,000 people attend the demonstration.
- February 18–26: Major demonstrations held in Yerevan for the unification of the NKAO with Soviet Armenia. By 20 February, 30,000 people gathered in protest in Freedom Square in Yerevan, Armenia with the crowd doubling each day.
- February 20: The NKAO Supreme Council issued a request to transfer the region to Soviet Armenia.
- February 22–23: Local Armenians and Azerbaijanis clash in Askeran, resulting in several deaths. By 22 February, the protests in Yerevan, Armenia rose to between 300,000 to one million the following day, and a transport strike was launched in Yerevan.
- February 26: Demonstrations paused after Mikhail Gorbachev's asked for time to develop a position.
- February 27–29: Sumgait pogrom starts, Armenians of Azerbaijan start to leave in large numbers
- March 9: Gorbachev meets with the leaders of Armenia and Azerbaijan Karen Demirchyan and Kamran Baghirov in Moscow to discuss the public demands of unification of the NKAO with Soviet Armenia
- March 22: Over 100,000 people discontented with the tendencies demonstrate in Yerevan.
- March 23: The Supreme Soviet of the Soviet Union rejects the demand of NKAO Regional Party.
- March 25: Gorbachev rejects Armenian claims, forbade demonstrations in Yerevan.
- March 26: Despite not being authorized by the Moscow government, tens of thousands demonstrate in Yerevan.
- March 30: NKAO Communist Party adopts a resolution demanding unification.
- April 24: Hundreds of thousands of Armenians march to the genocide memorial in Yerevan.
- May 12–16: A general strike is launched in Stepanakert, Nagorno-Karabakh that forces the shutdown of factories and public transportation.
- May 21: Karen Demirchyan resigns.
- May 28: Flag of Armenia first raised in front of Matenadaran.
- June 4–15: Peaceful protests intensify in Yerevan and Stepanakert, with hundreds of students staging hunger strikes and sit-ins demanding reunification talks and an impartial All-Union review of the Sumgait trials.
- June 12, the legislature of Nagorno-Karabakh unanimously votes to secede from Azerbaijan and to reunify with Soviet Armenia
- June 13: the Presidium of the Supreme Soviet of the Azerbaijan SSR refuses the request.
- June 14: A general strike occurs in Yerevan, closing all businesses and schools, in support of the Armenian legislature. A demonstration of 100,000 continues in Yerevan.
- June 15: Soviet Armenian Supreme Council votes in favor of the unification of NKAO.
- June 17: Soviet Azerbaijani Supreme Council opposes the transfer of NKAO to Armenia.
- June 28–29: Conference of the Communist Party of the Soviet Union disapproves Armenian claims to NKAO.
- July 5: A general strike is announced. Strikers demand the resolution of the Karabakh question and transfer of the trials of those involved in the Sumgait pogrom from Azerbaijan to the USSR Supreme Court. There is a clash at Zvartnots Airport, between the Soviet troops and protesters in Zvartnots Airport, leaving one man left dead, and tens injured.
- July 12–13: NKAO Soviet Council votes in favor of unification with Armenia.
- July 18: Soviet Supreme Council refuses Armenian claims.
- July 21: Paruyr Hayrikyan deported to Ethiopia.
- Autumn: Around 167,000 Azerbaijanis of Armenia start to leave in large numbers.
- September: State of emergency declared in Stepanakert after Armenian and Azerbaijanis clash.
- November: Kirovabad pogrom
- November 7: Hundreds of thousands demonstrate in Yerevan to support the Karabakh Committee.
- November 22: Soviet Armenian Supreme Council recognizes the Armenian Genocide.
- November 24: State of emergency declared in Yerevan.
- December 7: Armenian earthquake.
- December 10: Karabakh Committee members arrested, sent to Moscow.

=== 1989 ===
- March 16: Metsamor Nuclear Power Plant shut down.
- May 31: Karabakh Committee members freed.
- December 1: Soviet Armenian Supreme Council and NKAO Supreme Council declare the unification of the two entities

=== 1990 ===
- January 13–19: Pogrom of Armenians in Baku.
- May 20: 1990 Armenian parliamentary election, pro-independence members form majority.
- August 4: Levon Ter-Petrosyan elected chairman of the Supreme Council, de facto leader of Armenia.
- August 23: Soviet Armenian Supreme Council declared independence.

=== 1991 ===
- April 30 – May 15: First Nagorno-Karabakh War: Soviet and Azeri forces deport thousands of Armenians from Shahumyan during Operation Ring.
- August 19–21: 1991 Soviet coup d'état attempt
- September 2: Nagorno-Karabakh Republic proclaimed in Stepanakert through a popular independence referendum.

== Bibliography ==
- Chorbajian, Levon; Mutafian, Claude; Donabedian, Patrick (1994). The Caucasian Knot: The History and Geopolitics of Nagorno-Karabagh. Zed Books. ISBN 978-1-85649-288-1.
- Libaridian, Gerard (1988). The Karabagh File: Documents and Facts on the Region of Mountainous Karabagh, 1918–1988 (PDF). New York: Zoryan Institute for Contemporary Armenian Research & Documentation. ISBN 0-916431-26-6. Archived from the original (PDF) on 15 December 2020.
- Malkasian, Mark (1996). Gha-ra-bagh!: The Emergence of the National Democratic Movement in Armenia. Detroit: Wayne State University Press. ISBN 0-8143-2605-6.
- Saparov, Arsène (2014). From Conflict to Autonomy in the Caucasus: The Soviet Union and the Making of Abkhazia, South Ossetia and Nagorno Karabakh. Routledge. doi:10.4324/9781315758992. ISBN 978-1-315-75899-2.
- Suny, Ronald Grigor (1993). Looking toward Ararat: Armenia in Modern History. Bloomington: Indiana University Press. ISBN 978-0-253-20773-9.
- Verluise, Pierre (1995). Armenia in Crisis: The 1988 Earthquake. Detroit: Wayne State University Press. ISBN 9780814325278.
- Waal, Thomas de (2004). Black garden: Armenia and Azerbaijan through peace and war. New York: New York University Press. p. 42. ISBN 9780814719459.
