= Genrikh Poghosyan =

Soviet Armenian politician (1931–2000)

Genrikh Poghosyan Հենրիկ Պողոսյան

First Secretary of the Nagorno-Karabakh Autonomous Oblast Committee of the Communist Party of Azerbaijan
- In office 24 February 1988 – 20 January 1989
- Preceded by: Boris Kevorkov
- Succeeded by: Vagan Gabrielyan

Personal details
- Born: Genrikh Andreyevich Poghosyan; 1931 Stepanakert, Nagorno-Karabakh Autonomous Oblast, USSR
- Died: 2000 (aged 68–69) Moscow, Russia

Genrikh Andreyi Poghosyan (Armenian: Հենրիկ Անդրեյի Պողոսյան) was the First Secretary of the Nagorno-Karabakh Autonomous Oblast Committee of the Communist Party of Azerbaijan. He was appointed in February 1988, succeeding Boris Kevorkov.

== Biography ==
Poghosyan was the Second Secretary of the Nagorno-Karabakh Autonomous Oblast Committee of the Communist Party of Azerbaijan up until 1988. Secretary Boris Kevorkov was very loyal to Azerbaijani leaders in Baku, and was resented by the Armenian community.

During the Karabakh movement, 87 Armenian deputies from the Regional Soviet called an emergency session of the assembly on 20 February 1988 in response to Armenian demonstrations in Stepanakert calling for the unification of Karabakh and Armenia. Kevorkov had tried and failed to stop the session's taking place, and when 110 Armenian deputies voted unanimously for the resolution, calling for Nagorny Karabakh to join Soviet Armenia, tried to swipe the stamp needed to confirm the resolution. Kevorkov was removed from office by Moscow emissaries and succeeded by Poghosyan on 24 February 1988.

Poghosyan was much more popular among Karabakh Armenians. A few months later he began to support the campaign for unification with Armenia. Poghosyan held his position until January 1989.

== Bibliography ==
- Malkasian, Mark (1996), Gha-ra-bagh!, Wayne State University Press, ISBN 0-8143-2604-8
- de Waal, Thomas (2003). Black Garden: Armenia and Azerbaijan Through Peace and War. New York: New York University Press. ISBN 9780814719459.
- Kaufman, Stuart J. (2001), Modern Hatreds: The Symbolic Politics of Ethnic War, Cornell University Press, ISBN 0-8014-8736-6
