= Victory Monument =

Victory Monument may refer to the following structures:

- Bolzano Victory Monument in Italy
- Bukgwan Victory Monument in North Korea
- Victory Monument (Bangkok) in Thailand
- Victory Monument (Chicago) in the United States of America
- Victory Monument (Tolyatti) in Russia
- Victory Monument (Riga) in Latvia
- Victory Monument (Khankendi) in Azerbaijan
- Victory Monument (Ankara) in Turkey

== See also ==
- Triumphal arch
- Victory column
- Category:Victory monuments
