= Zori Balayan =

Armenian writer (1935–2026)

Zori Balayan Զորի Բալայան
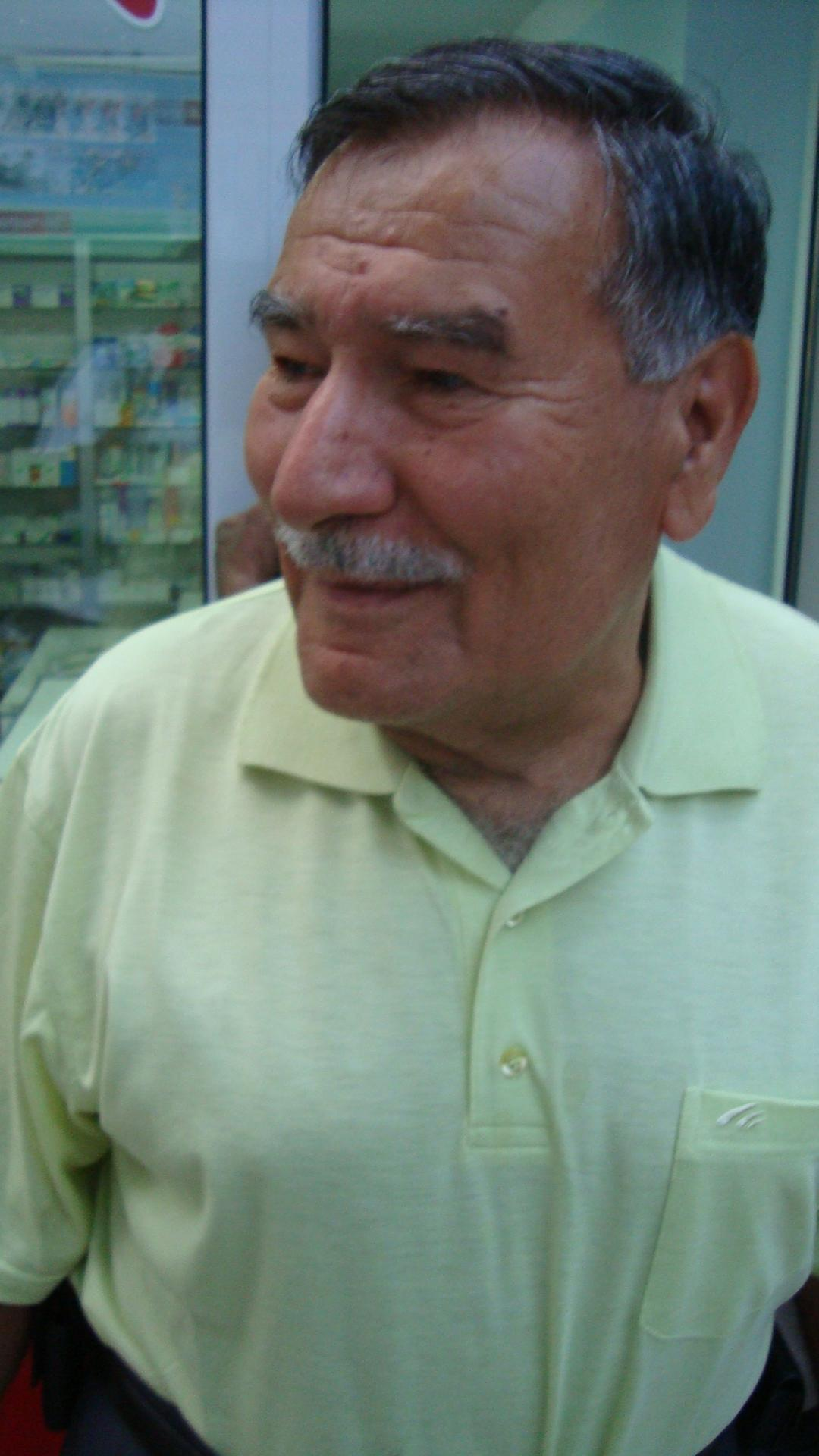
- Balayan in 2010
- Born: February 10, 1935; Stepanakert, Nagorno-Karabakh Autonomous Oblast, Azerbaijan SSR, Transcaucasian SFSR, Soviet Union
- Died: April 5, 2026 (aged 91)
- Occupations: Author; novelist; journalist; sports doctor; traveler
Zori Balayan
- Writing career
- Period: 1971–2026

Zori Hayki Balayan (Armenian: Զորի Հայկի Բալայան, February 10, 1935 – April 5, 2026) was an Armenian novelist, journalist, sports doctor, traveler, and sports expert. He was awarded the "Renowned master of the Arts" an Armenian official title.

== Life and career ==
Balayan was born in Stepanakert, Nagorno-Karabakh Autonomous Oblast (Azerbaijan SSR) on February 10, 1935. He graduated from the Ryazan State Medical University in 1963. From 1971 to 1973, he traversed the Kamchatka and Chokotskaya tundras on dog-sleds, traveling as far as the North Sea. In his essay "Hearth," published during the pre-perestroika era, he tried to demonstrate the Armenian identity of Nagorno-Karabakh and identified Nakhichevan as historically belonging to Armenia. He further regarded the Turks (including Azerbaijanis) as an enemy of both Russia and Armenia. Azerbaijani historian Isa Gambar criticized Balayan's book in an article entitled Old Songs and New Legends. Azerbaijan destroyed even the remains of native Armenian ruins in Nakhchivan such as Armenian cemetery in Julfa.

In 1988, he and Armenian poet Silva Kaputikyan were received by Mikhail Gorbachev and discussed the absence of Armenian-language television programs and textbooks in Nagorno-Karabakh schools as well as other concerns of Karabakh's majority-Armenian population.

In October 1993, he signed the Letter of Forty-Two.

Balayan was a journalist for the weekly Russian-language publication Literaturnaya Gazeta.

Balayan died on April 5, 2026, at the age of 91.

== Book forgery ==
Sometime after the end of the First Nagorno-Karabakh War, a number of Azerbaijani and Turkish sources began to quote a passage from a book supposedly written by Balayan titled Revival of Our Souls (sometimes given as Revival of Our Spirits as well), wherein he confesses to brutally murdering an Azerbaijani child during the war. Balayan, as well as the Ministry of Foreign Affairs of Armenia, have come out to deny him having ever written such a book. Ayşe Günaysu, a member of the Committee Against Racism and Discrimination of the Human Rights Association of Turkey (Istanbul branch), stated that "it should be quite obvious, from the language used in depicting the torture, that the quotation was wholly made up." Onur Caymaz, a Turkish writer, who originally backed the allegation, stated that he was wrong and that Balayan never wrote such a book.

== Interpol refusing the arrest warrant ==
Azerbaijani authorities allege that Balayan was involved in a terrorist bombing of the metro in Baku in 1994. In a letter to Balayan, the general secretary of Interpol, however, stated that the agency considered the complaint politically motivated and that it had removed Balayan from its wanted list as a result.

== Critics in Armenia ==
Balayan's views on the annexation of Crimea by Russia and alleged lobbying activities were criticized by some Armenian politicians, including Igor Muradyan and Levon Ter-Petrosian. Balayan's letter to Putin, in which he implies that both Armenia and Karabakh are Russian soil, met harsh criticism in Armenia in 2013.

== Books ==
- My Cilicia, (Russian), Yerevan, 2004
- Zim Kilikia (Armenian: Զիմ Կիլիկիա), Yerevan 2005
- Cilicia (Armenian: Կիլիկիա), vols. 2 and 3, Yerevan 2006–2007
- Chasm, (Armenian and Russian), Yerevan, 2004
- Heaven and Hell (Armenian, Russian and English) Los Angeles, 1997, Yerevan, 1995
- Hearth, Moscow 1984, Yerevan 1981
- Between Two Fires, Yerevan 1979
- Blue roads, Yerevan 1975
- Required Man's opinion, (Russian) Yerevan 1974
