= Kirovabad (disambiguation) =

Kirovabad can refer to:

- The former name of Ganja, the second largest city in Azerbaijan.
- The former name of Panj or Pyandzh a city in Tajikistan.
- Kirovabad pogrom - pogrom in Kirovabad formerly Ganja.
