= Igor Muradyan =

Armenian political activist and politologist

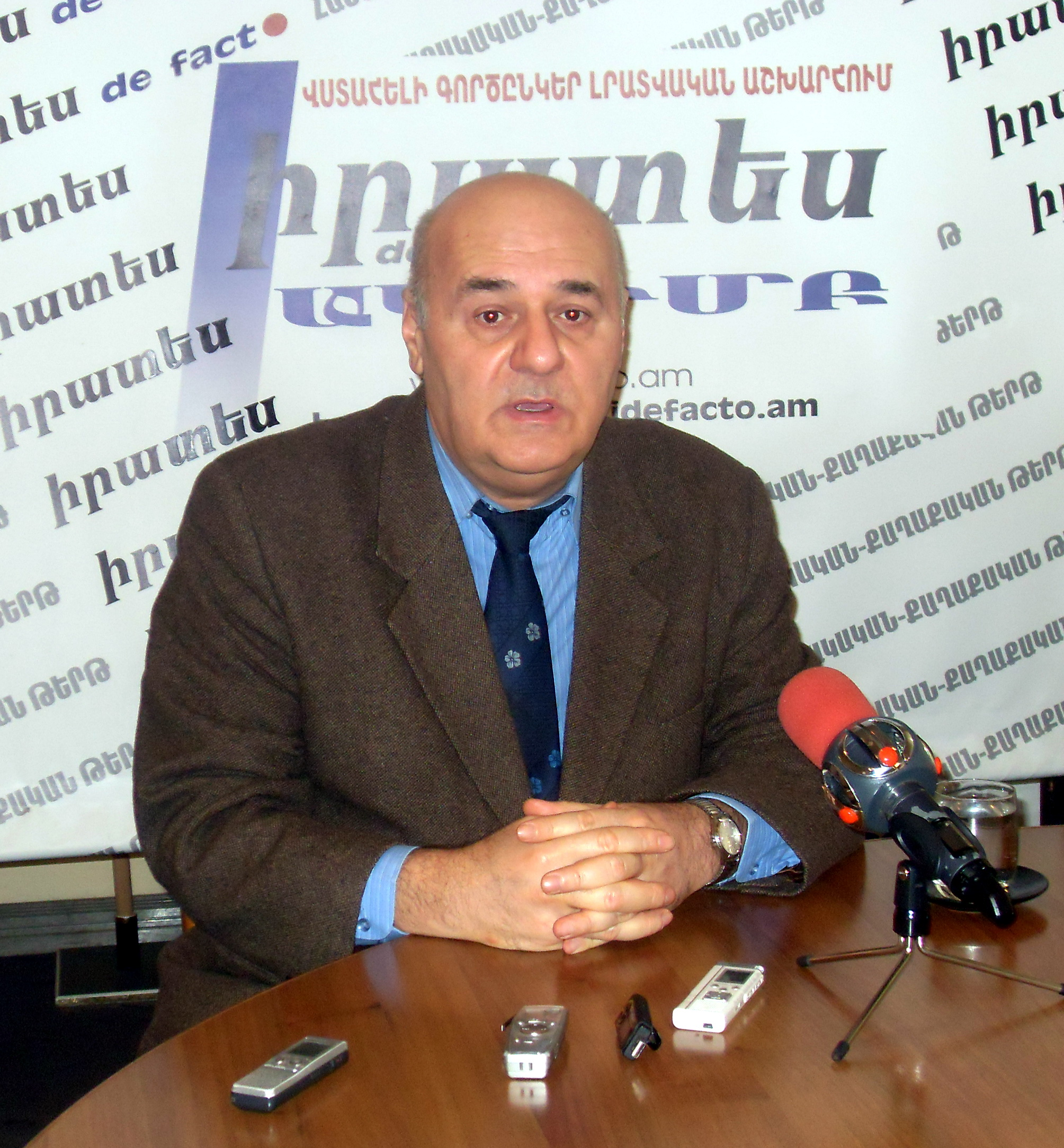
Muradyan in 2013

Igor Muradyan (Armenian: Իգոր Մուրադյան; 29 April 1957 – 17 June 2018) was an Armenian political activist and political scientist. He was one of the earliest leaders of the Karabakh movement, along with Zori Balayan, Silva Kaputikyan and Viktor Hambardzumyan.

== Biography ==
Born in Odessa, Muradyan grew up in Baku, where many Armenians lived during the Soviet period. He finished the Plekhanov Institute of National Economy in Moscow. According to Thomas de Waal, "Muradian was a Soviet insider. He worked as an economist in the state planning agency Gosplan in Yerevan and had good connections among Party cadres."

Muradyan was later critical of the Nagorno-Karabakh authorities, calling the unrecognised Nagorno-Karabakh Republic "a failed experiment" and criticising its authorities for not being able to come up with a clear strategy for its existence and arguing for Nagorno-Karabakh's incorporation into Armenia.
