= Kamran Baghirov =

Soviet politician (1933–2000)

- Kamran Bağırov

First Secretary of the Central Committee of the Azerbaijan Communist Party
- In office 3 December 1982 – 21 May 1988
- Preceded by: Heydar Aliyev
- Succeeded by: Abdurrahman Vazirov

Personal details
- Born: 24 January 1933 Shusha, Azerbaijan SSR, USSR
- Died: 25 October 2000 (aged 67) Baku, Azerbaijan
- Party: Communist Party of the Soviet Union
- Spouse: Tatyana Alekseyevna Baghirova
- Children: son Teymur

Kamran Baghirov Mammad oglu (Azerbaijani: Камран Бағыров Мәммәд оғлу, romanized: Kamran Bağırov Məmməd oğlu; 24 January 1933 – 25 October 2000), was the 12th First Secretary of Azerbaijan Communist Party.

== Biography ==
From 3 December 1982, through 21 May 1988, Baghirov served as the First Secretary of the Central Committee of the Communist Party of Azerbaijan SSR. After start and escalation of the Nagorno-Karabakh conflict, he was replaced by Abdurrahman Vazirov. Baghirov is often blamed for deterioration of the economy of Azerbaijan which was boosted when his predecessor Heydar Aliyev was in office. He was also blamed for widespread corruption. From February 1988 when the conflict around Nagorno-Karabakh Autonomous Oblast (NKAO) started, until his removal from office, Baghirov has been considered as an inactive leader who allowed exodus of ethnic Azerbaijanis from Armenia and Nagorno-Karabakh, and inability to prevent the escalation of the conflict. Baghirov was bashed for his passiveness in allowing the NKAO's party leader, Boris Kevorkov to be replaced by Armenian nationalist, Genrikh Poghosyan subsequently causing the direct rule of NKAO by Moscow

Party political offices
| Preceded by Heydar Aliyev | First Secretary of the Azerbaijan Communist Party; 1982–1988 | Succeeded by Abdurrahman Vazirov |
