= Baku pogrom =

1990 pogrom against Armenians in Azerbaijan SSR

- Part of the Nagorno-Karabakh conflict, the First Nagorno-Karabakh War and the dissolution of the Soviet Union
- Location: Baku, Azerbaijani SSR, Soviet Union
- Date: January 12–19, 1990
- Target: Local Armenian population
- Deaths: 48 (Human Rights Watch); 90 (Thomas de Waal); 100+ (Aleksan Hakobyan)
- Injuries: 700
- Perpetrator: Azerbaijanis

From January 12, 1990, a seven-day pogrom broke out against the Armenian civilian population in Baku, during which Armenians were beaten, murdered, and expelled from the city by Azerbaijanis. There were also many raids on apartments, robberies and arsons. According to the Human Rights Watch reporter Robert Kushen, "the action was not entirely (or perhaps not at all) spontaneous, as the attackers had lists of Armenians and their addresses". The pogrom of Armenians in Baku was one of the acts of ethnic violence in the context of the First Nagorno-Karabakh War, directed against the demands of the Nagorno-Karabakh Armenians to secede from Azerbaijan and unify with Armenia.

== History ==
The pogrom of Armenians in Baku was not a spontaneous and one-time event but was one among series of ethnic violence employed by the Azerbaijanis against the Armenian population during the First Nagorno-Karabakh War. In 1988 the Armenians of Nagorno-Karabakh, which composed 3/4 of population of the Oblast, started voicing their demands for the unification of the enclave with Armenia. On February 20, 1988, the Soviet of People's Deputies in Karabakh voted to request the transfer of the region to Armenia. This process took place in the light of the new economic and political policies, perestroika and glasnost, introduced by the new General Secretary of the Soviet Union Mikhail Gorbachev who had come to power on March 10, 1985. This unprecedented action by a regional Soviet brought out tens of thousands of demonstrations both in Stepanakert and Yerevan, but Moscow rejected the Armenians' demands labelling them as "nationalists" and "extremists". On the following day demonstrations were held by Azerbaijanis in Baku and other cities of Azerbaijan against the unification of Karabakh with Armenia, during which strong anti-Armenian sentiments were voiced, the common slogans were: 'Death to Armenians', 'Armenians out of Azerbaijan'.

On February 27, 1988, a massive pogrom was carried out in Sumgait during which the Armenian population of the city was brutally slaughtered and expelled. The Sumgait pogrom was followed by another pogrom against Armenians in 1988 in Kirovabad (today's Ganja), the second largest city of Azerbaijan from where all the Armenians were expelled. In spring and summer 1988 the ethnic tensions were escalating between the Armenians and the Azerbaijanis. After the Sumgait tragedy a massive migration of Armenians from Azerbaijan and Azerbaijanis from Armenia began. By 1989 the Armenians stayed only in those places where they had a well-established community, including in Baku. By the beginning of 1990 there were only about 30–40 thousand Armenians left in Baku, mostly women and pensioners. Similarly, by the end of 1988, dozens of villages in Armenia had become deserted, as most of Armenia's more than 200,000 Azerbaijanis and Muslim Kurds left.

In December 1989 The Supreme Soviets of the Armenian SSR and Nagorno-Karabakh passed a resolution on the formal unification of Nagorno-Karabakh with Armenia, in accordance with the Soviet law on the people's right to self-determination. The pogrom of Armenians in Baku took place shortly afterwards and according to a number of sources it was a direct response to this resolution.

== The pogrom ==
By January 1990, Azerbaijan was in turmoil. Large rallies by the Azerbaijani Popular Front took place in Baku. On January 12 a mass rally took place in the city's Lenin Square, during which the radical nationalists of Azerbaijan's anti-communist Popular Front were calling people for the defense of Azerbaijan's sovereignty from the demands of the Armenians. At the same time groups of young Azerbaijanis were roaming the streets, terrorizing Armenian citizens and warning them to leave the town.

The rhetoric of some Popular Front leaders, which included calls for the deportation of Armenians from Azerbaijan, was at least harmful to the relations with the Armenian population; that rhetoric was not significantly toned down during the pogroms.

Thomas de Waal has called this pogrom the first part of "Black January" a tragedy with about 90 Armenian victims. According to him, at first a large crowd gathered in the Lenin Square of Baku, and at nightfall different groups separated from the Azerbaijani Popular Front demonstrators, and started to attack Armenians. As in Sumgait, their activities were distinguished by extreme cruelty: the area around the Armenian quarter became an arena of mass killings. During the "pogroms in Baku, Armenian homes were set on fire and looted while many Armenians were killed or injured". Kirill Stolyarov in his book "Break-up" describes beatings of the elderly, expelling them from their homes, burning people alive and other cases of savagery. Soyuz weekly on May 19, 1990, reported "... in the course of Armenian pogroms in Baku raging crowd literally tore a man apart, and his remains were thrown into a garbage bin". Aleksei Vasiliev, an Azerbaijani soldier of the Soviet army testified seeing a naked woman being thrown out of the window into the fire in which her furniture was burning.

The events in Baku were reflected in a report by the Armenian state party in the UN Committee in elimination of discrimination against women, July 27, 1997:

For five days in January of 1990, the Armenian community of Baku, the capital of Azerbaijan, were killed, tortured, robbed and humiliated. Pregnant women and babies were molested, little girls were raped in front of their parents' eyes, Christian crosses were burned on their backs, and they were abused for their Christian faith.

Bill Keller, who was in Baku after the events, in his report for The New York Times wrote:

Here and there, boarded windows or soot-blackened walls mark an apartment where Armenians were driven out by mobs and their belongings set afire on the balcony. The Armenian Orthodox Church, whose congregation has been depleted over the past two years by an emigration based on fear, is now a charred ruin. A neighbor said firefighters and the police watched without intervening as vandals destroyed the building at the beginning of the year.

On January 15 Radio Liberty reported: "Raging crowds killed at least 25 people at night of 14 in the Armenian district of Baku – the capital of Soviet republic of Azerbaijan. According to the preliminary information, the death toll reaches 25."

On January 15, 1990, the Izvestiya newspaper reported that a total of 33 people died in clashes over the past three days. Three days later, it tallied 66 deaths, 220 injured, and 210 recorded incidents of mob violence and arson, with 45 of such incidents happening on January 17 alone.

Another article published in The New York Times on January 19, 1990, said:

Azerbaijan is no Lithuania... Nationalists in Lithuania are struggling to wrest independence from Moscow by nonviolent, political means. Nationalists in Azerbaijan also talk of independence, but their protest includes bloody pogroms against their Armenian neighbors.

One of the leaders of the National Front of Azerbaijan Etibar Mammadov himself testified of the cruelties and of no official intervention:

"I myself witnessed the murder of two Armenians near the railway station. A crowd gathered, threw petrol on them and burned them, whereas the regional militia division was only 200 meters away with some 400–500 soldiers of the internal forces. The soldiers passed by the burning bodies at a distance of some 20 meters, and nobody attempted to circle the area and dissolve the crowd."

Russian poet David Samoylov referring to Baku pogroms made a note in his diary on January 18, "The atrocities in Azerbaijan are shocking. The thoughts are only about that."

Thus the pogrom in Baku resulted in numerous human casualties; dozens of thousands of Armenians lost their houses and were deported from the country – this was acknowledged by the Chairman of the Soviet of the Union Yevgeny Primakov on the closed session of the Supreme Council of USSR on March 5, 1990. The victims of the pogrom were not only Armenians but also "the Jews, Ossetians, Georgians, and all others who resembled Armenians to a greater or lesser extent. They were beating in the face, not in the passport."

The pogrom lasted for about seven days during which Central authorities did little to stop the violence – no state of emergency was declared in Baku. The police did not respond to the calls of the victims. Several eyewitnesses told Helsinki Watch/Memorial that they "approached militiamen(police) on the street to report nearby attacks on Armenians, but the militiamen did nothing". Many testimonies confirm that the police deliberately did nothing to put an end to the pogrom and that everything was organised in advance as the pogrom makers knew exactly where the Armenian lived. Azaddin Gyulmamedov, a young Azerbaijani who attended the rally in Baku on the 13th and witnessed the outbreak of anti-Armenian violence, gave the following testimony:

We went to see what was happening. We saw these guys in the streets. I don't know who they were -drug addicts, maybe. They had sticks and clubs, and lists of Armenians and where they lived. They wanted to break down the doors of Armenian apartments and chase them out. The police didn't do anything. They just stood and watched. Same with the soldiers, who had weapons. We asked them to help. There were about a dozen soldiers and ten of us, and there were about twenty in the gang, but the soldiers wouldn't help. They said: 'You can do it yourself, Blackie. We're not getting involved."

== Eyewitness testimonies ==
The World Chess Champion Garry Kasparov, whose mother was Armenian, and his family were among the evacuees. As an eyewitness he later testified:

No one would halt the Armenian pogroms in Baku, although there were 11 thousand soldiers of internal troops in the city. No one would intervene until the ethnic cleansing was carried out. The pogroms were happening not in a random place but in the huge capital city with blocks of flats. In such a megapolis as Baku the crowd simply cannot carry out targeted operations like that. When the pogrom-makers go purposefully from one district to another, from one apartment to another this means that they had been given the addresses and that they had a coordinator.

Kasparov later wrote that it was "coordinated by local leaders with Soviet acquiescence."

Baku massacre survivor Emma Bagdasarova (currently US citizen) gave the following account:

When the beatings began, my cousin was beaten on a tram. They tied his both hands to the railings and began to beat. When he called us, we came home, he was half dead... He was all bandaged. The police did nothing, as I knew they were even helping with the beating... Soon we got a call and were told that they would come to kill us at night.

In the words of another survivor Roald Reshetnikov:

The train was stopped for a long time, and those from the National Front used to throw out things all around... they seized the bags from the Armenians, opened suitcases, spread things on the platform. Children were crying, some were with the blood on their faces, things were all around the platform... And when I walked a little bit further along the platform suddenly I heard a wild scream. Then I was told, as I hadn't seen it myself, there was a woman literally ripped in half...

== Aftermath ==
On January 20, 1990, after the Armenian population was already expelled from the city, the Soviet troops intervened in Baku and a state of martial law was declared. This however did not accomplish its officially stated goal of quelling the violence as most Armenians fled Baku. By the end of April 1993, it was estimated that only 18–20,000 Armenians remained in Baku, mostly in hiding.

National Deputy of the USSR, Nikolai Petrushenko, voiced his concern of indifference or collusion by the Azeri government, as did Vadim Bakatin, the Minister of Internal Affairs of the USSR The authorities thus not only failed to stem the anti-Armenian attacks, but also raised serious doubts about whether the Soviets wished to stem the violence at all or merely to hold the power in Baku.

A Moscow News article dated February 4, 1990 reported:

Unlike Sumgait, the Soviet army was late in Baku not for 3 hours, but for a whole week. Moreover, to stop the pogroms it was enough to let in the forces of Baku army garrison and the internal troops. The troops entered the town seized with pogroms not to stop them, but to prevent the final seizure of power by the People's Front of Azerbaijan, which was planned for January 20.

Leila Yunusova, a member of the National Front of Azerbaijan, said that these acts were supported by the state authorities "since they were in favour of the ideas of the right wing of the National Front. The authorities of the Republic closed their eyes also on the intentions of Azerbaijani right wing to escalate the confrontation with Armenia... the arson of the Armenian church with no police intervention was one of the examples of this policy.

The pogrom in Baku was in many ways compared to the pogrom in Sumgait in 1988. That the perpetrators of the Sumgait pogrom did not receive due punishment and that the actual information about the pogrom was censored and hidden from the public, largely contributed to the repetition of analogous events in Baku in 1990. The ways and means employed against the Armenians in Baku were also similar to those employed in Sumgait.

The newspaper Novaya Zhizn at the time of the pogroms reported, "The number of Armenians killed in Baku has already surpassed that of Sumgait; this new tragedy was the direct consequence of the authorities trying to silence the first one."

In 1990, an "Open Letter on Anti-Armenian Pogroms in the Soviet Union" was initiated by the Helsinki Treaty Watchdog Committee of France and intellectuals from the College International de Philosophie, Paris:

As recently as January 1990, the pogroms continued in Baku and other parts of Azerbaijan. The mere fact that these pogroms were repeated and the fact that they followed the same pattern lead us to think that these tragic events are not accidents or spontaneous outbursts.

The European Parliament (July 1988, par. 1, C) passed a resolution which "condemn[ed] the violence employed against Armenian demonstrators in Azerbaijan" and announced:

[T]he deteriorating political situation, which has led to anti-Armenian pogroms in Sumgait and serious acts of violence in Baku, is in itself a threat to the safety of the Armenians living in Azerbaijan.

Non-official sources estimate that the number Armenians living on Azerbaijani territory outside Nagorno-Karabakh is around 2,000 to 3,000, and almost exclusively comprises persons married to Azeris or of mixed Armenian-Azeri descent. The number of Armenians who are likely not married to Azeris and are not of mixed Armenian-Azeri descent are estimated at 645 (36 men and 609 women) and more than half (378 or 59 per cent of Armenians in Azerbaijan outside Nagorno-Karabakh) live in Baku and the rest in rural areas. They are likely to be the elderly and sick, and probably have no other family members.

== Publications ==
- «Pogrom» / Washington Post, Washington, D.C. (January 21, 1990)
- Yurchenko, Boris, "A crowd of Armenians and Russians who fled violence in the Azerbaijani capital of Baku register Thursday for relief at an emergency center in Moscow," Free Press, Detroit (January 26, 1990)
- Whitney, Craig R., "When empires fall, not everyone ends up with a state of his own," New York Times National (April 14, 1991)
- А. Головков, Проникающее ранение / Огонёк, 6, 1990
- Human Rights Watch. "Playing the "Communal Card": Communal Violence and Human Rights"
- "Conflict in the Soviet Union: Black January in Azerbaidzhan", by Robert Kushen, 1991, Human Rights Watch, ISBN 1-56432-027-8
- JTA, "Jews among Azerbaijani casualties," Washington Jewish Week, Washington, D.C. (January 18, 1990)
- Feldmenn, Linda, "Soviet Rein in Azeri Nationalists," Christian Science Monitor (January 29, 1990)
- The New York Times. "Nationalism at Its Nastiest". January 19, 1990
- Astvatsaturian Turcotte, Anna (2012). Nowhere, a Story of Exile. hybooksonline.com. ISBN 978-09857864-1-0.

== See also ==
- Sumgait pogrom (February 1988)
- Kirovabad pogrom (November 1988)
- Maraga Massacre (April 1992)
- List of massacres in Azerbaijan
- Armenians in Azerbaijan
