= Zvartnots Airport clash =

First Nagorno-Karabakh War

- Part of the Karabakh movement
- Date: 5 July 1988
- Location: Zvartnots Airport, Armenia, Soviet Union

Parties
Armenian protesters	Soviet Army

Casualties
- Death: 1
- Injuries: 36–50

The Zvartnots Airport clash occurred on 5 July 1988 between Armenian protesters and the Soviet troops at the Zvartnots International Airport at the outskirts of Yerevan.

After the Communist Party of the Soviet Union's conference in late June disapproved the Armenian demands to Nagorno-Karabakh, a new wave of demonstrations erupted in Yerevan. The Soviet government sent troops to Yerevan to "restore order." Thousands of Armenian protesters gathered at the Zvartnots Airport to block the entrance of the Soviet troops. A clash occurred between the troops and the demonstrators. The security forces opened fire killing one person and injuring dozens. The event spread some anti-Soviet sentiment in Armenia.
