= Stepanakert Memorial =

Monument in Nagorno-Karabakh

Stepanakert Memorial / Victory Monument
- Qələbə abidəsi (Azerbaijani) Ստեփանակերտի հուշարձան (Armenian)
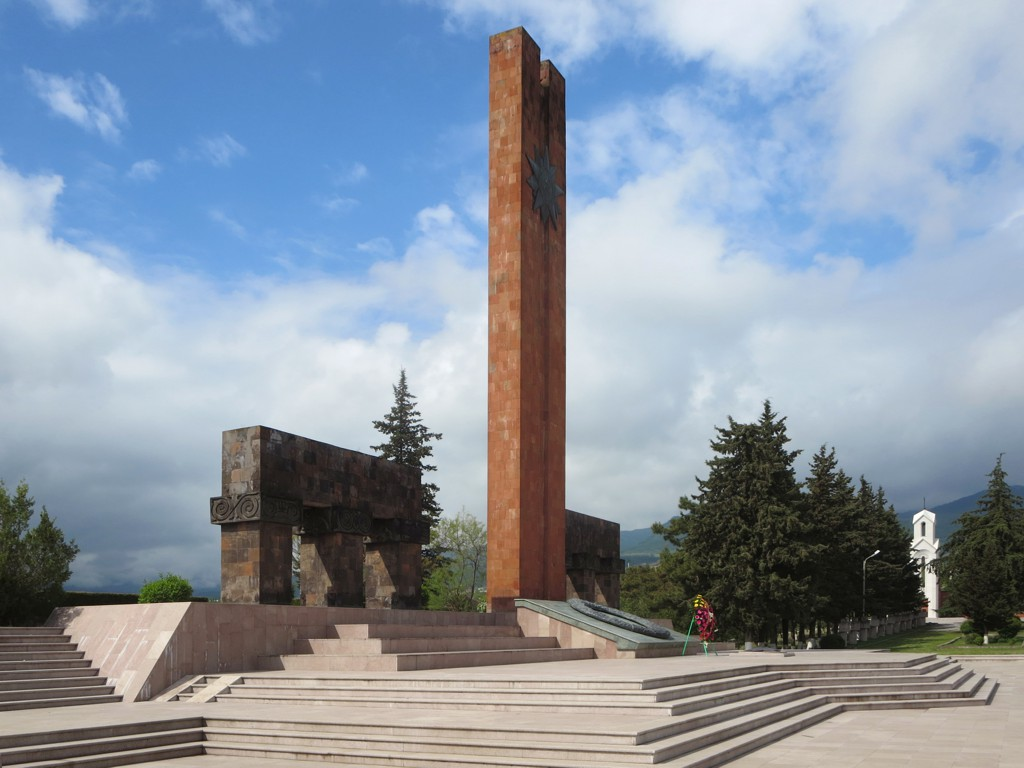
- The monument

- Location within Azerbaijan Location within Karabakh Economic Region
- Location: Stepanakert/Khankendi, Azerbaijan
- Coordinates: 39°48′41″N 46°45′44″E
- Created: 1945
- Operator: Azerbaijan SSR (1945–1991); Republic of Artsakh (1991–2024); Azerbaijan (2024–present)
- Status: All year

The Khankendi Memorial (Armenian: Ստեփանակերտի հուշարձան), or Victory Monument (Azerbaijani: Qələbə abidəsi), is a memorial located in Stepanakert (Khankendi), Azerbaijan in the disputed Nagorno-Karabakh region. It was built to commemorate 22,000 inhabitants of the Nagorno-Karabakh Autonomous Oblast that were killed in the Second World War and placed into a nearby mass grave.

== History ==
The memorial complex, built in honor of the 22,000 inhabitants of the Nagorno-Karabakh Autonomous Oblast of the Azerbaijan SSR who died during World War II, is centered around a 21-meter-high (69 ft) obelisk in the center. Those who died were entombed in the common grave formed on the opposite hill. Another part of the complex is a cascade pool with a fountain and seven ‘weeping’ springs constructed in the style of traditional Armenian monuments and classic ornamental art. On the granite pedestals are portraits of Armenian-Soviet soldiers of the Red Army who were honored as Heroes of the Soviet Union. The newest part of the complex is a cemetery where the Armenian military casualties of the First Nagorno-Karabakh War are buried. From 1945 to 1990, the memorial was managed by the Nagorno-Karabakh Regional Committee of the Communist Party of Azerbaijan. From 1991 to 2023, it was owned by the government of the Republic of Artsakh.

In 2026, news reports emerged alleging that the monument to the Armenian Genocide had been destroyed. Satellite images were published that purported to show that the bell tower had been demolished. An image of the monument being demolished by construction equipment was confirmed as falsified by the Office of the Cultural Heritage Ombudsman as an image that had been altered by AI to add the demolition equipment and damage. In November 2016, the Prime Minister of Armenia visited the Memorial.

== Complex monuments and memorials ==
The following structures are in the complex:

- Victory Monument (also known as the Monument to the Unknown Soldier)
- Wall of Triumph
- Monument to the Victims of the Armenian genocide
- Monument to the Victims of the Sumgait Massacre (erected in 1988)
- Memorial to the Victims of the 1988 Armenian earthquake
- Memorial to the Chairman of the NKR Supreme Council Artur Mkrtchyan
- Mass Grave of Armenian Soldiers

== Gallery ==
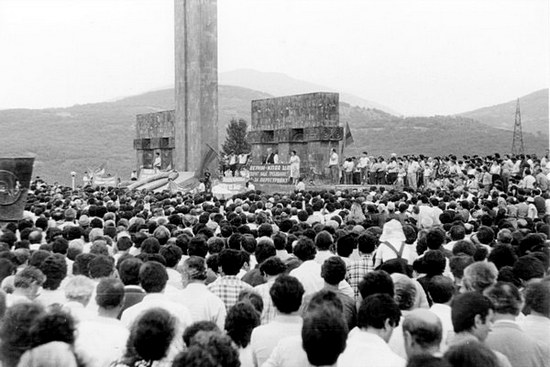
A protest at the memorial on February 20, 1988.

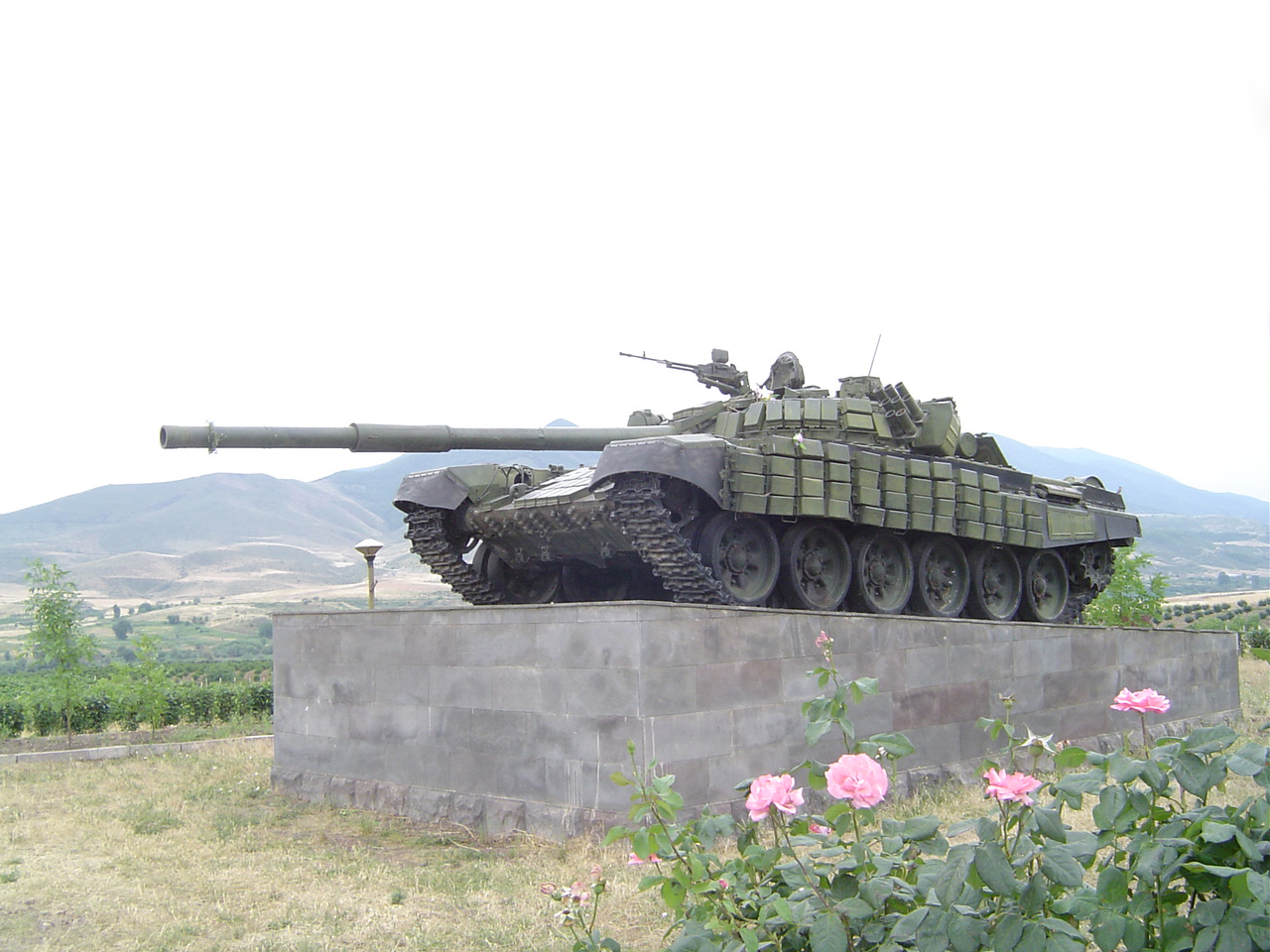

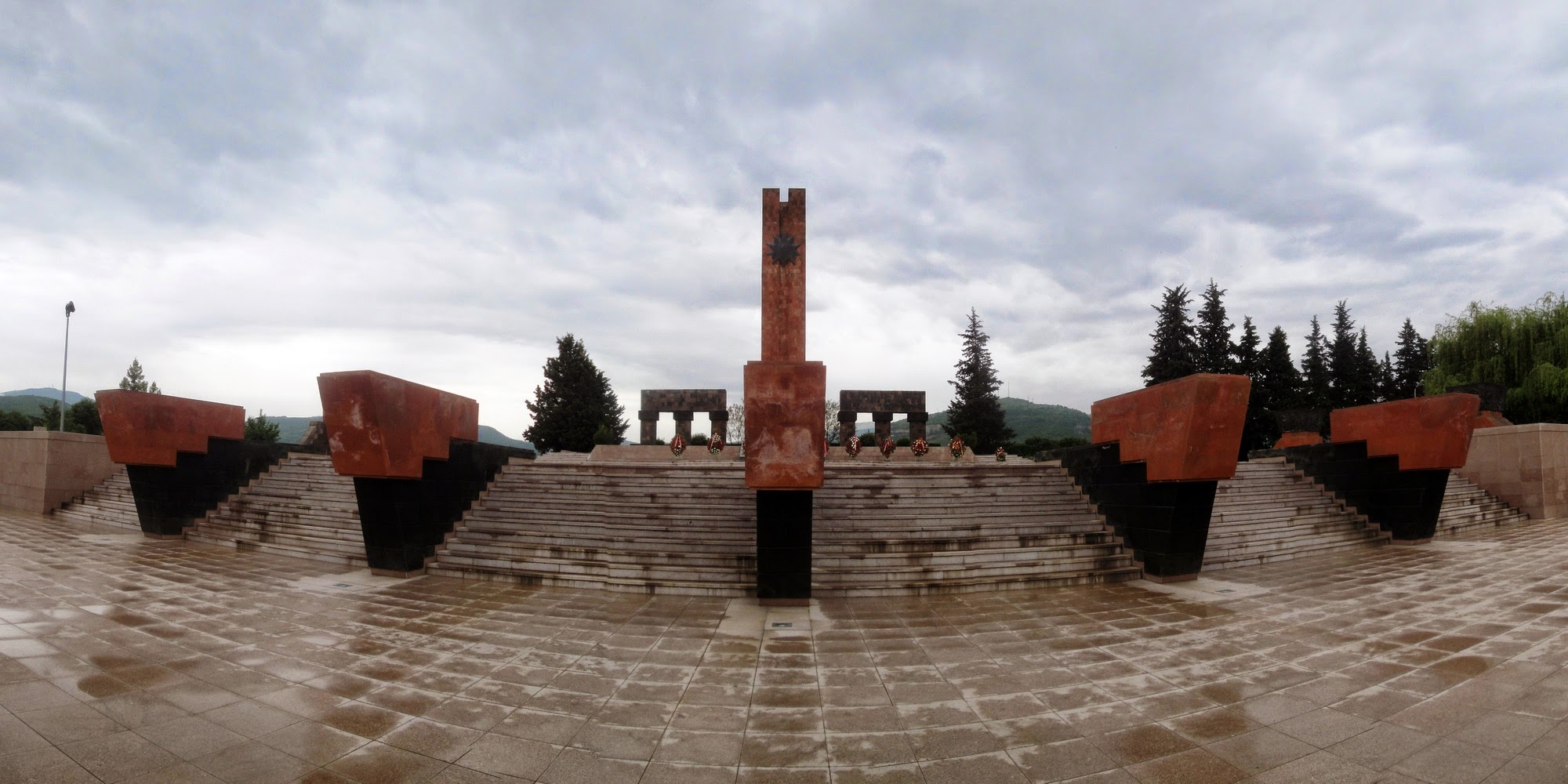

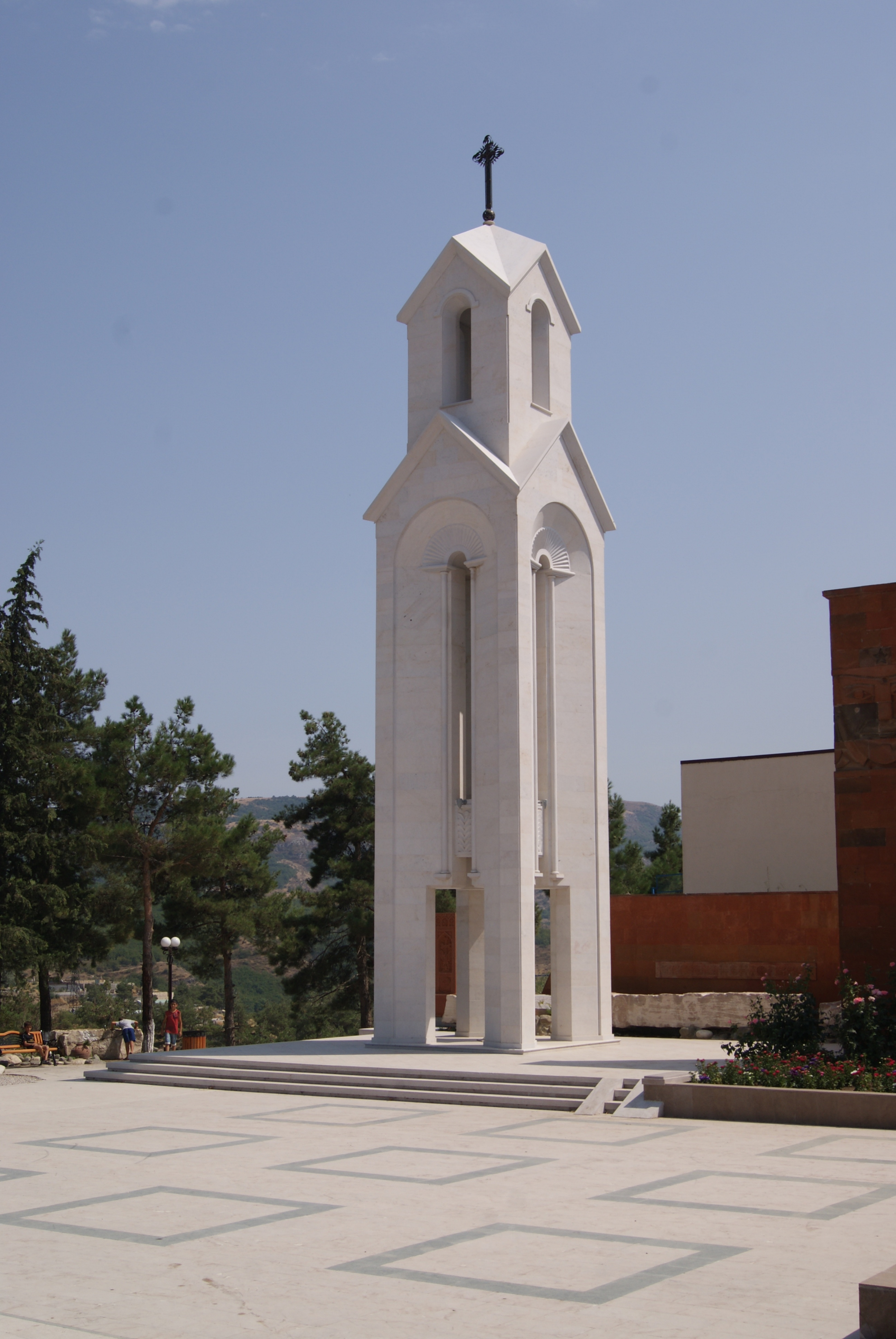
