= Abdurrahman Vazirov =

Azerbaijani politician (1930–2022)

- Əbdürrəhman Vəzirov

First Secretary of the Central Committee of the Azerbaijan Communist Party
- In office 21 May 1988 – 18 January 1990
- Preceded by: Kamran Baghirov
- Succeeded by: Ayaz Mutallibov

Personal details
- Born: 26 May 1930 Baku, Azerbaijan SSR, USSR
- Died: 10 January 2022 (aged 91) Moscow, Russia
- Party: Communist Party of the Soviet Union

Abdurrahman Khalil oglu Vazirov (Azerbaijani: Əbdürrəhman Xəlil oğlu Vəzirov; 26 May 1930 – 10 January 2022) was the 13th First Secretary of the Azerbaijan Communist Party and the leader of the Azerbaijan SSR from 1988 till January 1990.

Vazirov was appointed by the Kremlin to lead Soviet Azerbaijan in May 1988, amidst the escalation of the Nagorno-Karabakh conflict. Vazirov replaced Kamran Baghirov, whose dismissal came along with similar dismissal of Karen Demirchyan and appointment of Suren Harutyunyan as the leader of the Armenian SSR.

He was a Soviet diplomat, who served in India, Nepal and Pakistan. He had been out of the Azerbaijan SSR for over a decade and therefore was untainted by the corruption. He was neither a typical political boss nor a local nationalist. Despite his family’s origins in the Nagorno-Karabakh region of Azerbaijan, he did not speak Azerbaijani fluently.

Vazirov shared Mikhail Gorbachev's internationalist values and aspirations for political reform but he could not cope effectively with the complex political situation in Azerbaijan. He was also known as a fierce opponent of the former leader of Soviet Azerbaijan and later the 3rd president of independent Azerbaijan, Heydar Aliyev.

He left Azerbaijan SSR amidst the Black January events in Baku, for which he was later sought by the Parliament of Azerbaijan as one of the responsible parties. On 24 January 1990, he was replaced in his position by Ayaz Mutallibov.

Vazirov died on 10 January 2022, at the age of 91.

Party political offices
| Preceded by Kamran Baghirov | First Secretary of the Azerbaijan Communist Party; 1988–1990 | Succeeded by Ayaz Mutalibov |
