= Sumgait pogrom =

1988 anti-Armenian riots in Azerbaijan SSR

- Part of the Nagorno-Karabakh conflict, First Nagorno-Karabakh War and the dissolution of the Soviet Union
- Images from a videotape show burned cars and rioters in the streets of Sumgait.
- Location: 40°35′46″N 49°40′12″E; Sumgait, Azerbaijan, Soviet Union
- Date: February 27 – March 1, 1988
- Target: Local Armenian population
- Attack type: Murder, rape, riot
- Deaths: 32 (official Soviet data); 200+ (Armenian sources)
- Injuries: Unknown
- Perpetrator: Azerbaijani mobs

Ethnic Azerbaijanis carried out a pogrom against the Armenian population of the town of Sumgait, in the Azerbaijan Soviet Socialist Republic, in February 1988. The pogrom took place during the early stages of the Karabakh movement. On February 27, 1988, mobs of Azerbaijanis formed into groups and attacked and killed Armenians on the streets and in their apartments; widespread looting occurred, and a general lack of concern from police officers allowed the violence to continue for three days.

On February 28, a small contingent of Ministry of Internal Affairs (MVD) troops entered the city and unsuccessfully attempted to quell the rioting. More professional military units entered with tanks and armored personnel vehicles one day later. Government forces imposed a state of martial law and curfew and brought the crisis to an end. The official death toll released by the Prosecutor General of the USSR was 32 Armenians, although other estimates reach up into the hundreds of victims.

The violence in Sumgait was unexpected and was widely covered in the Western media. It was greeted with general surprise in Armenia and the rest of the Soviet Union because the Soviet government had largely suppressed ethnic conflicts in the country and had promoted policies such as fraternity of peoples, socialist patriotism, and proletarian internationalism to avert such conflicts. The policies of glasnost and perestroika, introduced by Soviet leader Mikhail Gorbachev in 1987, had decreased suppression of the population, which had the unintended consequences of allowing ethnic conflicts and ethnic nationalism to increase in the Soviet Union. The massacre, together with the Nagorno-Karabakh conflict, presented a major challenge to Gorbachev, and he was later criticized for his slow response to the crisis.

Because of the scale of atrocities against the Armenians as an ethnic group, the pogrom was immediately linked to the Armenian genocide of 1915 in the Armenian national consciousness. Russian political writer Roy Medvedev and USSR Journalists' Union described the events as genocide of the Armenian population. The Sumgait pogrom is commemorated every year on February 28 in Armenia, Nagorno-Karabakh (before the flight of its Armenian population), and among the Armenian diaspora.

== Background ==
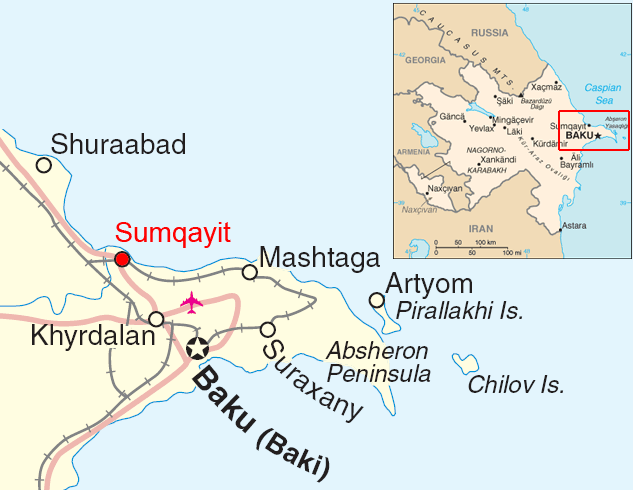
Sumgait (Sumqayit) is located approximately 30 kilometres (19 miles) northwest of Azerbaijan's capital Baku, near the Caspian Sea.

The city of Sumgait is located near the coast of the Caspian Sea, 30 kilometres (19 mi) north of the capital Baku. It had been renovated in the 1960s and had become a leading industrial city, second after Baku by its industrial importance, with oil refineries and petrochemical plants built during that era. Its population in the 1960s stood at 60,000, but by the late 1980s it had grown to over 223,000 (with an Armenian population of about 17,000), and overcrowding among other social problems plagued the city. While there was a high rate of unemployment and poverty among the Azerbaijani residents, the Armenians comprised mainly the working and educated sector of the town's population.

The political and economic reforms that General Secretary Gorbachev had initiated in 1985 saw a marked decentralization of Soviet authority. Armenians, in both Armenia proper and Nagorno-Karabakh, viewed Gorbachev's reform program as an opportunity to unite the two entities together. On February 20, 1988, tens of thousands of Armenians gathered to demonstrate in Stepanakert's Lenin (now Renaissance) Square to demand that the region be joined to Armenia. On the same day, the Supreme Soviet of Nagorno-Karabakh voted to join the Armenian SSR, a move staunchly opposed by the Soviet Azerbaijani authorities. Gorbachev rejected these claims, invoking Article 78 of the Soviet Constitution, which stated that republics' borders could not be altered without their prior consent. The vote by the council and the subsequent protests were condemned also by the state-run Soviet media; however, they resonated more loudly among Azerbaijanis. As journalist Thomas de Waal wrote in his 2003 book on the conflict, after the appeal of the council "the slow descent into armed conflict began on the first day."

=== Rallies and fuelling of anti-Armenian sentiments ===
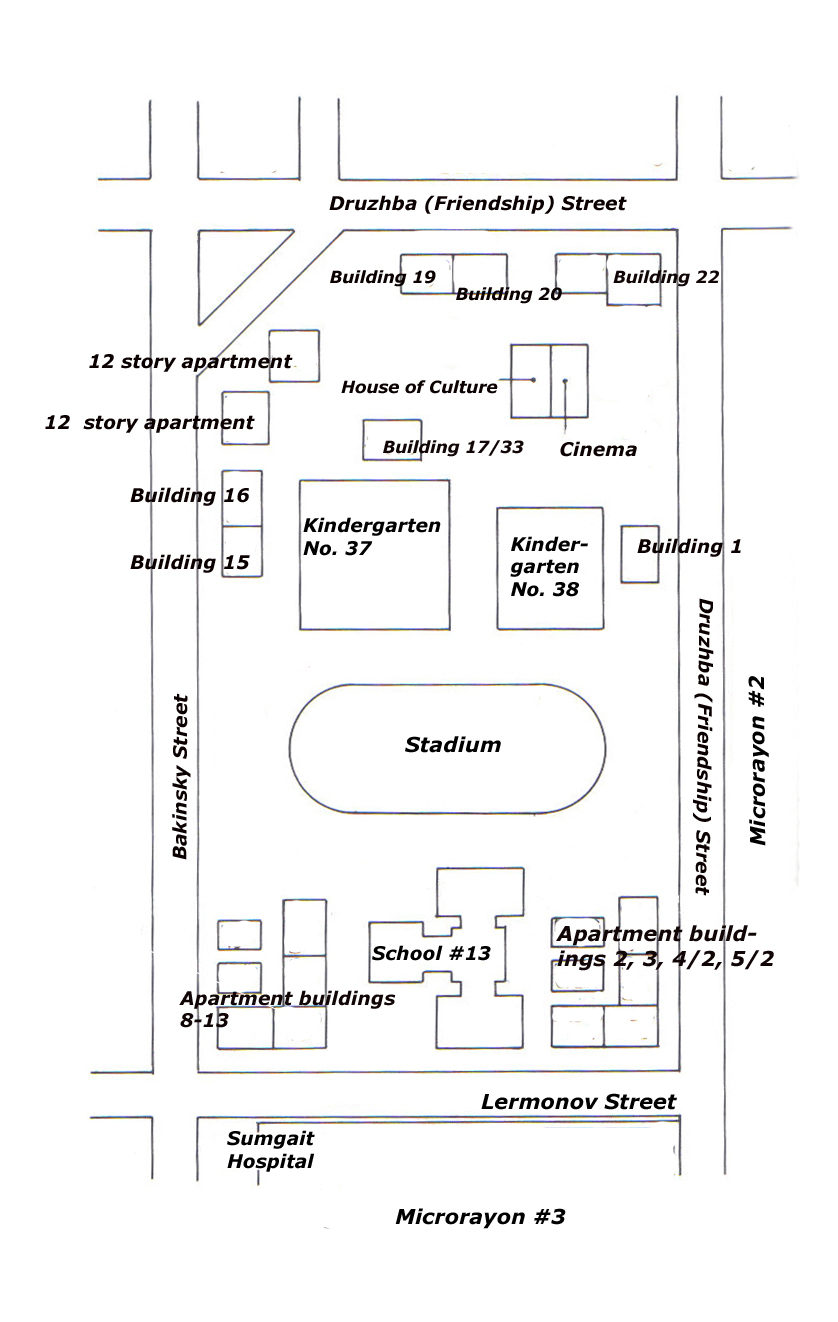
A map of Sumgait shows a section of the city's apartment districts, notable landmarks, and main streets

The rallies in Armenia were countered by demonstrations in Baku, during which time strong anti-Armenian sentiments were voiced by citizens and officials alike. One such statement came on February 14, 1988, when the head of the department of Central Committee of the Communist Party of Azerbaijan, Asadov, declared "a hundred thousand Azerbaijanis are ready to storm Karabakh at any time and organize a slaughter there."

On February 26, several minor rallies were held at Lenin Square in Sumgait. Explicit calls for violence against Armenians and for their expulsion from Azerbaijan were heard and the crowds were agitated by news of Azerbaijani refugees who had fled Armenia (from the towns of Kapan and Masis). Certain individuals told stories of murders and violence purportedly carried out by Armenians against the Azerbaijanis. Soviet authorities would later cast these individuals as agents provocateur. One individual, according to the Soviet press, was later revealed not to be a resident of Kapan, as he had claimed, but a criminal with a prior arrest record. Zardusht Alizadeh, who was active in the social and political life of Azerbaijan from 1988 to 1989 and was one of the founders of Azerbaijani Popular Front, visited Sumgait ten days after the pogrom and met with the workers from the aluminum factory, and reported that locals said that people from out of town had been inciting the violence. Baku's local party leader Fuad Musayev, who was called back to Baku because of the unrest, stated in the interview given to Thomas de Waal, "Someone was provoking them, propaganda work was going on." William E. Odom cites several pieces of evidence in his book The Collapse of the Soviet Military to indicate that the Soviet KGB may have orchestrated the events to allow the Soviet central government to respond, suppressing the Azeri Popular Front.

The demonstrations in the Lenin Square were concluded with strong anti-Armenian sentiments. During the demonstrations there were apparent threats and accusations against the Armenians for distorting the territorial integrity of Azerbaijan. The Armenians were also blamed for being much better-off than most of the Azerbaijanis in Sumgait. Slogans such as "Death to Armenians" and "Armenians get out of our city" were being voiced. There were also many public figures attending the rallies, among them the head of public school No. 25, an actress of the Arablinski theatre, Azerbaijani poet Khydyr Alovlu (a strong supporter of Heydar Aliyev) and others, who called for Armenians to be expelled from Azerbaijan or killed. Almost each speech was concluded with the slogan "Death to Armenians." Since the speakers used microphones these calls were heard not only in the square but also in the nearby streets.

Efforts to calm the crowd were made by Azerbaijani figures such as secretary of the city party committee Bayramova and poet Bakhtiyar Vahabzadeh, who addressed the crowd atop a platform. V. Huseinov, the director of the Institute of Political Education in Azerbaijan, also attempted to calm them by assuring them that Karabakh would remain within the republic and that the refugees' stories were false. He in turn was heckled with insults and forced to step down. Jahangir Muslimzade, Sumgait's first secretary, spoke to the crowd, and told them to allow Armenians to leave of their own accord. But according to witnesses, this message served to agitate the crowd. Shortly after his speech, at around 6:30 pm, Muslimzade was handed a flag of the Azerbaijan SSR and soon found himself leading the crowd. According to Muslimzade, he was attempting to lead the crowd away from the Armenian district and toward the sea, but many Armenians saw this act as implicating him as a leader of the riot. The crowd, in any case, dispersed and several groups made for the Armenian district.

=== Radio broadcast ===
Another factor that may have ignited the violence was an announcement of the murder of two Azerbaijanis. On February 27, Soviet Deputy Federal Procurator, Aleksandr Katusev, announced on Baku Radio and Central Television that two Azerbaijani youths, Bakhtiyar Guliyev and Ali Hajiyev, were killed in a clash between Armenians and Azerbaijanis near Aghdam several days earlier. One of the youths was killed by an Azerbaijani police officer, but Katusev neglected to mention that and would later receive a stinging rebuke for revealing the nationalities of the young men. The secretive nature the Soviet Union was still attempting to shake off led many Azerbaijanis to believe that there was something more nefarious to Katusev's report than he let on.

== Pogrom and atrocities ==
Most of the weapons during the attacks were sharpened metal objects said to be produced in the city's industrial plants.

The pogrom of the Armenian population of Sumgait started on the evening of February 27, one week after the appeal of the Council of People's Deputies to unify Nagorno-Karabakh with Armenia and according to many sources was a direct response to the council's decision. The perpetrators targeted the victims based solely on ethnicity — being Armenian was the only criterion. Some sources speak of premeditation ahead of the break-out of violence. Cobbles were brought into the city to block and limit access and exit from the town; the perpetrators had previously obtained the list of addresses of the Armenian residents of the city. Warnings by Azerbaijanis sympathetic to their Armenian neighbors instructed them to leave their lights on the night of the 27th; those who shut them off would be assumed to be Armenian. According to several Armenian witnesses and Soviet military personnel, alcohol and anasha, a term referring to narcotics, were brought in trucks and distributed to the crowds, although such accounts were not reported in the media. According to de Waal, the fact that the attackers were armed with homemade weapons that would have taken some time and effort to manufacture suggests a certain level of planning.

Violence broke on the evening of February 27. The attacking groups were of varying age groups. While the main participants were adult men and some women, there were also young students who took part in vandalizing and looting appliances, shoes, and clothing from the Armenians' homes. The mobs entered the apartment buildings and sought out Armenians where they lived. Some took shelter among their Azerbaijani and Russian neighbors, who also risked being attacked by the mobs. Others turned on the television to watch Azerbaijani music concerts and raised the volume to give the effect that they were in fact Azerbaijanis.

The pogrom was marked by atrocities and savagery. As de Waal describes it, "The roving gangs committed acts of horrific savagery. Several victims were so badly mutilated by axes that their bodies could not be identified. Women were stripped naked and set on fire. Several were raped repeatedly.”" Numerous acts of gang rape and other sexual abuse were committed, taking place in both the apartments and publicly on the city streets. An account of one such act that was also corroborated by witnesses described how a crowd stripped naked an Armenian woman and dragged her through the streets.

In the midst of the attacks, many Armenians sought to defend themselves and improvised by nailing their doors shut and arming themselves with axes, and in some instances a number of intruding rioters were killed. Calls to ambulance services were handled late or in many cases, unheeded completely. There was no intervention on the part of the police to stop the perpetrators. As mentioned by de Waal, "Another factor, which seems to have been a necessary condition for ethnic violence to begin, came into play: the local police did nothing. It later transpired that the local police force was overwhelmingly composed of Azerbaijanis and had only one professional Armenian officer."

The weekly Moskovskiye Novosti later reported that eight of the city's twenty ambulances had been destroyed by the mobs. Looting was prevalent and many attackers discussed among themselves on who would take possession of what after they had broken into the apartments. In some cases, televisions were stolen, along with other appliances and household goods; many apartments were vandalized and set on fire.

The lives of many Armenians were protected and saved by their Azerbaijani friends, neighbors or even strangers, who, at the risk of their own lives, let the Armenians hide in their houses or be escorted in their cars out of the city. According to Armenian witnesses, when Soviet troops went door-to-door searching for survivors, they managed to collect thousands of Armenians who had been hiding in Azeri households.

== Government reaction ==
Military police escorting Armenian civilians out of the town

The Soviet government's reaction to the riots was initially slow. Authorities were reluctant to send military units to impose martial law on the town. The spirit of glasnost had seen the Soviet Union more tolerant in responding to such politically charged issues. However, Soviet officials in Azerbaijan, some of whom were witnessing the attacks, appealed to Kremlin leaders to dispatch Soviet troops to Sumgait. In a Soviet Politburo session on the third day of the rioting (February 29), Gorbachev and his senior cabinet conferred on several subjects before discussing the events of Sumgait. When the issue was finally raised, Gorbachev voiced his opposition to the proposal of sending in troops but cabinet members Foreign Minister Eduard Shevardnadze and Defense Minister Dmitry Yazov, fearing an escalation of violence, persuaded him otherwise.

Meanwhile, on the previous day, two battalions from the MVD, troops mainly equipped with truncheons and riot gear (those troops who were armed with firearms were armed with blanks and not given the permission to open fire), arrived in Sumgait in buses and armored personnel carriers. As they moved in to secure the town, the soldiers found themselves as targets of the mob. In what became a startling sight for the city's residents, the soldiers were attacked and maimed with the improvised steel objects. Their armored vehicles were flipped over and in some cases disabled by Molotov cocktails, as the troops found themselves in complete disarray.

By February 29, the situation had worsened to the point where authorities were forced to call in more professional and heavily armed troops, who were given the right to use deadly force. A contingent made up of elements of the Felix Dzerzhinsky Division of the Internal Troops; a company of marines from the Caspian Sea Naval Flotilla; troops from Dagestan; an assault landing brigade; military police; and the 137th Guards Airborne Regiment of the Airborne Forces from Ryazan – a military force of nearly 10,000 men under the overall command of a Lieutenant General Krayev – made its way to Sumgait. Tanks were brought in and ordered to cordon off the city. Andrei Shilkov, a Russian journalist for the periodical Glasnost, counted at least 47 tanks and reported also seeing troops wearing bulletproof vests patrolling the town, an implication that firearms were present and used during the rioting.

A curfew was imposed from 8:00 pm to 7:00 am as skirmishes between troops and rioters continued. Krayev ordered troops to rescue Armenians left in their apartments. By the evening of the 29th, martial law was imposed and troops in buses and personnel carriers were patrolling the streets of Sumgait. Under heavily armed guard, civilian buses and APCs transported Armenian residents to the Samed Vurgun Cultural Facility (known as the SK) in the city's main square. The SK building was designed to accommodate several hundred people, though as many as several thousand eventually found shelter there.

== Aftermath ==
By March 1, Soviet troops had effectively quelled the rioting. Investigations were slated to begin immediately; however, waste disposal trucks cleaned much of the debris on the streets before they arrived. Soviet authorities arrested over 400 men in connection to the rioting and violence. The Soviet media did not initially report the event and remained largely silent, broadcasting instead news related to foreign affairs while the media in Sumgait spoke only on local issues unrelated to the massacre. The Soviet government was initially hesitant to admit that violence had taken place; however, when it did, it was quick to downplay the scale of the event, describing the rioting that had occurred as that perpetrated by "hooligans." TASS reported of "rampage and violence" taking place in Sumgait on March 1, which was provoked on the part of a "group of hooligans" who engaged in various criminal acts. Western journalists were denied access to visit the town by Soviet authorities.

On April 28, 1988, images of the pogrom were broadcast in a 90-minute documentary by Soviet journalist Genrikh Borovik. Borovik criticized the media blackout imposed by the Soviet government, claiming that it ran against Gorbachev's aims of greater openness under glasnost. Eduard Shevardnadze later remarked on the failure to report the massacre in Sumgait as a failure of glasnost itself: "the old mechanisms kicked in, simplifying, distorting or just eliminating the truth about [this event]."

== Criminal proceedings ==
Soviet authorities arrested 400 men in connection to the massacre and prepared criminal charges for 84 (82 Azerbaijanis, one Russian, and one Armenian). Taleh Ismailov, a pipe-fitter from one of Sumgait's industrial plants, was charged with premeditated murder and was the first to be tried by the Soviet Supreme Court in Moscow in May 1988. By October 1988, nine men had been sentenced, including Ismailov, who was sentenced to 15 years in prison with a further 33 on trial. Other sentences were more harsh: Ahmad Ahmadov was found guilty and sentenced to be shot by a firing squad for leading a mob and taking part in the murder of seven people. However, 90 of those who were tried were set free after a relatively short time as they were sentenced for hooliganism, rather than for murder and violence.

There were many who expressed their dissatisfaction with the way the trials were organized and conducted. Soviet historian and dissident Roy Medvedev questioned the trials: "Who knows why, but the court examined the Sumgait events by subdividing them into single episodes and not as a programmatic act of genocide." Most Armenians and Azerbaijanis were also dissatisfied with the trials. Armenians complained that the true instigators of the pogrom were never caught whereas Azerbaijanis stated the sentences were too harsh and were upset with the fact that the trials were not held in Azerbaijan. Some Azerbaijanis even went on to campaign for the "freedom for the heroes of Sumgait."

== Reactions ==
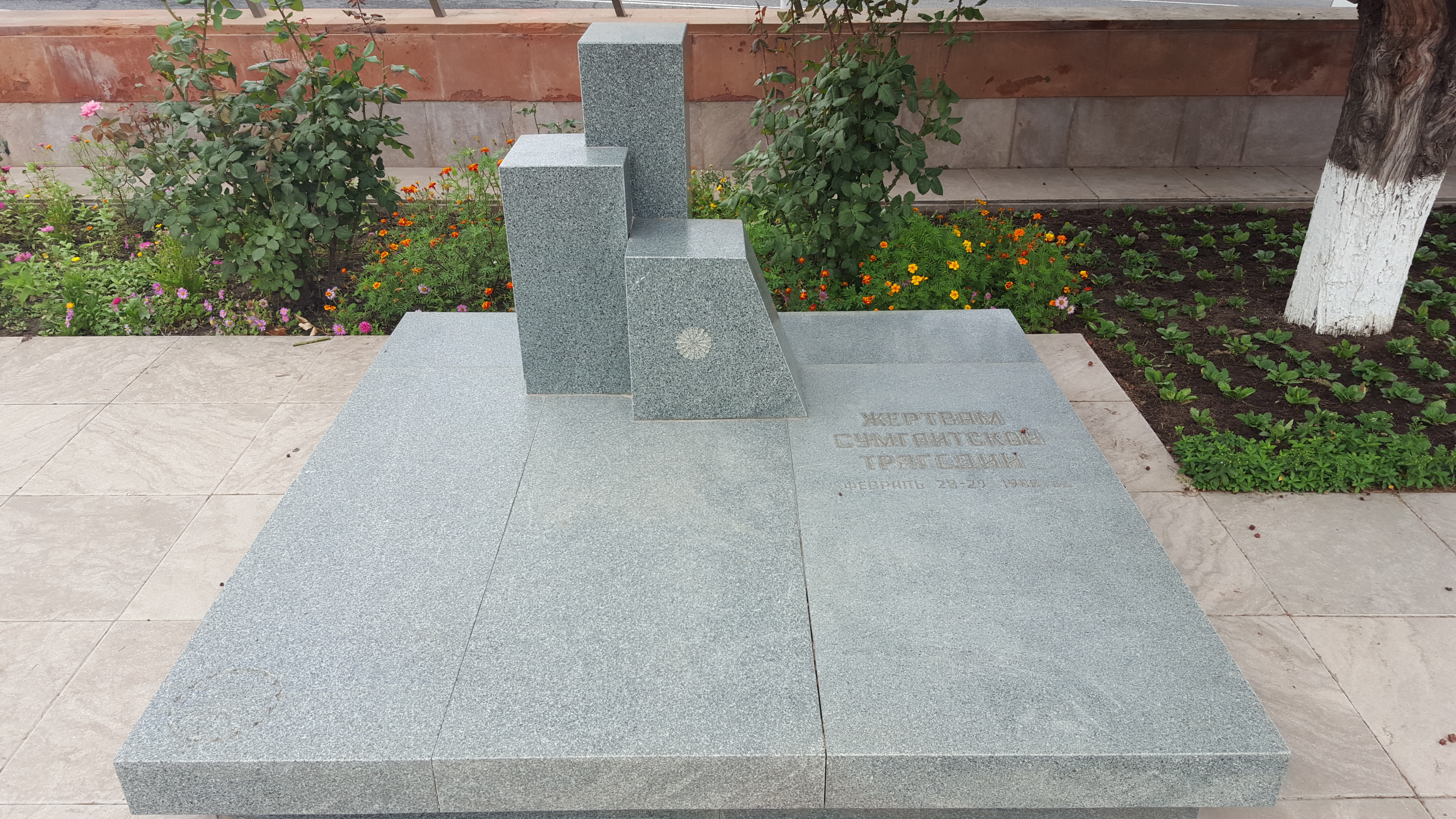
A memorial dedicated to the victims of the pogrom in Stepanakert, Nagorno-Karabakh

=== In Armenia and Karabakh ===
The pogrom was immediately linked to the Armenian genocide of 1915 in the Armenian national consciousness. On the Armenian Genocide Remembrance Day on April 24, 1988, a khachkar (cross stone) dedicated to the pogrom victims was planted at the Armenian Genocide memorial at Tsitsernakaberd.

February 28 was designated as a public holiday in Armenia in 2005. It is officially known as "The Day of Memory of the Victims of Massacres in Azerbaijani SSR and Protection of the Rights of the Deported Armenian Population".

=== International ===
In July 1988, within months of the Sumgait massacre, the United States Senate unanimously passed Amendment 2690 to the Fiscal Year 1989 Foreign Operations Appropriations bill (H.R. 4782), concerning the Karabakh conflict, which called on the Soviet government to "respect the legitimate aspirations of the Armenian people …" and noted that "dozens of Armenians have been killed and hundreds injured during the recent unrests…"

On July 7, 1988, the European Parliament passed a resolution condemning the violence against Armenians in Azerbaijan.

On July 27, 1990, 130 leading academics and human rights advocates wrote "An Open Letter to International Public Opinion on Anti-Armenian Pogroms in the Soviet Union" published in the New York Times. The letter, which was signed by professors from Johns Hopkins, Princeton, Berkeley, UCLA, Wesleyan University, University of Paris IV Sorbonne and other universities, urged the international community to take action to protect the Armenian community in Azerbaijan.

== Conspiracy theories in Azerbaijan ==
Several conspiracy theories spawned in the wake of the pogrom alternatively attributed to the KGB, the CIA, and the Armenians themselves.

=== "Armenian provocation" ===
In mid-1988, Bill Keller wrote in the New York Times that "… among Sumgait's Azerbaijani majority that the riots Feb. 27, 28 and 29 were deliberately contrived by Armenian extremists in order to discredit Azerbaijan in the battle for the world's sympathy... [despite there being] no evidence to support this conclusion." Historian and head of the Azerbaijani Academy of Sciences Ziya Bunyadov, whom Thomas de Waal calls "Azerbaijan's foremost Armenophobe", claimed that the massacre had been instigated by the Armenians to cast a negative light upon Azerbaijan. In an article that appeared in the Azerbaijani journal Elm, Bunyadov claimed that Armenians had organized the pogroms: "The Sumgait tragedy was carefully prepared by Armenian nationalists... Several hours after it began, Armenian photographers and TV journalists secretly entered the city where they awaited in readiness." Bunyadov's thesis was hinged on the fact that Sumgait Armenians had withdrawn more than one million rubles from their savings before the attacks. To support his thesis, he had also drawn attention to the fact that one of the participants in the riots and killings was Eduard Grigorian, a man of mixed Russian-Armenian lineage who was freed after while later in Russia, and who had three previous criminal convictions and pretended to be Azerbaijani. Grigorian was a factory worker who took part in gang rapes and mass attacks and was subsequently sentenced to 12 years for his role in the massacres. Grigorian had been brought up in Sumgait by his Russian mother following the early death of his Armenian father, and his ethnic identity is considered irrelevant since he appropriately fit the profile of a "pogromshchik, a thuggish young man, of indeterminate nationality with a criminal past, seeking violence for its own sake." This view has since gained wider currency in all of Azerbaijan today, where it is still euphemistically referred to in the media and by government officials as the "Sumgait events" (Sumqayıt hadisələri).

By 2018 the conspiracy theory was adopted by the government for the first time, according to journalist Shahin Rzayev. An investigation by the Prosecutor General's Office stated that "Armenians living in Sumgayit tried to provocatively burn down their homes and property and blame Azerbaijanis." According to their investigation a "diversion group" of 20–25 people who "weren’t residents of Sumgayit and were speaking in Armenian among themselves" instigated the attacks.

This conspiracy theory, though discredited, is supported by Azerbaijan's president Aliyev: “I without reservation declare that the Sumgait events were carried out by Armenian nationalists and Armenian groups...The Sumgait events were used as to expand the black PR campaign against Azerbaijan, and as a result the Nagorno-Karabakh conflict happened.”

== Other theories ==
According to CPSU Politburo member Alexander Yakovlev, the Sumgait pogrom was arranged by KGB agents provocateurs to "justify the importance of the Soviet secret services". George Soros wrote in a 1989 article in the New York Review of Books: "It is not far-fetched to speculate that the first pogroms against Armenians in Azerbaijan were instigated by the notorious local mafia, which is controlled by the KGB official G.A. Alieev [Heydar Aliyev], in order to create a situation in which Gorbachev would lose, no matter what he did." Two authors commented in 2004, "Although that possibility cannot be ruled out, hard evidence is still lacking." American analyst Paul A. Goble suggested in a 2015 interview with the Armenian service of Voice of America that the pogrom was perpetrated by a "group of Azerbaijani criminals by the provocation of the KGB."

Davud Imanov, an Azerbaijani filmmaker, expanded on this theory in a series of films called the Echo of Sumgait where he accused Armenians, Russians and Americans of conspiring together against Azerbaijan and claiming that Karabakh movement was a plot organized by the CIA.

== See also ==
- Anti-Armenian sentiment in Azerbaijan
- Gugark pogrom (1988)
- Kirovabad pogrom (1988)
- Baku pogrom (1990)
- Operation Ring (1991)
- Maraga massacre (1992)
- Khojaly Massacre (1992)
- Siege of Stepanakert

Similar international events:

- Tulsa race massacre (1921)
- Gujarat riots (2002)
