= Kirovabad pogrom =

Pogrom in Kirovabad formerly Ganja

- Part of the Nagorno-Karabakh conflict, the First Nagorno-Karabakh War and the dissolution of the Soviet Union
- Location: Kirovabad, Azerbaijan SSR
- Date: November 1988
- Target: Armenian population of the city
- Attack type: Pogrom
- Deaths: 130 Armenians (per human rights activists), 7 (per Soviet authorities)
- Perpetrator: Azerbaijanis

The Kirovabad pogrom or the pogrom of Kirovabad was an Azeri-led ethnic cleansing that targeted Armenians living in the city of Kirovabad (today called Ganja) in Soviet Azerbaijan during November 1988.

== Pogrom ==
An unidentified Armenian press editor said the commander of the Soviet troops asked the Ministry of Internal Affairs (MVD) in Moscow for permission to evacuate some of the city's Armenian population of 100,000. The conflict intensified in the fall of 1988, as the Armenians of Kirovabad and the surrounding countryside were driven from their homes and forced to seek safe haven in Armenia. According to Los Angeles Times, an article published on November 27, 1988, "Soviet soldiers have blocked dozens of Azerbaijani attempts to massacre Armenians in their homes in the continuing communal violence in the southern Soviet republic of Azerbaijan, a senior military commander there said Saturday." Over 40,000 Armenians were forced to leave Kirovabad (now Ganja).

On November 23, martial law was declared in Kirovabad, meaning that troops could now respond with rifle fire. That same day, an attempt of pogrom against the building of the city's executive committee took place. During the clashes between the aggressive crowd and the armed forces who tried to keep the order and to defend the Armenian citizens three soldiers were killed, and 67 people were wounded. Hooligans burned down and damaged military vehicles.

=== Death toll ===
Yuri Rost mentions sources reporting that the number of fatalities had risen to forty by 24 November, one third of whom were Azerbaijanis killed in clashes with the Soviet troops. Human rights activists reported, that up to 130 Armenians were killed in Kirovabad alone and "with warnings of possible genocide, appealing for swift action by the government to halt Azerbaijani attacks on Armenians." On 25 November 1988, Soviet human rights activist Andrei Sakharov, in Massachusetts during the unrest, said he had received reports from the Soviet Union that more than 130 Armenians were killed and more than 200 wounded in the violence. However the Soviet authorities denied Sakharov's claims, with Foreign Ministry spokesman Gennady Gerasimov saying that the information about the casualties was not accurate. The New York Times also reported that "official and unofficial informants in the two republics who have provided reliable reports during the last nine months of unrest discounted the higher figures, saying they were based on second- and third-hand accounts". Later Sakharov admitted in his memoirs that his statement was a mistake and that he should not have used concrete figures about the numbers of Armenian casualties in Kirovabad. He wrote:

During this time Armenian – Azerbaijani problems aggravated again. Pogroms and violence started in Kirovabad. The situation there was terrible – hundreds of women and children were hiding in a church, which with much difficulty was protected by soldiers, who (as reports claimed) were armed only with mine shovels. Soldiers indeed were having a hard time, and they behaved heroically. There were casualties among them. Soon we received information that a large number of Armenians was killed. As it turned out later, the reports came from one person, who let's say was not quite accurate and responsible. But they reached Moscow through various channels and appeared to be independent and trustworthy. Lusya, who trusted these reports (and it was hard not to trust them) transmitted them to me in the USA by telephone, and I used the received figures in a telephone message to Mitterrand (he just arrived to Moscow with an official visit, and I called by night to the French embassy) and in a public statement. This was one of the annoying errors that I have made in the recent years. Of course, I should not have at least used the specific figures.

The Soviet authorities confirmed the death of 7 people at the time of the events. This figure included 3 Soviet soldiers, 3 Azerbaijanis and 1 Armenian. Angus Roxburgh during the violence reported that at least six more Armenians were killed due to ethnic cleansing in Kirovabad.

According to Victor Krivopuskov, a USSR officer and the Head of the investigatory-operative group sent to the region at the time, there were 3 main waves of mass pogroms against Armenians in Azerbaijan: Sumgait, Kirovabad and Baku pogroms, which resulted in 30000 Armenian refugees in Naghorno-Karabakh alone (not including refugees to Armenia or other USSR republics). In his memoirs published in 2007 he characterised these events as "a state policy of pan-Turkism" carried out against the backdrop of chaos and crisis, under the guise of turbulences of perestroika.

== See also ==
- Sumgait pogrom (1988)
- Baku pogrom (1990)
- Maraga Massacre (1992)
- Anti-Armenianism
- List of massacres in Azerbaijan
