= Black Garden =

2003 book by Thomas de Waal

Black Garden: Armenia and Azerbaijan Through Peace and War
- First edition
- Author: Thomas de Waal
- Language: English
- Subject: First Nagorno-Karabakh War
- Publisher: NYU Press
- Publication date: 2003
- Publication place: United Kingdom
- Media type: Print
- Pages: 360 pages
- ISBN: 0-8147-6032-5

Black Garden: Armenia and Azerbaijan Through Peace and War is a 2003 book by Thomas de Waal, based on a study of Armenia and Azerbaijan, two former Soviet republics, during the First Nagorno-Karabakh War. It consists of a history of the Nagorno-Karabakh conflict since 1988 combined with interviews conducted on the ground in the aftermath of the war.

The book won the Outstanding Academic Title 2003 award from Choice Reviews.

== Reviews ==
Neal Ascherson in The New York Review of Books described Black Garden as "admirable and rigorous" and Amer Latif in Parameters called it "a lucid, evenhanded analysis of the intricacies of this conflict". Time magazine reviewer Paul Quinn-Judge and Robert Chenciner in International Affairs also gave the book positive reviews.

The book was particularly praised for its balanced approach given the ethno-nationalist nature of the conflict. In African and Asian Studies, Samuel Andoh wrote that "most articles on the conflict tend to partial towards one side or the other, putting the blame on Armenia or Azerbaijan ... Black Garden ... is probably one of the few exceptions."

Writing in Foreign Affairs, Robert Legvold praised de Waal for providing "a deeper and more compelling account of the conflict than anyone before ... one likely to exercise give-no-quarters partisans on both sides."

Writing in Nationalities Papers, Ruzan Hakobyan praises the book for being "one of the best and most comprehensive works not only on the Karabagh conflict but also on the region as a whole". However, in the same review she also explains that "an informed eye can detect certain drawbacks". Hakobyan lists two drawbacks, the first one being, according to her, the repeated assertion that the start of the conflict was unexpected for both Armenians and Azeris of Karabakh who lived peacefully and in good relations side-by-side, labeling this as "at the very least optimistic" . Within the context of providing an example, Hakobyan states: "For 70 years Armenians in Karabagh have been systematically subjected to a deliberate policy of discrimination and removal from their homeland and have made repeated attempts to rectify the situation". She then proceeds to list the gradual decrease and increase of the Karabakhi Armenia and Azerbaijani population, respectively, during Soviet rule by using Soviet censuses. Another drawback mentioned by Hakobyan: "one cannot help detecting is that in trying to be impartial the author sometimes slips into flatly equalizing the behaviours of the Armenians and the Azeris during the years of the conflict, thus undermining the historical reality. For instance, he [de Waal] repeatedly claims that the Azeri population that left Armenia in the first year of the conflict has undergone the same inhuman treatment from Armenians as the Armenian population in Sumgait and Baku. But he has no data on which to base this assertion. All he manages to produce are the unfounded assertions of the Azeri population itself, while the atrocities that Azeris had performed towards the Armenian population in Sumgait and Baku are thoroughly documented and widely known". She concludes the review by mentioning that Black Garden, even with such drawbacks, remains of high quality and significance.

== Criticism ==
A number of Armenian academics and analysts were critical of the book, arguing that it presents a false balance between Armenia and Azerbaijan and contains inaccuracies. Professor Alexander Manasyan of Yerevan State University, in reviewing Black Garden, wrote that de Waal "supports the point of view which is steered by the propaganda machine of Baku" and "carries out [the] Azerbaijani position by distorting the essence of the problem, masterfully going around all the unfavorable to Azerbaijani position facts and events [sic], skillfully offering lie as believable truth".

The book was also criticized by Karen Vrtanesyan, an Armenian expert for the Ararat Center for Strategic Research, as "a banal propaganda but not an objective research on [the] Armenian-Azerbaijani conflict." Vrtanesyan concludes that "Black Garden is not an unbiased work, neither can its author be considered a neutral observer."

Tatul Hakobyan, an independent Armenian analyst and journalist, wrote that de Waal had quoted Serzh Sargsyan out of context in the Black Garden regarding the latter's comments about the Khojaly Massacre.
