= Nagorno-Karabakh Autonomous Oblast =

Autonomous region of the Azerbaijan SSR (1923–1991)

Coordinates: 39.8153°N 46.7519°E

- Autonomous oblast of the Azerbaijan Soviet Socialist Republic
- 1923–1991
- Location of the Nagorno-Karabakh AO in the European Soviet Union.
- Capital: Stepanakert
- Area
  - 1989: 4,388 km^{2} (1,694 sq mi)
- Population
  - 1989: 189,085
- Government
  - Type: Autonomous oblast
- History
  - Established: July 7 1923
  - Abolished: November 26 1991
Preceded by	Succeeded by
Transcaucasian Socialist Federative Soviet Republic	Republic of Nagorno-Karabakh; Azerbaijan
- Today part of: Azerbaijan

The Nagorno-Karabakh Autonomous Oblast (NKAO) (Note: Russian: Нагорно-Карабахская автономная область (НКАО), romanized: Nagorno-Karabakhskaya avtonomnaya oblast' (NKAO); Azerbaijani: Dağlıq Qarabağ Muxtar Vilayəti (DQMV); Armenian: Լեռնային Ղարաբաղի Ինքնավար Մարզ (ԼՂԻՄ), romanized: Lerrnayin Gharabaghi Ink’navar Marz (LGhIM)) was an autonomous oblast within the Azerbaijan Soviet Socialist Republic that was created on July 7, 1923. Its capital was the city of Stepanakert. The majority of the population were ethnic Armenians.

== History ==
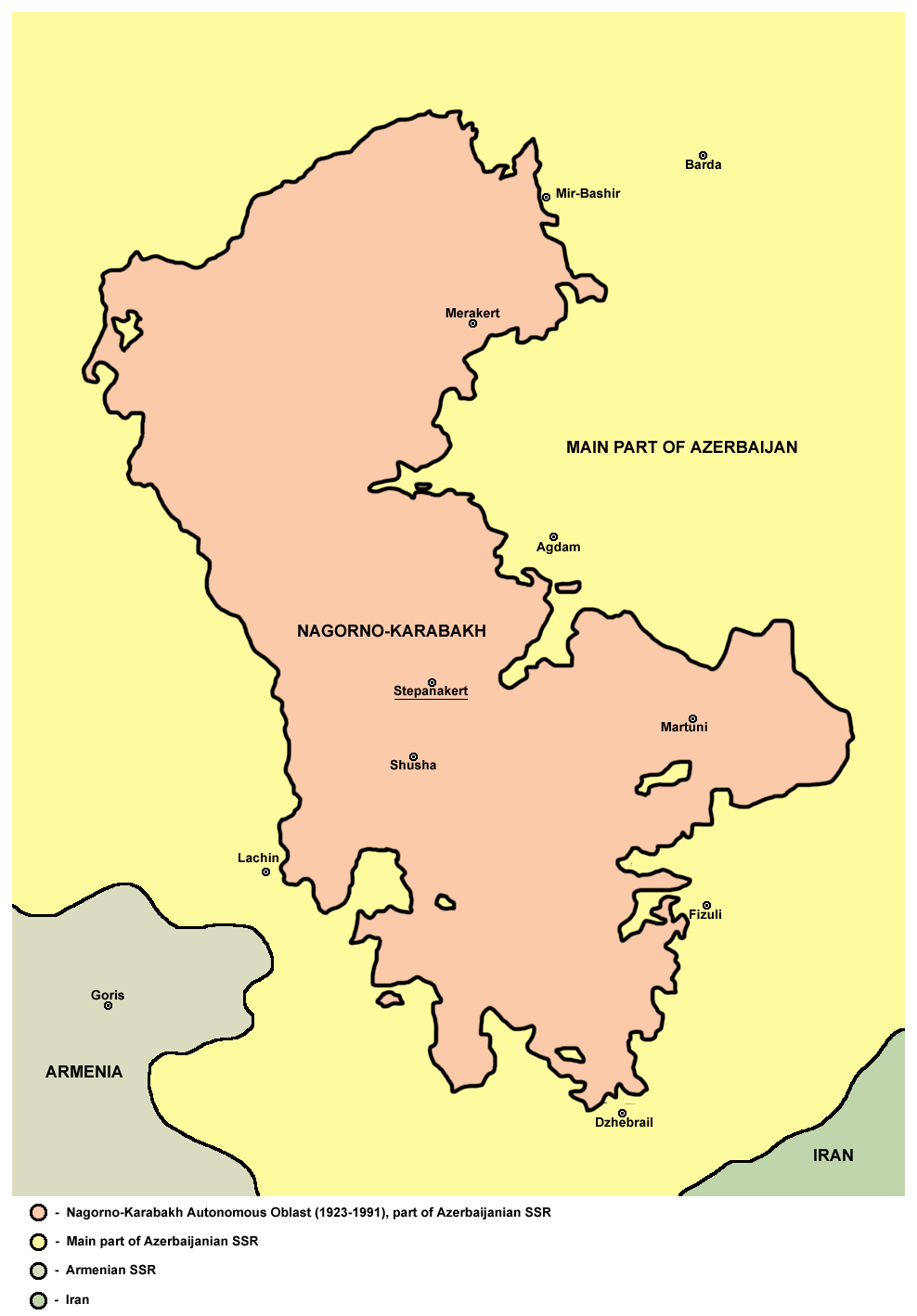
Principal cities of the oblast

The area of Nagorno-Karabakh was disputed between the First Republic of Armenia and the Azerbaijan Democratic Republic during their short-lived independence from 1918 to 1920. After the Sovietization of both republics, the Kavbiuro of the Bolshevik Party decided to keep the area within the newly-formed Azerbaijan SSR, whilst granting it broad regional autonomy. Initially, the principal city of Karabakh, Shusha, and its surrounding villages were to be excluded from the autonomy as they were predominantly Azerbaijani, particularly after the massacre and expulsion of the majority Armenian population of Shusha—this decision was later reversed in 1923 when Shusha was joined to the NKAO despite protests from Muslim villages who favoured its inclusion into the Kurdistan uezd instead.

On July 7, 1923, the Nagorno-Karabakh Autonomous Oblast was formally established and the capital was moved to Stepanakert, named after the revolutionary Stepan Shaumian. At the time of its formation, area of the oblast was 4,161 km^{2} (1,607 sq mi). According to the 1926 Soviet census, its population was 125,200 people, among whom Armenians accounted for 89.2 percent. However, by the 1989 census, the share of Armenians dropped to 76.9 percent of the population. Reasons for this include the policy of Soviet Azerbaijani authorities to settle Azerbaijanis in the region and some out-migration of Karabakh Armenians, as well as the generally higher birthrate among Azerbaijanis than among Armenians.

Although the question of Nagorno-Karabakh's status did not become a major public issue until the late 1980s, Karabakh Armenian activists, Armenian intellectuals, and Soviet Armenian leaders periodically appealed to Moscow for the oblast's transfer to the Armenian SSR. In November 1945, Armenian First Secretary Grigory Arutinov appealed to Joseph Stalin to attach the NKAO to Soviet Armenia, a proposal vetoed by Azerbaijan's Mir Jafar Baghirov. Following Nikita Khrushchev's "Secret Speech" in 1956, Armenian Catholicos Vazgen I raised the matter of the NKAO's status in a letter to Nikolai Bulganin. In 1962, Karabakh Armenian residents appealed to Khrushchev, "enumerating their grievances with official Baku and requesting the transfer of their territories from the jurisdiction of Soviet Azerbaijan to that of either Soviet Armenia or the Russian SFSR." The demands from the NKAO were boosted in 1966 by an appeal signed by 1,906 Soviet Armenian intellectual and cultural figures, including Martiros Saryan, Yervand Kochar, Hamo Sahyan, and Paruyr Sevak. Although their appeal was endorsed by Armenian First Secretary Anton Kochinyan and Badal Muradyan, it was vetoed by Baku, "reportedly with backstage support from Mikhail Suslov."

The rise of Heydar Aliyev to the leadership of the Azerbaijani SSR in 1969 saw increasing attempts to tighten Baku's control over the autonomous oblast and alter its demographics. In 1973–74, Aliyev purged the entire NKAO leadership, who Baku regarded as "Armenian nationalists." He appointed Boris Kevorkov, an Armenian from outside the NKAO, as the oblast's First Secretary. In 1977, the prominent Armenian author Sero Khanzadyan wrote an open letter to Leonid Brezhnev calling for Nagorno-Karabakh's annexation to Soviet Armenia.

Inspired by Mikhail Gorbachev's reforms of glasnost and perestroika, the Karabakh Armenians began a democratic mass movement to unite their region with the Armenian SSR. On February 20, 1988, the Supreme Soviet of the NKAO voted to unify with Soviet Armenia. Open conflict soon broke out between the local Armenian population and the government of the Azerbaijan SSR. The fighting escalated into the First Nagorno-Karabakh War by the end of 1991. On November 26 of that year, the Supreme Soviet of Azerbaijan formally abolished the autonomous status of the oblast. In response, the majority Armenian population declared their independence as the Nagorno-Karabakh Republic on December 10, with the support of Armenia.

== Administrative divisions ==
There were five administrative divisions or raions in the NKAO:

- Mardakert District (NKAO)
- Martuni District (NKAO)
- Shusha District (NKAO)
- Askeran District (NKAO)
- Hadrut District (NKAO)

== Demographics ==
Historical ethnic composition of the Nagorno-Karabakh Autonomous Oblast in 1921–1989
Ethnic group	1921	1923	1925	1926	1939	1959	1970	1979	1989
Armenians	122,715 (88.62%)	149,600 (94.8%)	142,470 (90.28%)	111,694 (89.24%)	132,800 (88.04%)	110,053 (84.39%)	121,068 (80.54%)	123,076 (75.89%)	145,450 (76.92%)
Azerbaijanis	15,444 (11.15%)	7,700 (4.9%)	15,261 (9.67%)	12,592 (10.06%)	14,053 (9.32%)	17,995 (13.80%)	27,179 (18.08%)	37,264 (22.98%)	40,688 (21.52%)
Russians	307 (0.22%)	500 (0.3%)	46 (0.03%)	596 (0.48%)	3,174 (2.10%)	1,790 (1.37%)	1,310 (0.87%)	1,265 (0.78%)	1,922 (1.02%)
Ukrainians	307 (0.22%)	500 (0.3%)	30 (0.02%)	35 (0.03%)	436 (0.29%)	238 (0.18%)	193 (0.13%)	140 (0.09%)	416 (0.22%)
Belarusians	307 (0.22%)	500 (0.3%)	30 (0.02%)	12 (0.01%)	11 (0.01%)	32 (0.02%)	35 (0.02%)	37 (0.02%)	79 (0.04%)
Greeks	307 (0.22%)	500 (0.3%)	30 (0.02%)	68 (0.05%)	74 (0.05%)	67 (0.05%)	33 (0.02%)	56 (0.03%)	72 (0.04%)
Tatars	307 (0.22%)	500 (0.3%)	30 (0.02%)	6 (0.00%)	29 (0.02%)	36 (0.03%)	25 (0.02%)	41 (0.03%)	64 (0.03%)
Georgians	307 (0.22%)	500 (0.3%)	30 (0.02%)	5 (0.00%)	25 (0.02%)	16 (0.01%)	22 (0.01%)	17 (0.01%)	57 (0.03%)
Others	307 (0.22%)	500 (0.3%)	30 (0.02%)	151 (0.12%)	235 (0.16%)	179 (0.14%)	448 (0.30%)	285 (0.18%)	337 (0.18%)
TOTAL	138,466	157,800	157,807	125,159	150,837	130,406	150,313	162,181	189,085

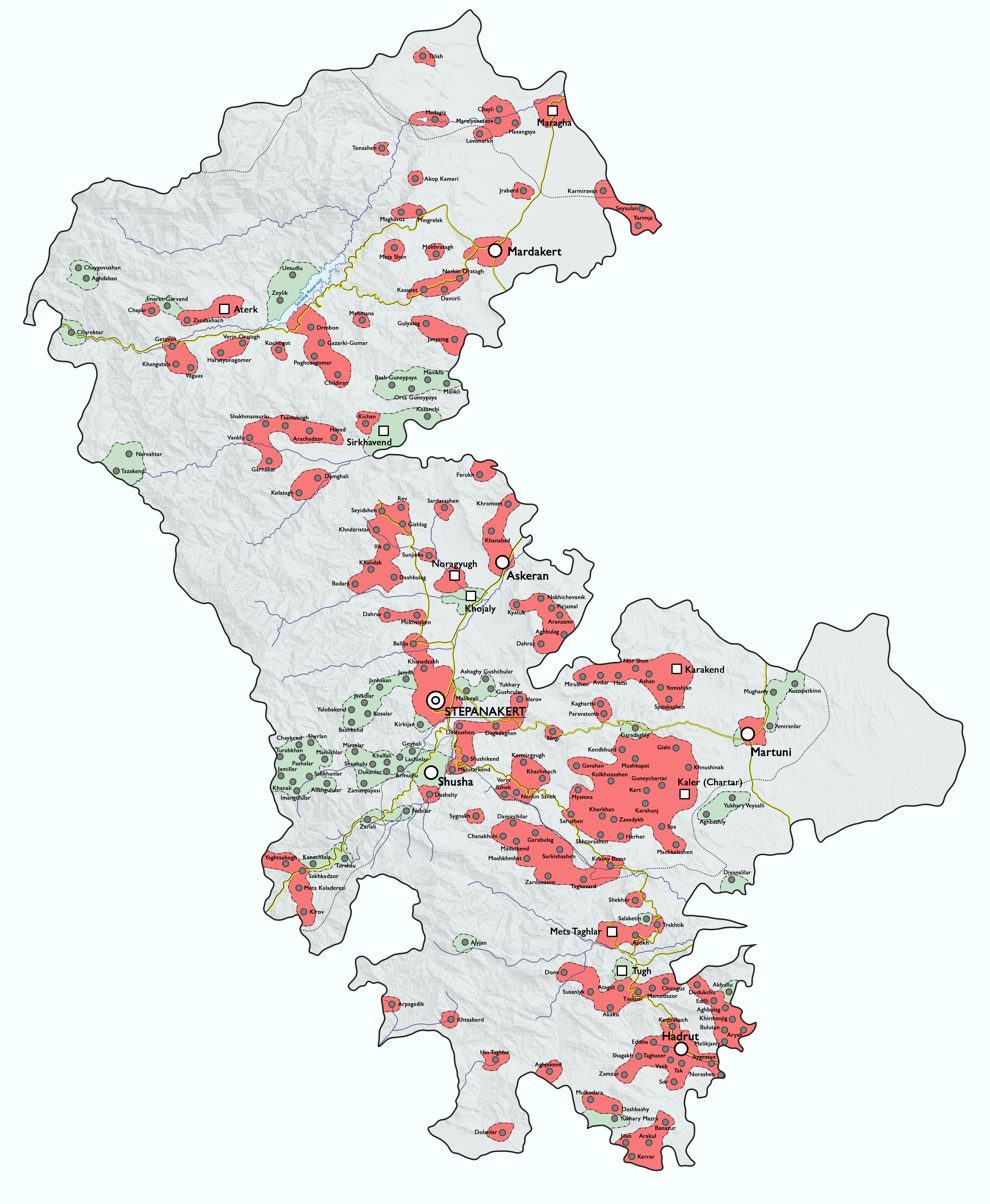
Map showing the Armenian and Azerbaijani population centers in the Nagorno-Karabakh Autonomous Oblast in 1989, before the dissolution of the Soviet Union. Armenian population centers Azerbaijani population centers Uninhabited areas (mountains, agricultural land, etc.)

== First Secretaries ==
The First Secretary of the Nagorno-Karabakh Autonomous Oblast Committee of the Communist Party of Azerbaijan was the Communist Party of Azerbaijan's head and highest executive power within the oblast. The position was created in July 1923, and abolished on August 27, 1990. The position of First Secretary was de facto appointed by the Politburo of the Soviet Union or by the General Secretary of the Communist Party of the Soviet Union. Below is a list of office-holders:

Name	Term of Office	
Name	Start	End
First Secretaries of the Oblast Committee of the Communist Party
Sero Manutsyan	July 1923	December 1923
Akop Kamari (Bendzhanyan)	December 1923	March 1924
Nikolai Sarkisov	April 1924	August 1924
Artvazd Saakyants	October 1924	August 1929
Ashot Karamyan	August 1929	June 1930
Khoren Varunts	June 1930	August 1931
Karo Grigoryan	August 1931	August 1933
Bagrat Batikyan	August 1933	March 1934
Petr Poghosov	April 1934	September 1937
Mikhail Manukyants (1st)	September 1937	1940
Aleksandr Avanesov	1940	January 1942
Vacant	January 1942	March 1942
Yegishe Grigoryan (1st)	March 1942	1946
Mikhail Manukyants (2nd)	1946	1948
Tigran Grigoryan	1948	January 1949
Sedrak Abramov	January 1949	1952
Yegishe Grigoryan (2nd)	1952	December 1958
Nikolai Shakhnazarov	December 1958	October 1962
Gurgen Melkumyan	25 October 1962	27 October 1973
Boris Kevorkov	27 October 1973	24 February 1988
Genrikh Poghosyan	24 February 1988	20 January 1989
Vagan Gabrielyan	20 January 1989	27 August 1990

== See also ==
- Nagorno-Karabakh
- Karabakh

== Bibliography ==
- Атлас Союза Советских Социалистических Республик [Atlas of the Union of Soviet Socialist Republics]. Moscow: Central Executive Committee of the USSR. 1928.
- Chrysanthopoulos, Leonidas T. (2002). Caucasus Chronicles: Nation-Building and Diplomacy in Armenia, 1993–1994. London: Gomidas Institute. ISBN 978-1-884630-05-7.
- Goff, Krista A. (2020). Nested Nationalism: Making and Unmaking Nations in the Soviet Caucasus. Ithaca, NY: Cornell University Press. ISBN 978-1-5017-5327-5.
- Hewsen, Robert H. (2001). Armenia: A Historical Atlas. Chicago: University of Chicago Press. ISBN 978-0-226-33228-4.
- Malkasian, Mark (1996). Gha-ra-bagh!: The Emergence of the National Democratic Movement in Armenia. Detroit: Wayne State University Press. ISBN 0-8143-2605-6.
- Saparov, Arsène (2015). From Conflict to Autonomy in the Caucasus: The Soviet Union and the Making of Abkhazia, South Ossetia and Nagorno Karabakh. London: Routledge. ISBN 978-1-317-63783-7. OCLC 1124532887.
- Shakarian, Pietro A. (2025). Anastas Mikoyan: An Armenian Reformer in Khrushchev's Kremlin. Bloomington: Indiana University Press. ISBN 978-0253073556.
- Suny, Ronald Grigor (1993). Looking toward Ararat: Armenia in Modern History. Bloomington: Indiana University Press. ISBN 978-0-253-20773-9.
- Tsutsiev, Arthur (2014). Atlas of the Ethno-Political History of the Caucasus (PDF). Translated by Nora Seligman Favorov. New Haven: Yale University Press. ISBN 9780300153088. Archived (PDF) from the original on June 17, 2023.
- Welt, Cory D. (2004). Explaining Ethnic Conflict in the South Caucasus: Mountainous Karabagh, Abkhazia, and South Ossetia (PDF). Cambridge, MA: Massachusetts Institute of Technology. OCLC 59823134. Archived (PDF) from the original on September 11, 2022.
