= Thomas de Waal =

British journalist (born 1966)

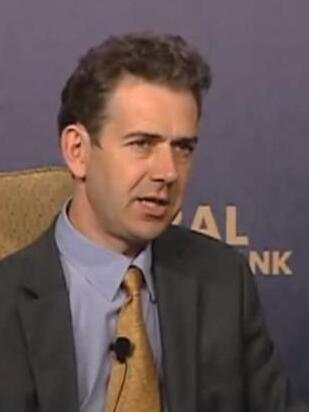
- De Waal at the Carnegie Endowment for International Peace, Washington DC, 20 June 2013
- Born: 1966 (age 59–60); Nottingham, UK
- Education: Balliol College, Oxford
- Occupation: Journalist
- Notable work: Black Garden (2003)

Thomas Patrick Lowndes de Waal (born 1966) is a British journalist and writer on the Caucasus. He is a senior fellow at Carnegie Europe. He is best known for his 2003 book Black Garden: Armenia and Azerbaijan Through Peace and War.

== Life and career ==
Thomas De Waal was born in Nottingham, England. He is the son of Esther Aline (née Lowndes-Moir), a writer on religion, and Anglican priest Victor de Waal. De Waal graduated from Balliol College, Oxford, with a First Class Degree in Modern Languages (Russian and Modern Greek).

De Waal is the co-author of Chechnya: Calamity in the Caucasus (New York, 1998) and author of Black Garden: Armenia and Azerbaijan Through Peace and War (New York, 2003).

As a journalist, de Waal has reported for, amongst others, the BBC World Service, the Moscow Times, and The Times. He was a Caucasus editor at the Institute for War and Peace Reporting (IWPR) in London until December 2008, and later a research associate with the peace-building NGO Conciliation Resources.

From 2010 to 2015, de Waal worked as a Senior Associate in the Russia and Eurasia Program at the Carnegie Endowment for International Peace, specialising primarily in the South Caucasus region. Currently he is a senior fellow with Carnegie Europe, specializing in Eastern Europe and the Caucasus region.

In his position as Senior Fellow for Carnegie Europe, de Waal has written extensively on the Caucasus, with commentary on ongoing events, on breakaway regions, and also larger publications on the region, including books introducing the Caucasus region, and, in The Great Catastrophe (2015), on the aftermath and politics of the Armenian Genocide, also highlighting efforts by Armenians, Kurds, and Turks to come to terms with this history. In 2014, de Waal had provided the introduction to Two Close Peoples, Two Distant Neighbours, a book collecting the major writings on Armenian-Turkish relations by Hrant Dink.

Next to the Carnegie Europe website, his analysis has been published in Foreign Policy, Foreign Affairs, and various other outlets. Like other prominent commentators on the region, De Waal has been criticized for some of the analysis he has put forward.

In 2023, de Waal published a translation of Osip Mandelstam's Tristia.

In 2021, he was criticised in an open letter addressed to Carnegie Europe and signed by fourteen scholars, including Henry Theriault, Bedross Der Matossian, Elyse Semerdjian, and Marc A. Mamigonian for his article "What Next After the U.S. Recognition of the Armenian Genocide?", stating that its "inaccuracies and minimizations have ... contributed to denial of the Armenian Genocide".

== Work on Russia and Chechnya ==
De Waal has repeatedly worked on and reported from Chechnya.

In 2006 the Ministry of Foreign Affairs of Russia denied an entry visa to De Waal, who was due to attend in Moscow the presentation of a Russian version of his book on the conflict in Nagorno-Karabakh, citing a law that says a visa can be refused "in the aims of ensuring state security." De Waal believes that his visa denial was retaliation for his critical reporting about the Russian war in Chechnya.

De Waal wrote the introduction to Anna Politkovskaya's first book in English, A Dirty War (2004), which describes the atrocities and abuses of that conflict.

== Other biographical background ==
De Waal is the brother of Africa specialist Alex de Waal, barrister John de Waal, and potter and writer Edmund de Waal.

Through his grandmother, Elisabeth de Waal (née Ephrussi), Thomas de Waal is related to the Ephrussi family who were wealthy Jewish bankers and art patrons in pre-World War II Europe and whose fortunes started in 19th-century Odessa. He had done some research on the family's Russian branch, and helped with the research of his family's history by his brother Edmund de Waal, which led to the publication of the book The Hare with Amber Eyes.

== Bibliography ==
- Chechnya: Calamity in the Caucasus. NYU Press. 1999. ISBN 0814731325.
- Black Garden: Armenia and Azerbaijan Through Peace and War. New York University Press. 2003. ISBN 0814719449.
- The Caucasus: An Introduction. Oxford University Press. 2010. ISBN 978-0195399769. (2nd edition, 2018)
- Great Catastrophe: Armenians and Turks in the Shadow of Genocide. Oxford University Press. 2015. ISBN 978-0199350698.
- Beyond Frozen Conflict: Scenarios for the Separatist Disputes of Eastern Europe. Center for European Policy Studies. 2020. ISBN 978-1538144176.
- Tristia, by Osip Mandelstam: Translated from the Russian by Thomas de Waal. Arc Publications. 2023. ISBN 9781910345931.
