= Stepan Zatikyan =

Soviet dissident and Armenian politician (1946–1979)

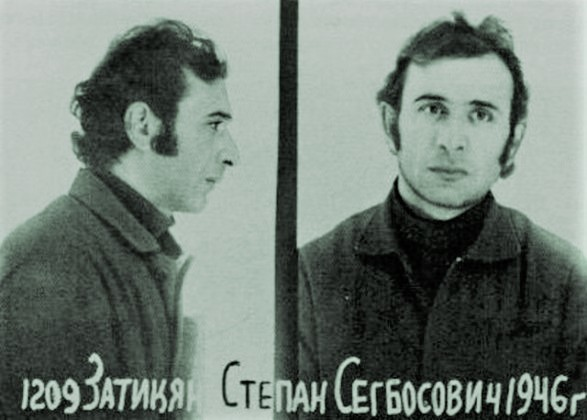
- Zatikyan's mugshot

Personal details
- Born: June 20, 1946 Yerevan, Armenian SSR, Soviet Union
- Died: January 29, 1979 (aged 32)
- Resting place: Unknown
- Party: National United Party (1966-1979)

Stepan Seghbosi Zatikyan (Armenian: Ստեփան Սեղբոսի Զատիկյան; June 20, 1946 - January, 1979) was a Soviet dissident and one of the founders of the Armenian NUP (National United Party).

== Early life ==
Zatikyan was born on June 20, 1946, in Yerevan to a family of craftsmen; his parents were refugees from the Western Armenia. He received his primary education at the Mikayel Nalbandian Secondary School in Yerevan, graduating in 1963 with a gold medal. In the same year he entered the Faculty of Chemistry of the Yerevan Polytechnic Institute. Zatikyan's life was marked by the mass demonstration on April 24, 1965 in Lenin (now the Republic) Square; the protestors condemned the 1915 Armenian Genocide and raised the issue of the return of Armenian lands. Encouraged by these ideas, the next day Zatikyan went to the city pantheon to lay flowers at the grave of the Armenian composer Komitas. He was arrested by police near the grave and detained for fifteen days. There he met Haykaz Khachatryan, who was also arrested near Komitas's grave.

== National United Party ==
Eventually Zatikyan and Haykaz Khachatryan agreed to work together on a common ideological basis. Some time later, they were joined by another young man, Shahen Harutyunyan (Shant Harutyunyan's father); the three of them formed the National United Party (NUP) on April 24, 1966. The organization was headed by Khachatryan and the governing body of the party was the General Council, one of whose members was Zatikyan. The NUP developed a charter and an action plan, the texts of which were written by Zatikyan.

The first members of the organization took an oath of allegiance to the party's ideas at the Armenian Genocide Memorial in Yerevan. In April 1967, on genocide commemoration day, the NUP distributed its first leaflet entitled Paros (lighthouse in Armenian), and on October 19–20 of the same year, it also distributed the four-page Paros newspaper with the following articles: "The new ones are coming out", "To the Armenian people", "Armenia under the yoke", "The Armenian question", "The international situation today", "The facts are ruthless", "What is the language of the nation", "A couple of words." In addition, Zatikyan had written critical articles on the reality of life in the Soviet Union, such as "The Essence of the Soviet Economy" or "On the other side of the curtain"․ The articles were about Armenian independence from the Soviet Union and about the annexation of Armenia by Russia. Zatikyan distributed Paros on the campus of the Polytechnic Institute of Yerevan State University. It was significantly different from the leaflets and newspapers before it in Armenian and Soviet circles. This was a new phenomenon for Soviet authorities, but also for dissidents in the region.

The structure of the organization also included a youth branch. Within the NUP it was called "Shant" (lightning in Armenian). Khachatryan and Zatikyan put seventeen-year-old Paruyr Hayrikyan at the head of this cell. Several members of the NUP would later go on to assume more public profiles: Movses Gorgisyan, RPA founder Ashot Navasardyan, Prime Minister of Armenia Andranik Margaryan, Azat Arshakyan, and others.

== First arrest ==
The existence of the NUP was known everywhere where the anti-Soviet movement began to gain momentum. The newspaper was banned and declared anti-Soviet. Not only the authors of Paros but also the readers were persecuted. The NUP members managed to publish only two issues of the newspaper.

Arrests of NUP leaders began on July 9, 1968; Stepan Zatikyan was in his fifth year at the university at that time. During the interrogation on July 10, Stepan Zatikyan informed the investigator that he began a hunger strike due to his opposition of the detention conditions.

He was charged with Articles 65.1 and 67 of the Criminal Code of the Armenian SSR (anti-Soviet agitation, participation in an anti-Soviet organization), The Supreme Court of the Armenian SSR sentenced Zatikyan to four years in a correctional labor colony. His first years of imprisonment were spent in the political camp of Mordovia. Zatikyan continued his active political activity there. In early July 1970, he and twenty young political prisoners went on a six-day hunger strike to protest the crackdown. For that action he was sent to Vladimir prison. In November 1971, Zatikyan, along with other political prisoners, went on a hunger strike in Vladimir prison. They protested against the KGB's practice of collecting information on political prisoners, as well as the submission of prisoners' statements to state bodies as anti-Soviet documents, criminalizing them and blackmailing them.

After his release at the end of his term, Zatikyan was placed under administrative supervision. He worked at the Yerevan Electromechanical Plant as a transformer assembler. He did not participate in social activities, considering emigration to be the most reasonable way out for himself and for other Armenians who had served their sentences. In 1975 Zatikyan sent a statement to the Supreme Soviet in which he renounced Soviet citizenship and asked to be given the opportunity to leave for any non-socialist country. Together with the application, he also sent his passport. Zatikyan did not receive an answer, and the passport was sent to the KGB.

== 1977 Moscow bombings ==
On January 8, 1977, an explosion took place in the Moscow metro, killing seven people and injuring thirty-seven others (the number of victims and injured became known only after the verdict). The day after the explosion, the politician and academician Andrei Sakharov expressed suspicions that the incident may have been organized by the KGB and used against members of a dissident movement.

On October 28, 1977, Stepan Zatikyan, Hakob Stepanyan, and Zaven Baghdasaryan were arrested on suspicion of carrying out the explosion. Stepan Zatikyan was introduced as the organizer of the action. The preliminary investigation and the trial were held in top secret conditions; even the relatives of the defendants were not present at the verdict. During the meeting with his family after the verdict (the only time since the moment of his arrest) Zatikyan's brother took him aside from the women - his mother and wife - and asked if he was guilty of a crime. Stepan Zatikyan replied:

"․․․I’m not guilty of anything, except for making my children orphans.․․". He also added: “In the whole 15 months I didn’t say a word to them".

The death sentence was announced on January 24, 1979, and a few days later - on January 30, it was carried out.

Unaware of the execution, Andrei Sakharov sent a letter to Leonid Brezhnev demanding that the verdict be overturned pending a new trial. He alleged Zatikyan would have an alibi showing he was not in Moscow at the time of the bombing.

Sakharov did not receive an official answer from Brezhnev, but he was attacked by the people, particularly by the relatives of the victims.

On 1 February 1979 the Moscow Helsinki Group’s Document No. 81 questioned the legality and impartiality of the verdict due to the absence of the public.

Some episodes from the trial can be found on the Internet. In one episode, Stepan Zatikyan says. "I have stated several times that ... I do not need any lawyer, ... today Armenia has absolutely no benefit from the Russians and Russia... Guys, goodbye. Tell people that these were Stepan's last words - revenge, revenge and revenge again".

From the point of view of the KGB, it was very reasonable to choose the Armenian National Movement, as Armenia was the only state in the USSR where there was a party that had set itself the goal of leaving the USSR. This facilitated the discrediting of the Armenian national movement within and outside the USSR by presenting it as a force using terrorist methods.

== Personal life ==
In 1974 Zatikyan married Paruyr Hayrikyan's sister Sona. They had two children, a daughter, Hasmik, and a son, Vrezh. They currently reside in the U.S. His son Vrezh Zatikyan was also involved in politics in Armenia.

== See also ==
- 1977 Moscow bombings
- National United Party (Armenia)
- Paruyr Hayrikyan
