= Hayrikyan =

Hayrikyan (Armenian: Հայրիկեան, also transliterated as Hayrikian, Ayrikyan, Airikian) is an Armenian family name, literally meaning "descendant of Hayrik".

- Paruyr Hayrikyan, Armenian politician
- Abraham Hayrikian, Armenian turkologist, director of Ardi college, member of Armenian National Assembly - A victim of the Armenian Genocide
