= Army of Independence =

Army of Independence Անկախության բանակ
- Founded: 1989
- Dissolved: 1990
- Headquarters: Yerevan, Armenian SSR

The Army of Independence (Armenian: Անկախության բանակ, romanized: Ankakhut’yan banak) was an Armenian armed group that was active in the period leading up to Armenia becoming an independent state in 1991.

== History ==
The Army of Independence was founded in late 1989 by members of the Union for National Self-Determination, including Ashot Navasardyan, Movses Gorgisyan, Azat Arshakyan, and Razmik Markosyan. The declared goal of the Army of Independence was to "protect the process of Armenia becoming an independent country", and to this end it engaged in clashes with the Soviet authorities in Armenia, as well as with Azerbaijani forces on the Armenia–Azerbaijan border and in Nagorno-Karabakh. Soon after the group's founding, one of its founders, Movses Gorgisyan, was killed during a battle with Azerbaijani forces near Yeraskh.

In February 1990, the Army of Independence participated in the creation of a defense coordination committee that was meant to coordinate the activities of the various armed militias in Armenia.

On 23 March 1990, the Army of Independence cut ties with the Union for National Self-Determination and became an independent group. Several leaders of the Army of Independence joined the ranks of the Republican Party of Armenia, which was founded by Ashot Navasardyan on 2 April 1990. The Army of Independence created a new military council with Navasardyan as supreme commander and Leonid Azgaldyan as general commander. By December 1989, the group had units in Yerevan, Etchmiadzin, Artashat, Armavir, Ararat, Masis, Charentsavan, Kamo, Vardenis, Vanadzor, Ijevan, Tashir, and Nagorno-Karabakh.

On 27 May 1990 the Army of Independence prevented the Soviet Army from entering Yerevan at Yerevan railway station.

The Army of Independence was dissolved in August 1990. Most of its members went on to fight in the First Nagorno-Karabakh War and participate in Armenia's political life.

== See also ==
- History of Armenia
- Politics of Armenia
