= Victor Louis (journalist) =

Soviet journalist

Victor Yevgenyevich Louis
- Born: Vitaly Yevgenyevich Lui; 5 February 1928; Moscow, Russian SFSR, Soviet Union
- Died: 18 July 1992 (aged 64); London, UK
- Other name: Vitaly Lui
- Occupation: Journalism
- Known for: Disinformation operations

Victor Louis (5 February 1928 – 18 July 1992) was a Soviet journalist who had close work connections with the senior levels of the USSR KGB. He was used by the Soviet government as an informal channel of communication and for subtle disinformation operations in the Cold War. Viewed as an agent provocateur of the secret police, he was hated and boycotted by the Moscow intelligentsia.

== Biography ==
Born Vitaly Yevgenyevich Lui (Луи) in Moscow, he changed his name to Victor Louis in the 1950s, when he began writing for the Western press. His Russian mother died the week of his birth; his father came from a well-off (prior to the 1917 revolution) German (Prussian) family that lived in Moscow.

Starting from 1944, Lui managed to land a series of low-level support staff positions with foreign embassies in Moscow, which got him into trouble with the NKVD; he was arrested in Leningrad around 1946 and later tried and sentenced to 25 years of labour camps on espionage charges (Article 58). He did time in Inta.

He was released around 1956 and started co-operating closely with the KGB. His first official employment was with the CBS News Moscow bureau, where, as his own account has it, he gave his boss, Daniel Schorr, a tip, allegedly based on an article in Vechernyaya Moskva that reported the cancellation of a Hungarian ballet trip to Moscow, about the imminent Soviet invasion of Hungary in November 1956. His next job was as an assistant to Edmund Stevens of Look magazine.

Louis wrote for The Evening News until 1980, and then for the Sunday Express. As he would have news nobody else had, occasionally he made world headlines. As a journalist and a source of information for other foreign correspondents in the USSR, he was considered to purvey the western world with information that the Soviet régime would consider interesting to deliver, without committing itself to it.

His first sensational journalistic scoop was breaking the news through The Evening News—albeit cautiously worded—about the imminent ouster of Khrushchev in October 1964. In his autobiographical accounts, Louis claimed that the report was based solely on his analysis of circumstantial evidence such as the disappearance of a big portrait of Khrushchev in the centre of Moscow and Khrushchev's name being expunged from Soviet media news reports, even though he admitted that the initial hint had been given to him by his "friend" who worked at the USSR Broadcasting Committee (Radiokomitet).

According to his own account, Louis had a series of personal meetings with the KGB chairman Yuri Andropov from the late 1960s till the mid-1970s. Louis claimed that Andropov personally gave him the go-ahead when, having overheard Andropov's telephone conversation with Leonid Brezhnev, he volunteered to go to Chile in the wake of the military junta's coup d'état in the autumn of 1973 to ascertain that Luis Corvalán, the general secretary of the Communist Party of Chile, was alive.

Louis reported that the Soviet Union might be considering a preventive nuclear attack against China as well as the information about the Moscow metro bombing of 1977; he ascribed the latter to dissidents, which gave the authorities a pretext for a harsh crackdown. In 1968, a few months before the publication of Twenty Letters to a Friend by Joseph Stalin's daughter Svetlana Alliluyeva (who had defected two years prior), Louis brought out the KGB's unauthorized copy in Germany to damp the sensation. He was instrumental in smuggling both Khrushchev's memoirs and Aleksandr Solzhenitsyn's Cancer Ward to the West, although in the latter case he is believed to have had the aim of compromising the writer at home.

He had an opulent dacha at Bakovka west of Moscow, "where he lived like a millionaire"; he also had a series of expensive cars, including the makes of Porsche, Bentley and Mercedes-Benz, some of them vintage.

From 1965, he and his wife ran a lucrative 'hard-currency' business publishing the directory Information Moscow for foreigners in Moscow.

Until 1982, Louis' KGB overseer was KGB Major General Vyacheslav Kevorkov, who in 2010 published a book in Russia about Victor Louis' life that he claimed was based on the latter's oral accounts to him shortly before death. According to Kevorkov's 2010 interview, he would normally meet Louis at safe houses (never at the KGB headquarters at Lubyanka) and give him assignments directly from Yuri Andropov; Kevorkov claimed that Louis never was a KGB officer, or a staff agent. He also noted that Louis was not good at writing in any language and his articles were edited by his English wife. The book, Victor Louis : Man with the Legend (Виктор Луи : человек с легендой), is written in first person as a quasi-biography (on behalf of Louis), in a fictional style, without reference to any documents.

He died of a heart attack in London on 18 July 1992, a few months after the demise of the USSR; his cremated remains were interred in the Moscow Vagankovo Cemetery.

He was survived by his wife (since November 1958) – UK-born Jennifer Margaret, née Statham, a former nanny to a diplomat at the British Embassy in Moscow and three sons by her: Anthony, Michael, and Nicholas.

== His books ==
- (with Jennifer Louis) A Motorists guide to the Soviet Union. Pergammon. 1967.
- (with Jennifer Louis) Complete Guide to the Soviet Union. London, Michael Joseph, 1976. ISBN 0718110773.
- Sport in the Soviet Union. Elsevier. 1980. ISBN 0-08-024506-4.
- Collet’s Guide to Moscow, Leningrad, Kiev. Collets. 1990.
- The Moscow Street Atlas. Collets. 1990. ISBN 0-569-09258-2.
- Complete Guide to the Soviet Union. 1991. ISBN 0-312-05837-3.
