= Leonid Azgaldyan =

Armenian physicist

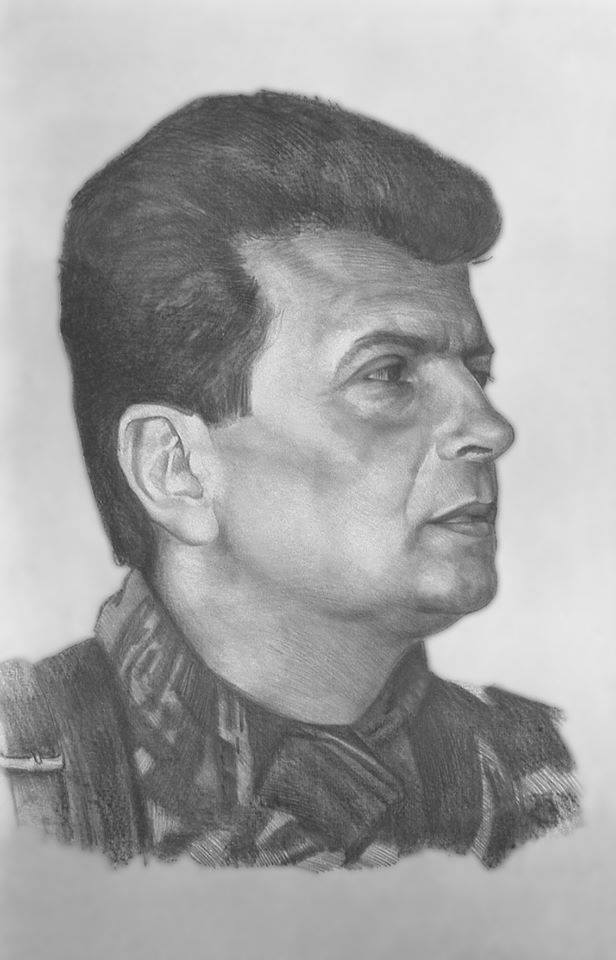
- Born: 22 November 1942; Tbilisi, Soviet Georgia
- Died: 21 June 1992 (aged 49); Martakert, Nagorno-Karabakh
- Military career
- Allegiance: Armenia
- Service years: 1990–1992
- Awards: Combat Cross of the First Degree; Hero of Artsakh
- Website: azgaldyan.am

Leonid Rubeni Azgaldyan (Armenian: Լեոնիդ Ռուբենի Ազգալդյան; 22 November 1942 – 21 June 1992) was an Armenian physicist who rose to prominence as a military leader during the First Nagorno-Karabakh War. He is best known as one of the founders and commander of a large special operations force known as the Liberation Army (Armenian: Ազատագրական Բանակ).

== Biography ==
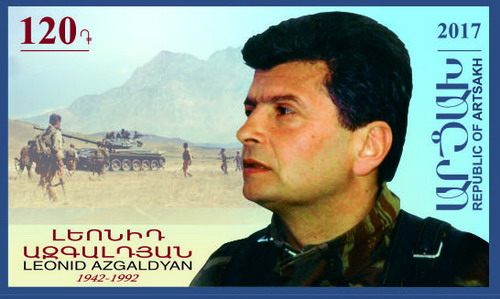
Azgaldyan on a 2017 stamp of Nagorno-Karabakh

Leonid Azgaldyan was born on 22 November 1942 in Tbilisi, Georgian SSR to the family of Ruben Azgaldyan, who was originally from Kamo (now Gavar), Armenian SSR. In 1959 he graduated from Yerevan School after A. Mravyan, and in 1960 he was admitted into the Physics Department of Moscow State University. He later transferred and graduated with honors from the same department at Yerevan State University, specializing in radiophysics. After graduating, he worked in various spheres of the Soviet economy, focusing mainly on planning methodology, automation of government systems and automated systems for scientific research.

Leonid Azgaldyan was one of the pioneers of the Karabakh movement and a key military strategist. He was a commander of the Army of Independence, an armed group founded in 1989 that engaged in violent clashes with the Soviet and Soviet Azerbaijani authorities in the Armenian SSR and the Nagorno-Karabakh Autonomous Oblast, until its dissolution in August 1990. From February 1990, he planned and organized the defense of several regions of Armenia and Nagorno-Karabakh. He was especially instrumental in the defense of Vardenis, organizing the first offensive against Azerbaijani military outposts in Nyuvadi and preventing the Soviet army from entering Yerevan after clashes between Armenian militias and Soviet forces at Sovetashen and Yerevan railway station. He later moved to Nagorno-Karabakh and participated in the battles of Getashen, Shahumian and Martakert. In June 1991, together with Hovsep Hovsepyan he co-founded and commanded the Liberation Army special operations force, whose declared goal was to preserve the self-determination and defense of the local Armenian population of Nagorno-Karabakh.

Azgaldyan was killed on 21 June 1992 in Tonashen village of Martakert district, Nagorno-Karabakh. He was posthumously awarded with the Order of the Combat Cross of the First Degree and, in 2019, the title Hero of Artsakh.
