= National United Party (Armenia) =

Armenian political party

National United Party Ազգային Միացյալ Կուսակցություն
- Leader: Haykaz Khachatryan (founder); Paruyr Hayrikyan (1973–1987)
- Founded: 1966
- Dissolved: 1987
- Succeeded by: Union for National Self-Determination
- Headquarters: Yerevan, Armenian SSR
- Ideology: Armenian nationalism Liberal democracy

The National United Party (Armenian: Ազգային Միացյալ Կուսակցություն; Russian: Национальная объединённая партия) was an Armenian underground political party in the Soviet Union. It operated from 1966 until 1987, when it was renamed Union for National Self-Determination (UNSD), which became the first democratic party in the USSR.

== History ==
Since the early 1960s, the Soviet regime had to confront pockets of dissident thinking. The monopoly of the Communist party was questioned by people who thought in terms of freedom of thought and speech. Painter Haykaz Khachatryan (1920-1989) and a group of Armenians held a demonstration on 24 April 1965 near the tomb of Komitas in Yerevan. They were arrested, but released a few days later due to lack of evidence. The National United Party (NUP) was founded on 24 April 1966, by painter Haykaz Khachatryan, Stepan Zatikyan and Shahen Harutyunyan. The party issued and distributed the first issue of its clandestine periodical Paros (Phare) in October 1967. When the founders were imprisoned in 1968, Paruyr Hayrikyan became head of the party.

The main goals of the NUP were the independence of Soviet Armenia, the establishment of democracy, and the elimination of the consequences of the Armenian genocide. Party members were to follow the program of the party, entitled "For the Nation and the Homeland." Any person aged sixteen and above, who accepted the program, could become a party member. In 1973, the National United Party re-elected Hayrikyan as its president. Hayrikyan wrote his political program, "The Road to Independence through Referendum Strategy," in the same year. After he was arrested in 1974, he continued clandestinely to lead the organization. On his return to Armenia in August 1987, Hayrikyan founded a successor party to the NUP, the Union for National Self-Determination.

Many prominent figures of independent Armenia, including Ashot Navasardyan, Movses Gorgisyan and Andranik Margaryan, were former members of the National United Party.

== See also ==
- Programs of political parties in Armenia
- Politics of Armenia

== Links ==
- Foundation of the National United Party (April 24, 1966)
