= Union for National Self-Determination =

Union for National Self-Determination Ազգային ինքնորոշում միավորում
- Leader: Paruyr Hayrikyan
- Founded: 1987
- Preceded by: National United Party
- Headquarters: Yerevan
- Ideology: Liberalism; Pro-Europeanism; Atlanticism
- National affiliation: National Democratic Pole (supportive); Free Homeland Alliance (2021)
- Colors: Black
- National Assembly: 0 / 107

Website
- www.aim.am

Union for National Self-Determination (Armenian: Ազգային ինքնորոշում միավորում, romanized: Azgayin ink’noroshum miavorum) is an Armenian political party. It was founded in 1987 by Paruyr Hayrikyan, a Soviet dissident seeking independence for Armenia.

== History ==
The party was founded in 1987 as the successor of the defunct National United Party.

In late 1989, a number of members of the executive council of the party, including Movses Gorgisyan and Ashot Navasardyan, founded the Army of Independence, an armed group aimed at achieving Armenia's independence which engaged in violent clashes with the Soviet authorities in the Armenian SSR and the Nagorno-Karabakh Autonomous Oblast. In February 1990, the Army of Independence broke off from the Union of National Self-Determination, and several of the former's members founded the Republican Party of Armenia. The Army of Independence was dissolved on 23 August 1990.

The party nominated Hayrikyan as its candidate in the 1991 Armenian presidential election. Hayrikyan came in second place, with 7.2% of the vote.

Following the 1995 Armenian parliamentary election, the party gained 3 seats within the National Assembly. However, the party lost all political representation in the National Assembly after the 1999 Armenian parliamentary election, gaining just 2.28% of the popular vote.

The party nominated Hayrikyan as its candidate in the 2013 Armenian presidential election. Hayrikyan came in fourth place, receiving 1.23% of the vote.

Following a long absence from politics, Paruyr Hayrikyan announced his intentions to create a "democratic alliance" with other liberal pro-democratic parties. Prior to the 2017 Armenian parliamentary election, the Union for National Self-Determination requested to join the Way Out Alliance, however their request was never responded too.

Despite the set-back, Hayrikyan confirmed that the Union for National Self-Determination will participate in future key elections, however the party did not participate in the 2018 Armenian parliamentary election.

In May 2020, some key members of the party endorsed the National Democratic Pole alliance.

The Union for National Self-Determination confirmed that it would participate in the 2021 Armenian parliamentary elections as part of the Free Homeland Alliance. Following the election, the Free Homeland Alliance received just 0.32% of the popular vote, failing to win any seats in the National Assembly. The party currently acts as an extra-parliamentary force.

== Activities ==
In April 2016, Paruyr Hayrikyan held a press conference with Tigran Khzmalyan, leader of the European Party of Armenia. Both leaders announced the creation of a mass-petition to be signed by citizens calling on the government to give up cooperation with Russia and deepen their ties with European institutions.

In June 2019, during a press conference, Hayrikyan urged Prime Minister Nikol Pashinyan to strengthen democratic values in Armenia.

On 30 November 2019, Hayrikyan called on the government of Armenia to recognize the Ukrainian Holodomor as a genocide during a speech at the Ukrainian Embassy in Yerevan.

In November 2020, the Union for National Self-Determination held a rally in central Yerevan, along with the European Party of Armenia and the Sasna Tsrer Pan-Armenian Party. The three parties called for the creation of a truly sovereign Armenia by ending Russian political occupation and avoiding clinging to Russia, while aligning closer with Europe.

On 22 December 2020, the Union for National Self-Determination, the Conservative Party and the Democratic Homeland Party held a joint meeting discussing the political situation in Armenia.

On 15 April 2021, the party signed a joint declaration with eight other political parties calling on the President of Armenia to ensure democracy and the Constitution of Armenia is upheld in the country during the 2020–2021 Armenian protests.

On 21 February 2023, a conference of democratic forces including opposition political parties and civil society took place in Yerevan. Delegates from the Union for National Self-Determination, National Democratic Pole, European Party of Armenia, Hanrapetutyun Party, and over a dozen representatives from Armenian civil society organizations participated. Members of the conference called on the Government of Armenia to announce its withdrawal from the CSTO and Eurasian Union and to realign Armenia's military integration with the United States and the West. In addition, the participants signed a declaration calling on the government to immediately submit an EU membership bid for Armenia.

== Ideology ==
The party believes that the Caucasus region, including Armenia, should move towards European integration as well as increasing integration with Western countries. The party has maintained for 15 years the position that the integration of Armenia and Azerbaijan into the European Union would make the Nagorno-Karabakh conflict senseless, and therefore EU accession should be pursued as a lasting solution to the conflict.

== See also ==
- Programs of political parties in Armenia
- Politics of Armenia
