= Ashot Navasardyan =

Armenian politician

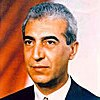
Ashot Navasardyan

Ashot Tsolaki Navasardyan (Armenian: Աշոտ Ցոլակի Նավասարդյան; March 28, 1950 – November 3, 1997) was an Armenian politician and military commander who founded the Republican Party of Armenia.

Navasardyan was born in Yerevan and graduated from the Faculty of Law of Yerevan State University. From 1968 to 1990, he was a member of the underground National Unity Party and its successor, the Union for National Self-Determination, which sought to achieve Armenia's secession from the Soviet Union. He was imprisoned several times by the Soviet authorities for his dissident activities, serving a total of 12 years in prisons.

Navasardyan was an advocate of the ideas of the Armenian military leader and nationalist thinker Garegin Nzhdeh. With the rise of the Karabakh movement and the Armenian independence movement, he and other members of the Union for National Self-Determination founded the Army of Independence, an armed group that engaged in violent clashes with Soviet authorities in Armenia and with Azerbaijani forces on the border with Azerbaijan and in Nagorno-Karabakh during the First Nagorno-Karabakh War. Navasardyan was elected the supreme commander of the Army of Independence. In 1990, he founded the Republican Party of Armenia, which he led until his death. He was elected to the Supreme Soviet of Armenia in the 1990 elections and to the National Assembly of Armenia in the 1995 parliamentary elections.

Navasardyan died from a heart attack on November 3, 1997. He is buried at Yerablur military cemetery.
