= Paruyr Hayrikyan =

Armenian politician and dissident

- Պարոյր Հայրիկեան
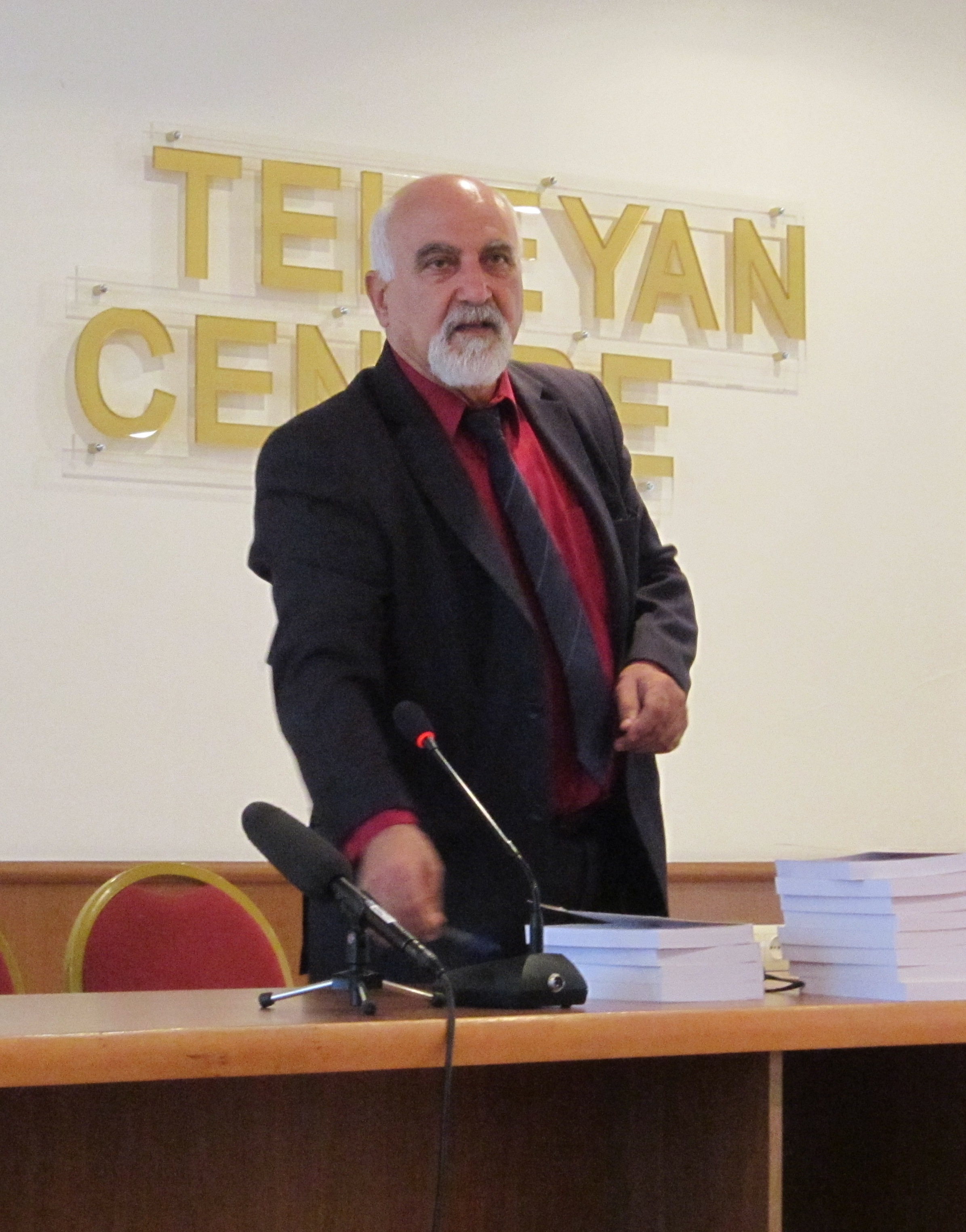
- Hayrikyan in 2016

Personal details
- Born: 5 July 1949 (age 76) Nubarashen, Yerevan, Armenian SSR, Soviet Union
- Party: National United Party (1966–1987); Union for National Self-Determination (1987–)
- Occupation: Politician, composer
- Website: hayrikyan.com

Paruyr Arshaviri Hayrikyan (Note: Traditional Armenian orthography: Պարոյր Արշաւիրի Հայրիկեան; Reformed orthography: Պարույր Արշավիրի Հայրիկյան.) (born July 5, 1949) is an Armenian politician and former Soviet dissident. He was an early member and leader of the National United Party (NUP), which sought Armenia's independence from the Soviet Union. He spent a total of about 18 years in Soviet correctional facilities for his dissident activities and was eventually expelled from the Soviet Union in 1988, although he was allowed to return two years later. Since Armenia gained its independence in 1991, Hayrikyan has been active in Armenian politics as the leader of the Union for National Self-Determination, the successor party to the NUP, and took part in presidential elections in 1991 and 2013, surviving an assassination attempt during the latter. He is also a writer and accomplished composer, having authored several popular patriotic Armenian songs.

== Biography ==
Paruyr Hayrikyan was born in Nubarashen (formerly Sovetashen), a suburb of Yerevan, in 1949. His father Arshavir was born in Constantinople and immigrated to Soviet Armenia in 1946, while his mother Zaruhi was born in Krasnodar to a family originally from Van. While he was still in secondary school in Nubarashen, Hayrikyan established the Union of Armenian Youth. In 1966 Hayrikyan was admitted to Yerevan Polytechnic Institute, where he attended night classes while working as an electrician in a factory in Nubarashen. In 1967, he became a member of Armenia's underground National United Party (NUP). As a member of the NUP, Hayrikyan founded a new youth organization called Shant ("Lightning"). After NUP founders Haykaz Khachatryan, Stepan Zatikyan and Shahen Harutyunyan were arrested by the KGB in July 1968, Hayrikyan became the effective head of the NUP. He managed to establish several branches of the NUP and to publish 5,000 copies of the party newspaper Erkounk ("Torments"). On March 29, 1969, Hayrikyan was arrested by the KGB and sentenced to 4 years in prison the next year, which he served in a special camp for political prisoners in Mordovia.

Hayrikyan returned to Armenia from prison in 1973, but was arrested again in February 1974 and sentenced to seven years imprisonment and three years exile. In 1977, he began a hunger strike in prison, demanding the release of all NUP members, the legalization of the party, and an independence referendum for Armenia, which was following by new criminal charges against him. In 1984, Hayrikyan was sent into internal exile in Ust-Kut in the Irkutsk Oblast, where he remained until early 1987. He spent a total of about 18 years in Soviet prisons, including more than 300 days in solitary confinement. In fall 1987, Hayrikyan returned to Yerevan and founded the Union for National Self-Determination as a successor party to the NUP. The party's declared goal was the independence of Armenia from the Soviet Union by means of national referendum.

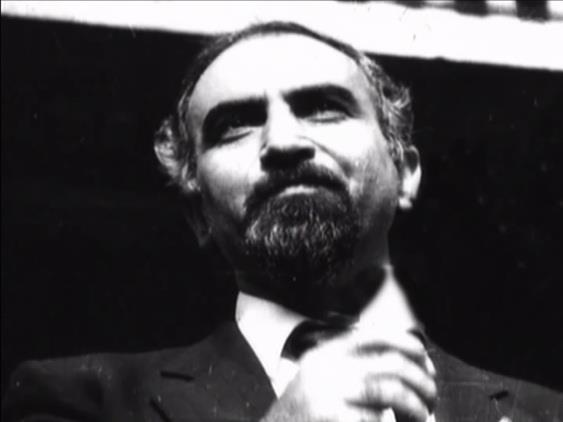
Paruyr Hayrikyan in 1990

In 1988, Hayrikyan was stripped of his Soviet citizenship and exiled to Ethiopia after his accusations that the Soviet leadership instigated the Sumgait pogroms of Armenian population in Azerbaijan. In Addis Ababa Hayrikyan applied for and was granted asylum by the United States, where he remained for some time. During this period, Paruyr Hayrikyan acquired wide popularity, and was elected Chairman of the International Coordinating Center of the National Democratic Movement of the USSR, also known as Democracy and Independence. On May 20, 1990, while he was still in exile in the USA, he was elected a member of the Armenian Supreme Council. In 1990, following pressure from a group of United States senators led by Bob Dole, Mikhail Gorbachev restored Hayrikyan's citizenship and allowed him to return. Since then Hayrikyan has taken an active part in Armenian political life. As a candidate for 1991 Armenian presidential election he was ranked second with 7% votes. Hayrikyan's supporters claimed that there were violations during the campaign, including an act of violence committed against him and his supporters in the village of Paravakar (Tavush Province). These charges were subsequently judged to be true by an Armenian court.

Since 1992, as an appointed Commandant of Goris, Hayrikyan took measures to ensure the efficient defense and organizing settlements of refugees in the Syunik and Artsakh. In 1995 he was re-elected to the Armenian Parliament as a leader of the UNSD faction. In the late 1990s Hayrikyan served as an Advisor to the President of Armenia, and from 1998 to 2003 he worked as ombudsman (Chairman of the Human Rights Committee) of Armenia.

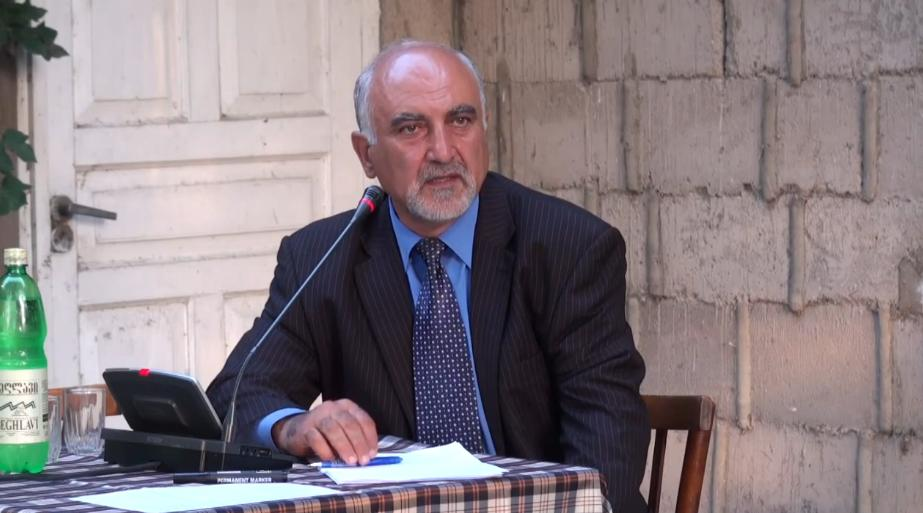
Paruyr Hayrikyan in 2011

On 31 January 2013, he was shot and wounded during his bid for the presidency in 2013. The assassination attempt was organized by Vardan Sedrakyan, another candidate in the 2013 election, and carried out by two of his associates. Sedrakyan was convicted to 14 years imprisonment for organizing the attempt on Hayrikyan's life. According to official results, Hayrikyan ranked fourth in the election. He took part in the June–July 2015 anti-government protests, but his appearance among the demonstrators in Yerevan with a European Union flag was met with whistles and criticism.

Hayrikyan wrote the autobiographical novel On a Quest of the Light in 2001. In this book Hayrikyan presents "his experiences as a freedom fighter through a letter to the love of his youth whom he lost during his eighteen years in prison and exile". Besides to the dissident movement in Armenia, the book also discuss dissident activities in other Soviet republics. In 2015 the book was translated into English and published in the United States.

== Political activities ==
The National United Party was founded in 1966 on April 24 by Haykaz Khachatryan, Stephan Zatikyan and Shahen Harutyunyan. When the founders of the party were imprisoned in 1968, Hayrikyan became the head of the National United Party (NUP). The main goals of the NUP were the independence of Soviet Armenia and Soviet Russia and the elimination of the consequences of the Armenian Genocide (1915–1923). In 1973, the National United Party reelected Hayrikyan as its president. In the same year, Hayrikyan wrote his seminal political pamphlet "The Road to Independence through Referendum Strategy." On February 12, 1974, he was again arrested. During the trial Hayrikyan conducted himself as a consistent supporter of independence and civic rights. According to Jewish writer Mikhail Heifetz, not only Armenians, but also many other Soviet dissidents were among the members and supporters of NUP (Viacheslav Chornovil, Vasyl Stus, Eduard Kuznetsov, and others). On November 22, 1974, after the Hayrikyan's new trial, Andrei Sakharov signed an Open letter supporting Hayrikyan.

Union for National Self-Determination party was established by Paruyr Hayrikyan in September 1987. Union for National Self-Determination (UNSD) was the first openly operating democratic organization within the territory of the USSR. UNSD published the "Independence" weekly newspaper starting from October 24 of 1987. The "Independence" weekly newspaper was the first alternative political periodical in the Soviet Union.

== Personal life ==
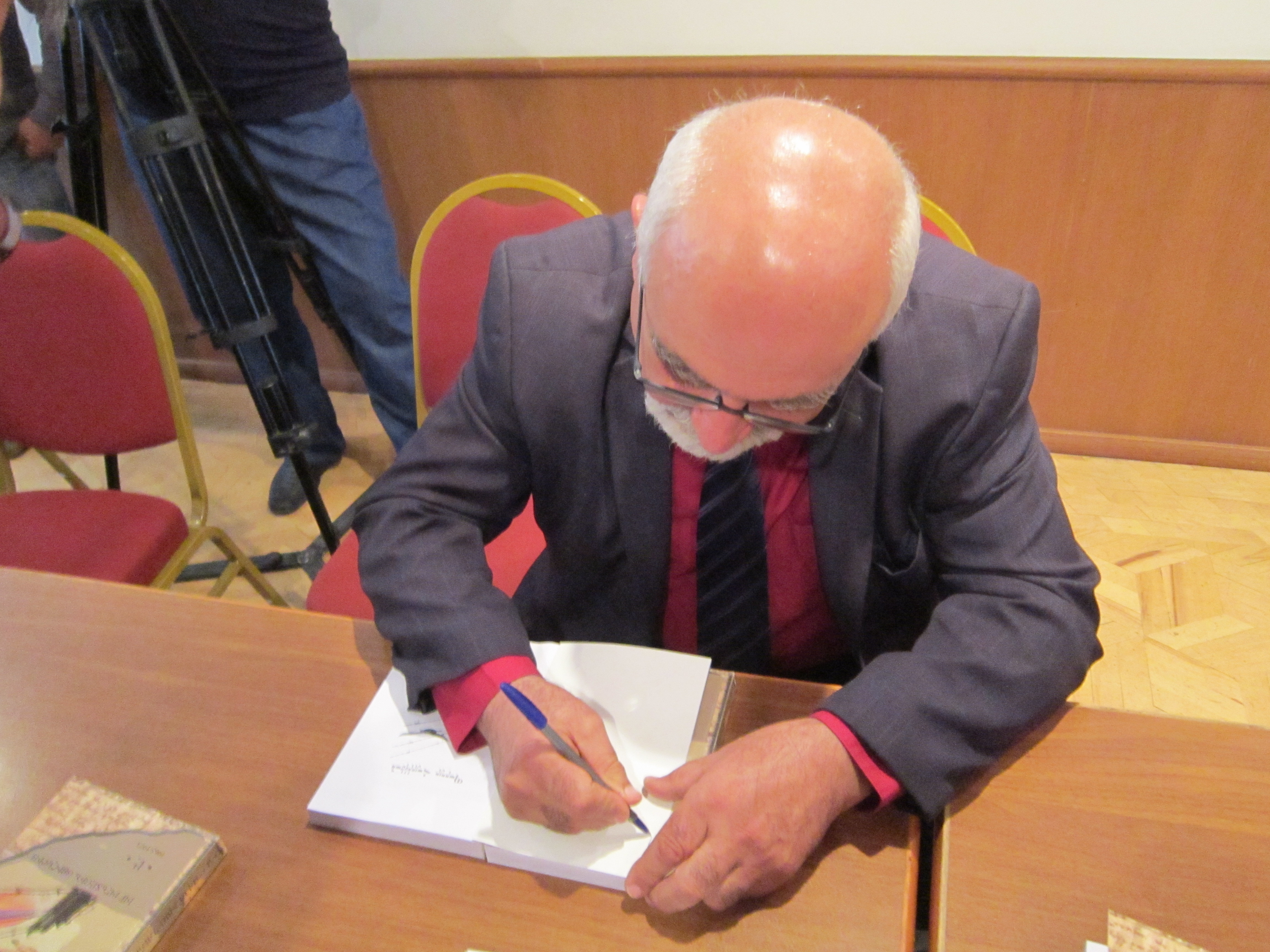
Paruyr Hayrikyan signing his books during a presentation in 2016

Hayrikyan speaks Armenian, Russian, English and Latvian, and has a good command of French, Ukrainian and Lithuanian. Hayrikyan was married to Yelena Sirotenko, they have three children and three grandchildren.

== Books ==
- On a Quest of the Light, by Paruyr Hayrikyan, US, Xlibris, 2015, 192 p. ISBN 978-1-5144-1787-4
- The formula of democraticity and complete democracy or necessary features of a democratic parliamentary system, by Paruyr Hayrikyan, Yerevan : UNSD publishing house, 2007, 16 p.
- Depi batsʻardzak joghovrdavarutyun, by Paruyr Hayrikyan, Yerevan, 2013, 44 p. (in Armenian)
- Luysi chanaparhin, by Paruyr Hayrikyan, Yerevan, 2004, 160 p. (in Armenian)
- Havatov ev sirov: filmashar 4 filmitsʻ, by Paruyr Hayrikyan, Yerevan, 2004 (in Armenian)
- Ankakhutʻyan chanaparhi erekʻ vaveragrer, by Paruyr Hayrikyan, Yerevan, 1997 (in Armenian)
- Ev ayspes tsʻmah, songs and poems, by Paruyr Hayrikyan, Yerevan, 1997 (in Armenian)
