= Movses Gorgisyan =

Armenian activist and politician (1961–1990)

National Hero of Armenia Movses Gorgisyan Մովսես Գորգիսյան
- Gorgisyan during a demonstration in front of Matenadaran
- Born: 3 December 1961; Yerevan, Armenian SSR, Soviet Union
- Died: 19 January 1990 (aged 28); Yeraskh, Armenian SSR, Soviet Union
- Education: Armenian State Pedagogical University
- Occupation: political figure

Movses Gevorgi Gorgisyan (Armenian: Մովսես Գևորգի Գորգիսյան; 3 December 1961 – 19 January 1990) was an Armenian politician and national hero, one of the leaders of the Nagorno-Karabakh movement. He was one of the founders of the Army of Independence. Widely known for his speeches on the independence of Armenia, he was also an active advocate of Artsakh's independence campaign.

== Biography ==
Movses Gorgisyan was born on December 3, 1961, in Yerevan, the capital of Armenia. In 1984, Gorgisyan graduated from the Armenian State Pedagogical University's Department of Culture, with the qualification of a stage director and producer. From 1986-1987, he worked at the Theatre of Goris. In 1987, he joined the national movement, becoming a member of the Union for National Self-Determination.

Gorgisyan led the demonstrations for independence in Yerevan which led to him being jailed in 1988. He also was an editor of the Armenian edition of Glasnost magazine. Gorgisyan was the first person to hoist Armenia's tricolor flag on 28 May 1988 for the first time. This was the same day the First Republic of Armenia was founded 70 years prior.

In late 1989, Gorgisyan and several other members of the Union for National Self-Determination founded the Army of Independence (Ankakhutʻyan banak), an armed group which engaged in violent clashes with the Soviet and Soviet Azerbaijani authorities in the Armenian SSR and the Nagorno-Karabakh Autonomous Oblast.

== Death ==
Gorgisyan was killed on 19 January 1990 during a battle with Azerbaijani forces in Yeraskh near the border villages in Ararat region and was buried at Tsitsernakaberd memorial complex. He posthumously received the highest title in Armenia, the National Hero of Armenia award.
