= Shant Harutyunyan =

- Շանթ Հարությունյան
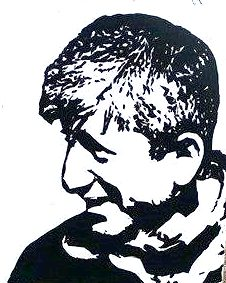
- Born: 3 February 1965 (age 61); Yerevan, Armenia
- Military career
- Allegiance: Armenia
- Commands: Army of Independence
- Conflicts: First Nagorno-Karabakh War

Shant Harutyunyan (Armenian: Շանթ Հարությունյան, born February 3, 1965, in Yerevan) is an Armenian political and public activist. He was the leader of the Tseghakron party until 2004 and is the current leader of the United National Initiative party.

== Biography ==
He is the son of Shahen Harutyunyan, the founder of National United Party (Armenia).

Harutyunyan was arrested for campaign against the ideology of USSR, and he was freed during the Perestroika as he was recognized as a political prisoner. Since 1988 he participated in the Karabakh movement and the first Karabakh War.

In 1997, he graduated from the Law Department of the Yerevan Hrachya Acharyan University.

After March 1 riots he was arrested, then released. He was the only person who was set free after the March 1 riots before being kept in a mental house. After that Harutyunyan announced that he had been taken to a mental hospital by the order of Russian security services.

On November 5, 2013 among with his followers he was arrested in Yerevan for anti-governmental accusations and attempt to walk to the presidential palace to start a "revolution". Fourteen activists were charged with Article 316.2 of the Criminal Code of Armenia (violence against a representative of the authorities). On November 18, 2013 a demonstration took place outside the National Security Service (NSS) building in Yerevan in defense of Harutyunyan and his supporters. Demonstrators also brought signs against Armenia joining the Russian-led Customs Union as Harutyunyan's struggle was also against what he calls Russian imperialism.

He was transferred to the insane hospital. Human Rights Defense organization recognized them as political prisoners. The head of the Helsinki Committee in Armenia, Michael Danielyan considered Shant Harutyunyan a political prisoner as "his activity was politically motivated". Helsinki Citizens’ Assembly Vandazor office leader Artur Sakunts also believes that Shant Harutyunyan and the other 13 prisoners became Armenia’s “new group of political prisoners”.

Different political activists supported Harutyunyan. "I feel big respect for Shant Harutyunyan. By his actions he wanted to show that he cannot stand the situation in the country any more", said Armen Martirosyan, Deputy Chairman of the Heritage Party, at a press conference. He added that Harutyunyan's initiative was doomed to failure but he was able to make people understand his idea.

Paruyr Hayrikyan also expressed support for Shant Harutyunian.

On December 28, 2013 wives of Shant Harutyunyan and other detainees demanded to lift ban on meeting with relatives. Armenian Women's Front joined them.

In January 2014 a number of Armenian citizens signed an Open letter The life of Shant Harutyunyan is in danger! addressed to Pope Francis, Barack Obama, Angela Merkel, Didier Burkhalter and Ban Ki-moon. "On hunger strike now, he is left without necessary medical supervision in a critical condition, with no possibility of communicating with the outside world, he did not have the right to meet his family members, any visit and contact is refused to him and the other 14 political prisoners", says the letter.

On January 9, 2014 Harutyunian was transferred to Convicts’ Hospital institution.

"We need more people like Shant Harutyunyan", said Raffi Hovannisian during the march in support of political prisoners on January 10, 2014. Participants of the march met with Justice Minister Hrayr Tovmasian. "I am responsible for his health and will do everything so that nothing will endanger his health," said the Minister.

== See also ==
- 2013 Armenian protests#Shant Harutyunyan

== Links ==
- "Shant Harutyunyan acted in the frames of Universal Declaration of Human Right"
- Իմ քաղաքական զարթոնքը
- Եթե հոգեկան հիվանդը Շանթն է, ուրեմն այս երկրում առողջ մարդ չկա
