= 2013 Yerevan City Council election =

Armenian election from 2013

- May 5, 2013
- Turnout: 53.53%
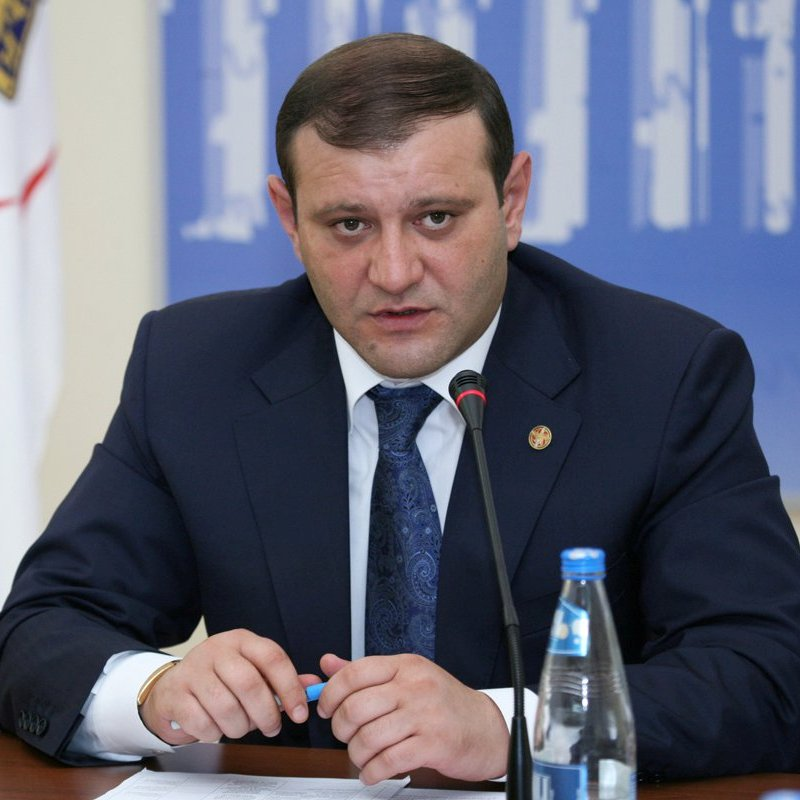

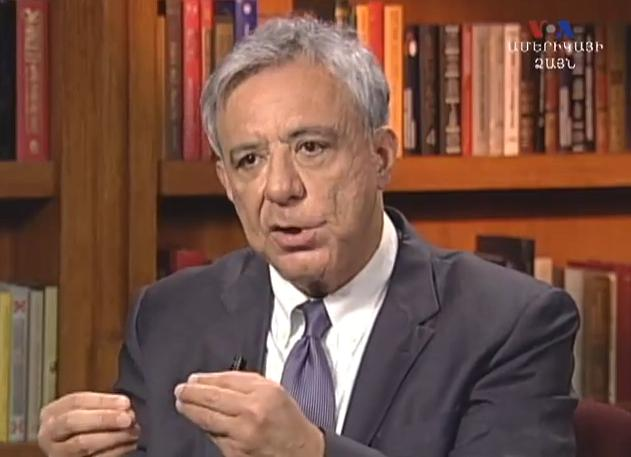

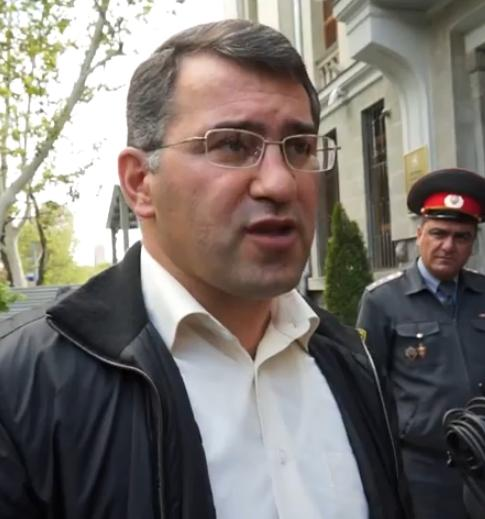
	First party	Second party	Third party
Leader	Taron Margaryan	Vartan Oskanian	Armen Martirosyan
Party	Republican	PAP	Barev Yerevan
Last election	47.43%, 35 seats	22.65%, 17 seats	did not participate
Seats won	42	17	6
Seat change	▲7	Steady	▲6
Popular vote	235,512	97,189	35,732
Percentage	55.89%	23.07%	8.48%
Swing	▲8.46%	▲0.42%	New
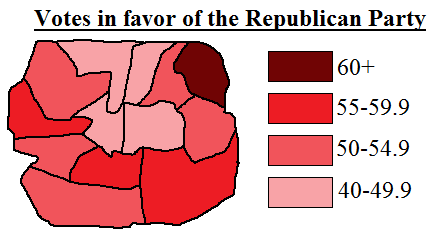
Mayor of Yerevan before election
Taron Margaryan
Republican
Elected Mayor of Yerevan
Taron Margaryan
Republican

Yerevan City Council election was held on May 5, 2013. The Republican Party of Armenia won 56% of the total vote, Prosperous Armenia had 23%, while Barev Yerevan won over 8%. The opposition parties and the local observers denounced the elections as "unfair".

== Background ==
The first Yerevan City Council election was held on 31 May 2009. The Republican Party of Armenia, which has been the ruling party in Armenia since 1999 won a majority in the legislature of Armenia's capital.

A disputed presidential election was held in Armenia on 18 February 2013. Since 19 February, Raffi Hovannisian, the runner-up of the election from the Heritage party claimed victory due to alleged electoral fraud that took place the day before. On 10 March 2013, after weeks of mass protests, Hovannisian announced about his decision to start a hunger strike calling incumbent and officially elected President Serzh Sargsyan to resign before 9 April, the inauguration day and find a "solution of this unprecedented pan-national fundamental issue before April 9."

On 15 March 2013, Hovannisian talking about his future plans while on hunger strike in the Freedom Square, stated that "Heritage Party will present its list next week: a man of the people will be the mayor of Yerevan. Yerevan will be returned to the people."

As the election day came closer, tensions between two former coalition members, PAP and RPA, grew, particularly on "young wings" level. A similar situation was witnessed prior to the 2012 parliamentary election.

== Parties ==
Seven parties were registered:

- Republican Party of Armenia — Taron Margaryan
- Barev Yerevan (Hello Yerevan)— Armen Martirosyan (from Heritage)
- Armenian National Congress — Vahagn Khachatryan
- Prosperous Armenia — Vartan Oskanian
- Armenian Revolutionary Federation — Armen Rustamyan
- Rule of Law — Armen Yeritsyan
- Mission Party — Mesrop Arakelyan

== Campaign ==
The election campaign started on 7 April 2013.

Raffi Hovannisian who disputes the 18 February presidential election and planned to hold an unofficial inauguration at the same time as officially elected President Serzh Sargsyan on 9 April, joined Barev Yerevan alliance's first-day campaign with tree planting in central Yerevan. Barev Yerevan is made up of mostly his Heritage party members and activists, in addition to a few members from the Democratic Way Party.

All opposition parties including Heritage, ANC, ARF and Prosperous Armenia denounced the voting lists, claiming that the Republican Party registers people from outside of Yerevan. The ANC representatives claimed that the "Republicans, using their levers of state power, in this case the passport and visa department, are engaged in voter list trickery." On April 22, 2013, several ANC youth members were beaten up in Ajapnyak.

== Election and oversight ==
According to the Central Election Commission, over 1,700 observers (local and international) were registered for monitoring the election. For the first time, over 100 diaspora Armenians will be observing the elections.

"Under the election law that pertains to the Yerevan municipal vote, a political party, or a bloc of parties, that manages to receive more than 40 percent of the vote will automatically have its top candidate installed as mayor. If neither party or bloc can get that majority, the decision will be collectively upon the newly elected Council of Elders."

== Results ==
Summary of the 5 May 2013 Yerevan City Council election results
Party	Votes	%	Seats	+/–
Republican	235,512	55.89%	42	▲7
PAP	97,189	23.07%	17	0
Barev Yerevan	35,732	8.48%	6	▲6
ANC	18,499	4.39%	0	▼13
ARF	15,999	3.80%	0	0
Rule of Law	15,733	3.73%	0	0
Mission Party (Armenia)	2,692	0.64%	0	0
Invalid votes	15,250	—	—	—
Total	437,212	100.00%	65	—
Electorate and turnout:	816,478	53.53%	—	—
Source: Central Electoral Commission of Armenia

== Claims of violations and irregularities ==
According to the Armenian service of Radio Free Europe/Radio Liberty, "groups of pro-government youths standing in or outside polling stations, keeping a watchful eye on voters and clearly influencing the process have been a fixture in Armenian elections." Throughout the election day, the opposition parties accused the ruling Republican party for alleged electoral violations. Most local observation mission also stated the elections were not fair.

== Reaction ==
=== Domestic ===
The results of the election were denounced by the main opposition parties.

- Barev Yerevan: Raffi Hovannisian stated on 9 May 2013 that everybody was defeated on 5 May election to the Yerevan city council.
- Armenian National Congress: ANC leader and Armenia's former President Levon Ter-Petrosyan stated the election was marred with "disgraceful irregularities". The ANC statement said the election was "another crime by the ruling regime against democracy and the people of Armenia."
- Prosperous Armenia: PPA thanked everyone who voted for them and claimed that the "electoral mechanisms" should change in Armenia.
- Rule of Law: RoL, which is the junior partner of the Republican Party in the government coalition, congratulated the RPA, PPA and Barev Yerevan for winning seats to the city council.

=== International ===
The Congress of Local and Regional Authorities Election Observation Mission, the only international observation mission, led by Stewart Dickson stated that the "secrecy of ballot was respected in great part."
