= Richard G. Hovannisian =

American historian (1932–2023)

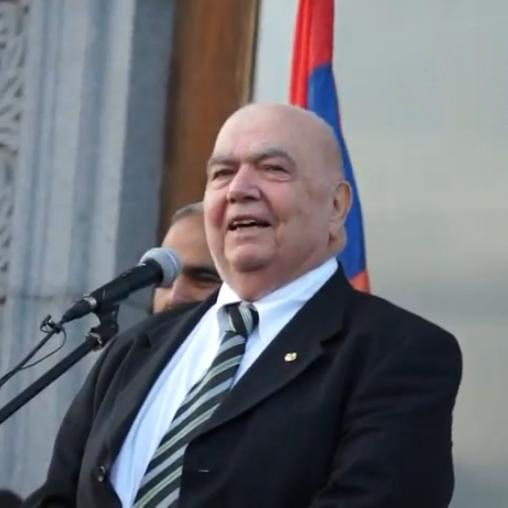
- Hovannisian during the anti-government protests in Yerevan's Freedom Square in March 2013
- Born: Richard Gable Hovannisian; November 9, 1932; Tulare, California, U.S.
- Died: July 10, 2023 (aged 90); Los Angeles, California, U.S.
- Education: UC Berkeley; UCLA
- Known for: Republic of Armenia (4 vols.)
- Spouse: Vartiter Hovannisian (née Kotcholosian)
- Scientific career
- Fields: Armenian, Russian, and Near Eastern history
- Workplaces: UCLA
- Doctoral advisor: Raymond H. Fisher
- Doctoral students: George Bournoutian, Levon Marashlian
- Website: Richard G. Hovannisian UCLA Homepage

Richard Gable Hovannisian (Armenian: Ռիչարդ Հովհաննիսյան, November 9, 1932 – July 10, 2023) was an American historian and professor at the University of California, Los Angeles. He is known mainly for his four-volume history of the First Republic of Armenia, and for his advocacy of Armenian genocide recognition.

== Early life & education ==
Hovannisian was born and raised in Tulare, California, into a family of Armenian genocide survivors. His father, Kaspar Gavroian, was born in 1901 in the village of Bazmashen (Pazmashen; now Sarıçubuk, Elâzığ), near Kharpert in the Ottoman Empire. Surviving the Genocide of 1915, he moved to the United States by 1920 and changed his last name from Gavroian to Hovannisian, after his father's name, Hovannes. In 1927, Kaspar married Siroon (Sarah) Nalbandian, born in Kesserig, Kharpert. Their oldest sons were born in 1928 (John) and 1930 (Ralph). Richard G. Hovannisian was born on November 9, 1932.

Hovannisian received his B.A. in history (1954) from the University of California, Berkeley, and his M.A. in history (1958) and his Ph.D. (1966) from University of California, Los Angeles (UCLA). He was also an associate professor of history at Mount St. Mary's College, Los Angeles, from 1966 to 1969, having joined UCLA in 1962. A Rankean by training, Hovannisian's scholarly work early on was focused on the history of the First Republic of Armenia (1918–20). His Ph.D. dissertation, originally envisioned to encompass its entire history, was published in 1967 as Armenia on the Road to Independence and would serve as a prologue to the four volumes (1971–1996) that he would eventually publish on the history of the republic. These volumes were generally well-received among scholarly circles.

== Career ==
In 1986, Hovannisian was appointed the first holder of the Armenian Educational Foundation Endowed Chair in Modern Armenian History at UCLA. Hovannisian was a Guggenheim Fellow who has received numerous honors for his scholarship, civic activities, and advancement of Armenian Studies. His biographical entries are included in Who's Who in America and Who's Who in the World among other scholarly and literary reference works. Hovannisian served on the board of directors of nine scholarly and civic organizations, including the Facing History and Ourselves Foundation; the International Institute on the Holocaust and Genocide; International Alert; the Foundation for Research on Armenian Architecture; and the Armenian National Institute (ANI). He received the UCLA Alumni Association's 2010–2011 "Most Inspiring Teacher" award.

From 2000, Hovannisian oversaw and edited a number of individual studies on the former Armenian-populated towns and cities of the Ottoman Empire.

In 2014, he became adjunct professor at USC "with the intention of advising on the Shoah Foundation’s integration of the Armenian Film Foundation’s collection of genocide survivor interviews." He then in 2018 donated his own interviews to USC Shoah Foundation’s Visual History Archive. The 1000 interviews are titled the Richard G. Hovannisian Armenian Genocide Oral History Collection, and is "the largest existing collection about the Armenian Genocide" according to the foundation. The interviews were first recorded in 1972, when he had students in California tape Armenian genocide survivors throughout the Southern part of the state, as well as other states and countries. In the 1990s and 2000s, as the survivors died, the interviews focused instead on the children of survivors, with the last class taking place in 2011.

In February 2020, Hovannisian received the Armenian Genocide Education Legacy award at the 4th Annual Armenian Genocide Education Awards Luncheon put on by The Armenian National Committee of America – Western Region’s Education Committee.

== Personal life and death ==
Hovannisian married Vartiter Kotcholosian in 1957 at the Holy Trinity Armenian Church of Fresno. They had four children: Raffi, Armen, Ani, and Garo. Raffi became the first Foreign Minister of Armenia and is currently an opposition politician.

Hovannisian died in Los Angeles on July 10, 2023, at the age of 90.

== Political views ==
In a 2006 interview Hovannisian criticized the Armenian government of then President Robert Kocharyan for its authoritarian nature and added that Armenia "must not become a failed state." Hovannisian partook in the protests following the 2013 presidential election in Armenia in which his son, Raffi, came in second according to official results.

== Selected works ==
- Hovannisian, Richard G (1967). Armenia on the Road to Independence, 1918. Berkeley: University of California Press. ISBN 978-0520005747. OCLC 1028172352.
- Hovannisian, Richard G. (1971). The Republic of Armenia. Vol. 1: The First Year, 1918–1919. Berkeley: University of California Press. ISBN 978-0520019843.
- Hovannisian, Richard G. (1982). The Republic of Armenia. Vol. 2: From Versailles to London, 1919–1920. Berkeley: University of California Press. ISBN 978-0520041868.
- Hovannisian, Richard G. (1996a). The Republic of Armenia. Vol. 3: From London to Sèvres, February–August 1920. Berkeley: University of California Press. ISBN 978-0520088030.
- Hovannisian, Richard G. (1996b). The Republic of Armenia. Vol. 4: Between Crescent and Sickle: Partition and Sovietization. Berkeley: University of California Press. ISBN 978-0520088047.
- The Armenian Holocaust, Cambridge, Massachusetts, Armenian Heritage Press (1980)
- The Armenian People from Ancient to Modern Times, 2 vols. New York: St. Martin's Press, 1997 (editor)
- Remembrance and Denial: The Case of the Armenian Genocide. Detroit: Wayne State University Press, 1998 (editor)

=== UCLA conference series proceedings ===
As the Chair of Modern Armenian History at UCLA, Hovannisian organized the conference series titled "Historic Armenian Cities and Provinces". The conference proceedings, all edited by Hovannisian, that have been published (in Costa Mesa, CA, by Mazda Publishers) are:

1. Armenian Van/Vaspurakan (2000) OCLC 44774992
2. Armenian Baghesh/Bitlis and Taron/Mush (2001) OCLC 48223061
3. Armenian Tsopk/Kharpert (2002) OCLC 50478560
4. Armenian Karin/Erzerum (2003) OCLC 52540130
5. Armenian Sebastia/Sivas and Lesser Armenia (2004) OCLC 56414051
6. Armenian Tigranakert/Diarbekir and Edessa/Urfa (2006) OCLC 67361643
7. Armenian Cilicia (2008) OCLC 185095701 (together with Simon Payaslian)
8. Armenian Pontus: The Trebizond-Black Sea Communities (2009) OCLC 272307784
9. Armenian Constantinople (2010) (together with Simon Payaslian)
10. Armenian Kars and Ani (2011)
11. Armenian Smyrna/Izmir (2012)
12. Armenian Kesaria/Kayseri and Cappadocia (2013)
13. Armenian Communities of Asia Minor (2014)
14. Armenian Communities of Persia/Iran (2021)

=== Articles ===
- Hovannisian, Richard G. (1968). "The Allies and Armenia, 1915–18". Journal of Contemporary History. 3 (1): 145–168. doi:10.1177/002200946800300108. JSTOR 259971. S2CID 159108928.
- Hovannisian, Richard G. (1969). "Simon Vratzian and Armenian Nationalism". Middle Eastern Studies. 5 (3): 192–220. doi:10.1080/00263206908700129. JSTOR 4282291.
- Hovannisian, Richard G. (1971). "Russian Armenia. A Century of Tsarist Rule". Jahrbücher für Geschichte Osteuropas. 19 (1). Franz Steiner Verlag: 31–48. JSTOR 41044266.
- Hovannisian, Richard G. (1973). "Armenia and the Caucasus in the Genesis of the Soviet-Turkish Entente". International Journal of Middle East Studies. 4 (2): 129–147. doi:10.1017/s0020743800027409. JSTOR 162238. S2CID 162360397.
- Hovannisian, Richard G. (1974). "Dimensions of Democracy and Authority in Caucasian Armenia, 1917-1920". The Russian Review. 33 (1): 37–49. doi:10.2307/127620. JSTOR 127620.

== Bibliography ==
- Hovannisian, Garin K. (2010). Family of Shadows: A Century of Murder, Memory, and the Armenian American Dream. New York: HarperCollins. ISBN 978-0-06-1-79208-3. (the author is a grandson of Richard Hovannisian)
