= 2013 Armenian protests =

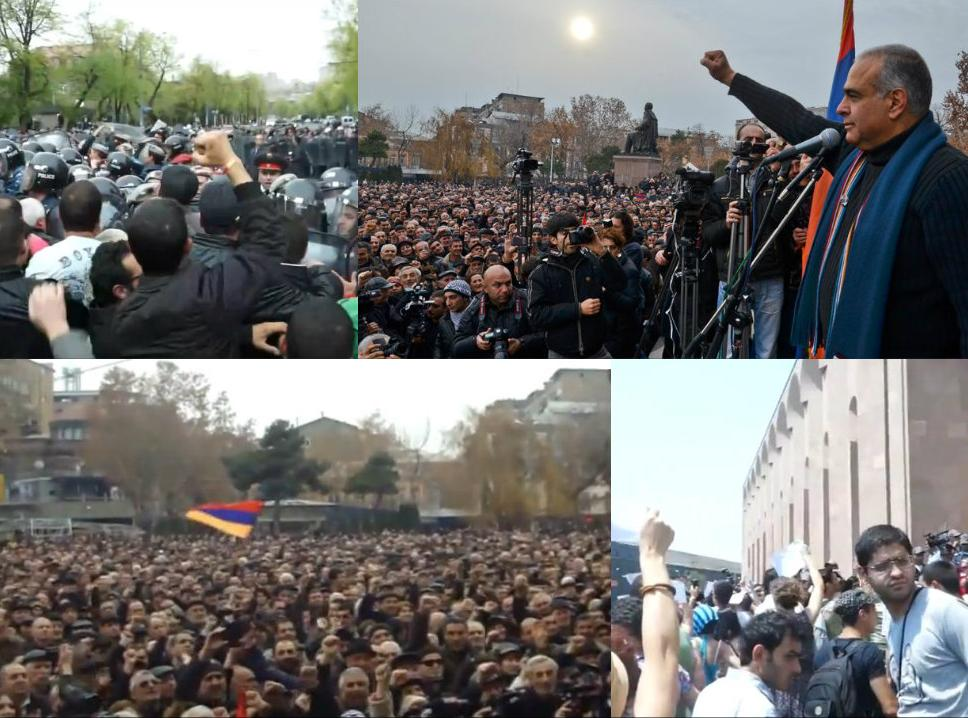
- Raffi Hovannisian addressing the crowd at Yerevan's Freedom Square on 22 February 2013. Clash between the protesters and the police on Baghramyan Avenue on 9 April 2013. Protests in front of the Yerevan City Hall on 23 July.
- Date: 19 February – 23 December 2013 (10 months and 4 days)
- Location: Armenia: Yerevan, Gyumri, Vanadzor, and almost every major cities and towns Armenian diaspora: Los Angeles, New York City, Paris, Brussels
- Caused by: alleged electoral fraud during the 18 February 2013 presidential election, corruption, monopoly, inflation, unemployment, increase in public transportation fare
- Goals: Resignation of President Serzh Sargsyan; Improvements in public transport with less cost to the population; Not joining the Customs Union of Belarus, Kazakhstan, and Russia; Cancellation of the gas deal with Russia
- Methods: demonstrations, sit-ins, hunger strike, student protest, online activism, civil disobedience
- Result: Peaceful protests suppressed on 9 April; Public transportation fare increase canceled on 25 July due to protests; Police stopped a violent march on the Presidential Palace on 5 November

Parties
Political opposition: Heritage; Civil opposition: Pre-Parliament; Hayazn; Various groups	Government of Armenia: Police; Yerevan Municipality Ruling parties: Republican Party of Armenia; Orinats Yerkir

Lead figures
Raffi Hovannisian; Nikol Pashinyan; Armen Martirosyan; Andrias Ghukasyan; Jirair Sefilian; Tigran Khzmalyan; Paruyr Hayrikyan; Shant Harutyunyan	Serzh Sargsyan (President); Tigran Sargsyan (PM); Hovik Abrahamyan (Parliament Speaker); Taron Margaryan (Mayor of Yerevan); Vladimir Gasparyan (Police Chief)

Number
9 April: 12,000–"tens of thousands"	

Casualties
- Detained: 20 (5 November); 110+ (2 December)

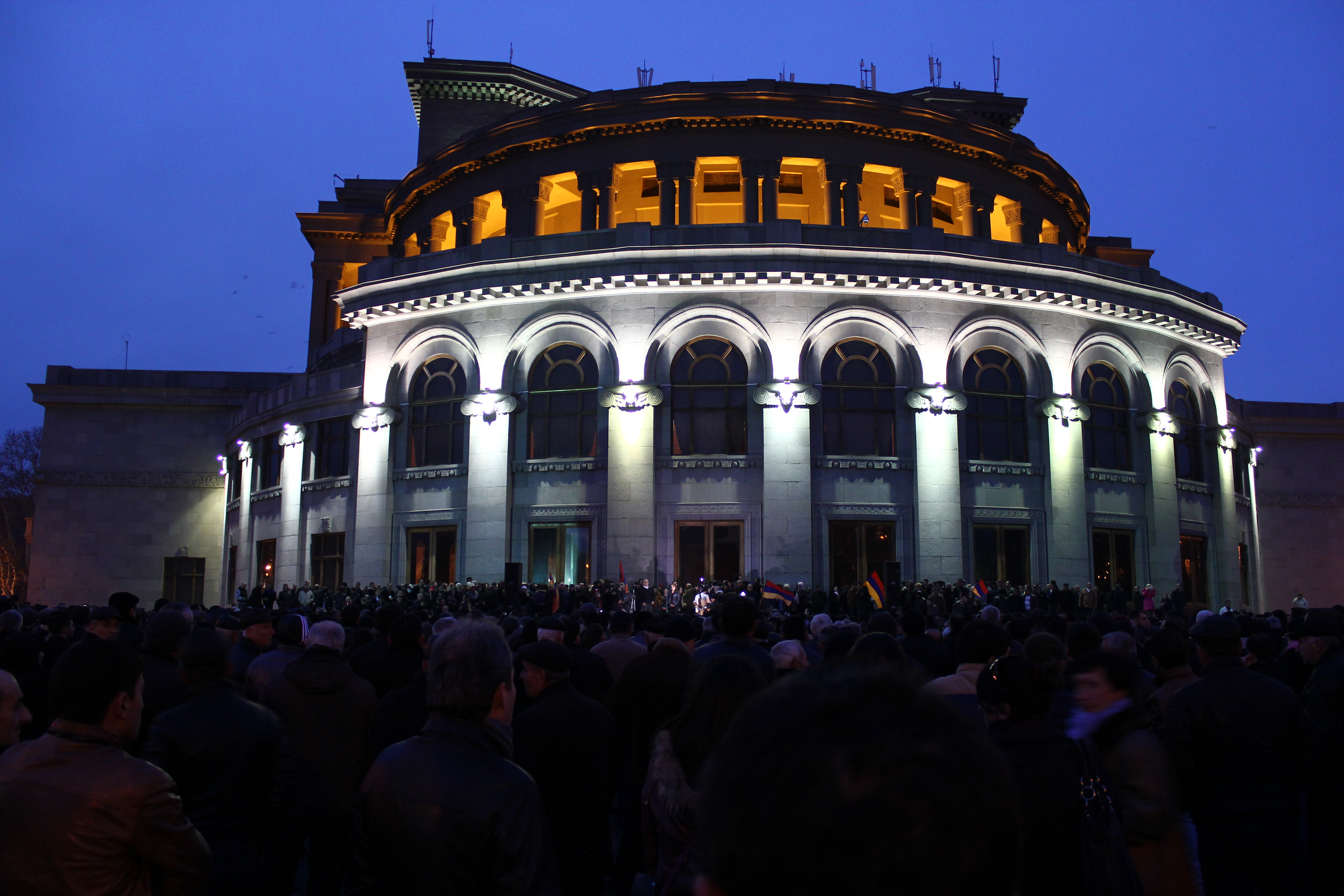
Hovannisian's rally in front of the Yerevan Opera House on 20 February

Various political and civil groups staged anti-government protests in Armenia in 2013. The first series of protests were held following the 2013 presidential election and were led by the former presidential candidate Raffi Hovannisian. Hovannisian, who, according to official results, lost to incumbent Serzh Sargsyan, denounced the results claiming they were rigged. Starting on 19 February, Hovannisian and his supporters held mass rallies in Yerevan's Freedom Square and other cities. On 10 March, Hovannisian started a hunger strike, calling elected President Sargsyan to resign before 9 April, the inauguration day. Hovannisian called "for the solution of this unprecedented pan-national fundamental issue before April 9." During an interview on 18 March 2013, Sargsyan said he would not visit Hovannisian and described his claims as "arrogant phrases seasoned with obscenities". Sargsyan was inaugurated on 9 April 2013, while Hovannisian and thousands of people gathered in the streets of Yerevan to protest it, clashing with the police forces blocking the way to the Presidential Palace. Hovannisian's movement was dubbed "Barevolution", a portmanteau of barev (բարև, "hello") and revolution, referring to Raffi Hovannisian's habit of walking up to people and greeting them during the election campaign.

Since early May 2013, a number of non-formal opposition groups, such as veterans of the First Nagorno-Karabakh War, have protested against the government of Serzh Sargsyan. The Pre-Parliament civil initiative also held a number of rallies in Yerevan and other cities calling for alternative struggle against the government. Following an announcement on 20 July 2013 of increases in public transportation fares, young activists (mostly students) held various kinds of protests throughout central Yerevan against the decision. It was described as the first ever act of civil disobedience in independent Armenian history. On 5 November, a small violent protest took place in central Yerevan organized by opposition activist Shant Harutyunyan and calling for an overthrow of the government. A series of rallies were held against Armenia's future membership of Customs Union of Belarus, Kazakhstan, and Russia, including on 2 December during Russian President Vladimir Putin's visit and on 23 December against the gas deal with Russia.

== 'Barevolution' ==
=== Background ===
The runner-up Raffi Hovannisian didn't recognize the legitimacy of the election and on late night of 18 February 2013, he claimed victory in a press conference, stating "We all know that we have won", continuing "for the first time in 20 years the citizens have said yes to our constitution, to the rule of law, to democracy and our future."

However, the international observers gave an overall positive assessment of the conduct of the presidential elections in which Serzh Sargsyan was reelected for the second term. Sargsyan also received congratulations from EU, Council of Europe, NATO as well as from the presidents of major powers such as United States, Russia, United Kingdom, France, Iran, Turkey and many others.

=== Early stage (19 February–10 March) ===
On 19 February, a mass of his supporters gathered in Yerevan's Freedom Square, where Hovannisian urged President Sargsyan to accept "people's victory" and concede his defeat. Armenia's former PM Hrant Bagratyan, who came in the third place, claimed that "authorities tried to stop Hovannisian from winning" and the next day, he urged Hovannisian and Sargsyan to sit at the negotiating table, stating that the election was "not free and unfair" and saw "willing to hold talks". He called on "Raffi Hovannisian and Serzh Sargsyan to sit at the negotiating table and try to find the way out of the situation. Otherwise, it will be impossible to avoid further escalation and clashes." On 19 February 2013, several activists broke into press conference held by OSCE PA election observers and screamed "Stop Legitimizing Fraudulent Elections in Armenia". The observers walked out of the hall and asked for a written statement by the activists in Armenian or English.

On 20 February 2013, Hovannisian and his supporters gathered in the Freedom Square. Hovannisian once gain claimed victory and called the people to stay in the square until tomorrow and meet President Sargsyan whose ruling party is expected to hold a rally there. Opposition politician Nikol Pashinyan joined Hovannisian and addressed the people in Freedom Square.

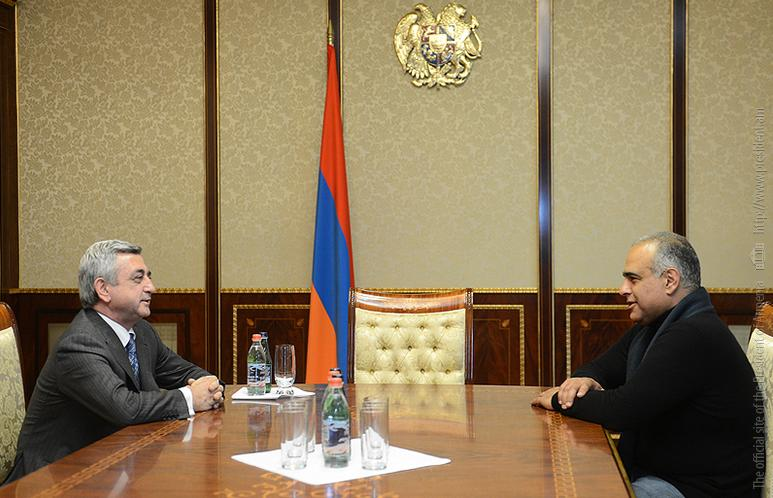
Sargsyan and Hovannisian in the Presidential Palace on 21 February 2013

On 21 February 2013, Hovannisian and Sargsyan met in the Presidential Palace in Yerevan. First, he told a group of his supporters that he was heading for negotiations with Sargsyan, then marched up to the Presidential Palace on Baghramyan Street. The meeting with incumbent President lasted for more than two hours. According to Hovannisian they discussed ways to end the post-election dispute. After Hovannisian left the palace, he said to the gathered crowd of his supporters that "It is not Serzh versus Raffi" and continued that "We are committed to our victory and the Armenian people will have their victory tomorrow." He later announced to his supporters in Freedom Square that he will disclose the details of the meeting tomorrow.

The demonstrations continued on 22 February 2013, with Raffi Hovannisian announcing about yesterday's meeting with incumbent president Serzh Sargsyan. According to Hovannisian, he demanded Sargsyan to accept the will of the people and Sargsyan said "no". Armen Martirosyan, a former MP from Hovannisian's Heritage party, claimed that Ashot Giziryan, the Republican governor of Shirak Province, where Hovannisian won the biggest support, had resigned because of "not enough electoral fraud", while Giziryan himself said "I conceded my defeat and tendered resignation. Let Raffi now concede his defeat."

Another major opposition party, the Armenian Revolutionary Federation, joined Hovannisian's rally. ARF Council member Armen Rustamyan addressed the crowd saying that "this is an unstoppable movement to establish the rule of the people." Andrias Ghukasyan, one of the candidates, who did not actively participate in the election, because he was performing a hunger strike against "fake elections", later joined the rally and stated that "the fake elections showed that state cannot be fair, but people displayed their will and came to congratulate Raffi Hovannisian who managed to consolidate Armenian society." Famous Armenian singer-songwriter Ruben Hakhverdyan was also present at the rally. In particular, his statements such as "I don't care for the opinion of those at the top" sparked enthusiasm among the crowd.

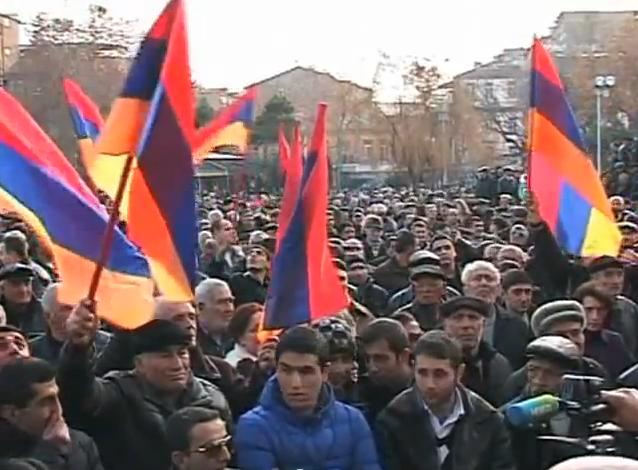
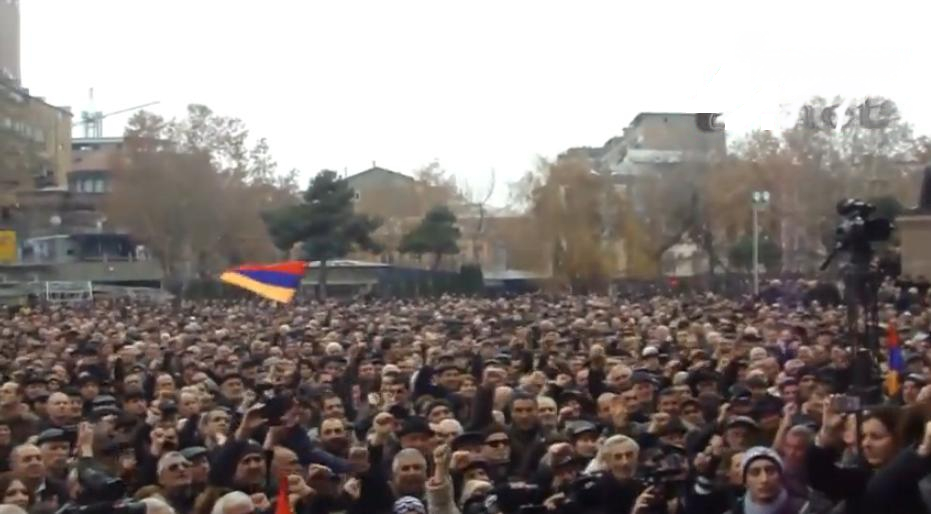
Hovannisian's supporters at the Freedom Square, Yerevan on 20 and 22 February 2013.

At the end, Hovannisian called the crowd to continue the "peaceful and constitutional struggle" and informed that he and his supporters will be touring throughout Armenia "to take the victory and greetings." He said they will be in Ashtarak, Vanadzor and Gyumri. The rally ended with a march.

On 23 February 2013, Hovannisian traveled throughout Armenia. He visited the cities of Gyumri, Vanadzor, Ashtarak, Spitak, Aparan where thousands gathered to hear his speech and the "victory celebration". In Gyumri, Armenia's second largest city, where Hovannisian defeated Sargsyan by over 40%, he claimed that he is "not issuing ultimatums but it must be evident to the third president [Sargsyan] respected by me that it's time to transfer power to the people of Armenia." On 23 February 2013, Levon Ter-Petrosyan, the first President and the leader of the Armenian National Congress, declared that "the results are obvious to me: [President] Serzh Sargsyan was not elected and the winner is Raffi Hovannisian. I have no doubts whatsoever." He also talked about the possibility of joining the protests.

On 24 February 2013, a short rally took place in the Freedom Square, where thousands of his supporters were gathered. He in particular announced that "Freedom Square recognizes no party any more, since here stand Armenian people, who in the past elections voted for the Heritage, Armenian National Congress, Prosperous Armenia and even for the Republican Party." Hovannisian claimed that "our only salvation is in our unity." Nikol Pashinyan, one of Hovannisian's main supporting opposition politicians, urged Hovannisian to for a new government that would be confirmed by direct democratic practices on the Freedom Square.

An apricot-colored poster with the word "Բարև" (hello) written on it is the symbol of the movement

On 25 February 2013, Hovannisian held a press conference, where he talked about the current situation in Armenia. He said there is a possibility of appealing the election results in the Constitutional Court. He also claimed that Sargsyan offered him to wait until 2017 and 2018, which was rejected.

On 25 February 2013, several hundred university students declared a student strike against electoral fraud during the election. Students from the Yerevan State University started the strike, later students from the Yerevan State Medical University and Armenian National Agrarian University joined them. The student strikes continued on the following days. The Ministry of Education and Science announced that "political activities and propaganda within the premises of educational institutions is prohibited by law."

On 26 and 27 February 2013, Hovannisian visited the cities and towns in the Ararat plain and Syunik.

On 28 February 2013, Hovannisian and his supporters once again gathered in the Freedom Square to protest the election results. Famous French-Armenian actor Vardan Petrosyan had arrived in Yerevan a day earlier to address the crowd. He in particular stated that the movement was a victory that took place in "the mind, in the heart, in one's very soul."

The mass rallies were disrupted on 1 March 2013, to commemorate the memory of the 10 victims of the 2008 Armenian presidential election protests.

On 2 March 2013, the mass rallies in Freedom Square continued. Hovannisian set a new "deadline" for the authorities to start "handing over power to the people."

On 3 March 2013, Hovannisian met with Prosperous Armenia leader Gagik Tsarukyan and discussed the ongoing situation in the country. PAP had earlier stated that they are "next to the people."

On 4 March 2013, Hovannisian submitted an appeal to the Constitutional Court. His claim will be considered by the court and the court will issue a verdict in 10 days.

On 5 March 2013, despite the snow, another rally was held in the Freedom Square. Hovannisian once again stated that there's no way back. He pointed out that "now we have nothing to say [to them], we have to act and we won't get diverted from our path." The Armenian Revolutionary Federation representative Armen Rustamyan urged the opposition parties to consolidate around the upcoming Yerevan City Council election in May.

On 6 March 2013, Hovannisian traveled in Tavush Province. His supporters gathered in the cities of Dilijan, Ijevan, Noyemberyan and Berd to hear Hovannisian's speech and congratulations on "people's victory." On 7 March 2013, Hovannisian continued his tour throughout Armenia's northern and central provinces. He visited Chambarak, Talin, Artik, Vanadzor, Gyumri, Spitak, Aparan.

On 8 March 2013, on the International Women's Day, the rally in support of Raffi Hovannisian was also dedicated to Armenian women. Among other, Hovannisian's wife Armenouhi also addressed the crowd in Freedom Square.

On 9 March 2013, Hovannisian concluded his visits to the provinces of Armenia in Gegharkunik. Hovannisian stopped in the towns Vardenis, Martuni, Gavar, and Sevan. In Sevan, a small incident occurred involving the mayor.

==== In the Armenian diaspora ====
Groups of Armenian-Americans protested the results in front of the Armenian consulates New York on February 22 and Los Angeles on 24 February 2013.

On 26 February 2013, prominent Armenian American rock singer, Serj Tankian (lead singer of System of a Down) sent an open letter to President Sargsyan, in which he congratulated on reelection, but also questioned the fairness of the past election. He wrote to incumbent Sargsyan saying "it's time for change" after non-government organizations reported widespread voting fraud. "Corruption, injustice, emigration, lawlessness and falsified elections" are prompting Armenians to emigrate, Tankian wrote. "Citizens across Armenia are protesting the outcome of the elections and the injustice inherent in the political establishment." He also urged Sargsyan to protect the country from its enemies as " Those who steal elections from my people are domestic enemies that need to be punished."

On 8 March 2013, a group of French Armenians gathered in front of the Armenian embassy in Paris to protest the alleged rigged election results. On 10 March 2013, a similar protest was held by Armenian community members in Brussels.

=== Hunger strike (10–31 March) ===
On 10 March 2013, after addressing his supporters in Freedom Square, Hovannisian announced about his decision to start a hunger strike. He urged President-elect Serzh Sargsyan to resign. According to Hovannisian, "this is not just a hunger strike, but a boycott against lies and fraud."

At the end, he stated that "[i]f on April 9 [the inauguration date] he [Serzh Sargsyan] gives a pseudo-oath on the Constitution and the Holy Bible and the Supreme Patriarch blesses it and thus defiles the Bible, they will do it on my dead body."

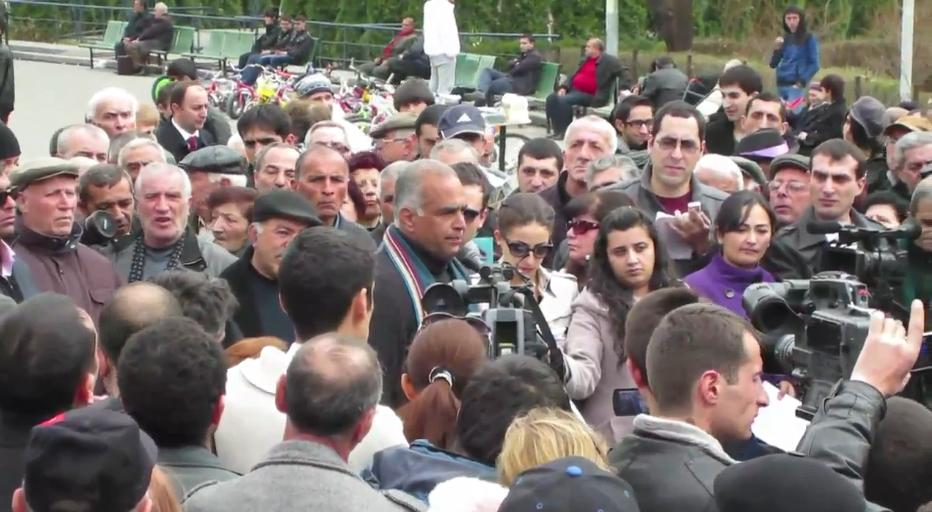
Hovannisian giving an interview in the Freedom Square on 11 March 2013

On 11 March 2013, after the first day of the hunger strike, Hovannisian described his action as "the new milestone of registering the de jure victory of the Armenian people."

Several notable politicians visited Hovannisian the next day. Among them former Prime Minister Aram Sargsyan, 2003 Presidential candidate Stepan Demirchyan, former Foreign Minister Vartan Oskanian, former Speaker of the National Assembly Tigran Torosyan, MP Nikol Pashinyan and Andrias Ghukasyan. That day, talking about a possible solution of the conflict, Hovannisian also stated that the solution "should be a complex, integral, immediate and guaranteed" one "that I will be able to report to the people to end this standoff." His request to put up a tent was rejected by the police.

On 14 March 2013, the Constitutional Court of Armenia issued a verdict confirming the victory of President Sargsyan.

On 15 March 2013, Hovik Abrahamyan, the Speaker of the National Assembly, visited Hovannisian. Abrahamyan stated that they "have not come to any common denominator, but I think that most likely we will meet again to discuss these issues."

Hovannisian later announced about holding civil forums at the Freedom Square. By 21 March 2012, five such events were held with the presence of Nikol Pashinyan, Andrias Ghukasyan, Tigran Khzmalyan and others.

On 22 March 2013, thousands gathered at Freedom Square to hear Hovannisian's speech. He proposed Sargsyan a "last and minimum level" compromise, which called for a "comprehensive power sharing" with the authorities. His proposal includes two options. The first is "immediate conduct of new presidential elections." Hovannisian's second option is "the sharing of power between the authorities and the people" by holding snap parliamentary elections by the end of the year and replacing key regional governors and government members candidates proposed by Hovannisian. Hovannisian later signed it in front of the crowd ready to be sent to President Serzh Sargsyan.

On 25 March 2013, President Sargsyan responded to Hovannisian's proposal, urging Hovannisian to "stop the hunger strike, recuperate for a day or two" and then the two "will start working seriously together."

In the days following, Hovannisian and Sargsyan sent each other letters to start a dialogue. Sargsyan insisted that Hovannisian stop the hunger strike and visit the Presidential Palace, while Hovannisian proposed several times for Sargsyan to go to the Freedom Square and start a negotiation process there.

On 29 March 2013, Hovannisian declared that he will end the hunger strike on the Easter day on 31 March and start to visit the regions. As promised, Hovannisian ended his hunger strike on 31 March.

=== Later developments (1–8 April) ===
Starting on 1 April 2013, Hovannisian started to visit towns and villages of Armenia. Hovannisian announced on 2 April 2013, that he will try to overshadow Serzh Sargsyan inauguration on 9 April, by holding a similar event in either Freedom Square or Republic Square in Yerevan.

On 3 April 2013, talking about the future plans of the movement in Martuni, Hovannisian stated that "Now, you have to decide whose citizens you are – of the Republic of Armenia or of the former president, former governor, chief of police, and I don't know who else." Hovannisian claimed that he visits the provinces "to recruit citizens for the April 9 inauguration of a new Armenia."

April 7 marked the start of the 2013 Yerevan City Council election. Hovannisian joined Barev Yerevan alliance's first-day campaign with tree planting in central Yerevan. Barev Yerevan is made up of mostly his Heritage party members and activists.

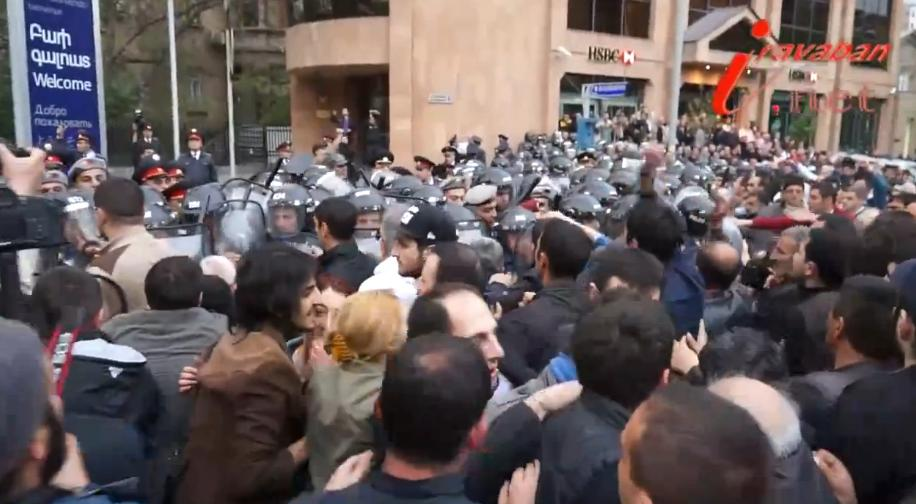
The clash between the protesters and policemen on Baghramyan Avenue on 9 April 2013

=== 9 April ===
On 9 April 2013, the officially elected president, incumbent Serzh Sargsyan was inaugurated as president of Armenia at the Karen Demirchyan Complex. On the same day, Sargsyan accepted the resignation of the last cabinet in order to form a new one in the upcoming days.

In the meantime, thousands of people gathered in the Freedom Square to witness Raffi Hovannisian's "inauguration of a new Armenia." After the formal ceremony in the square, Hovannisian and his supporters hold a "rally of victory" in the streets of central Yerevan. After rallying through several streets Hovannisian and the protesters came back to the Freedom Square at around 6 p.m. and with the demand of the crowd yelling "Hima, hima!" (Now, now!), Hovannisian headed to Baghramyan Avenue, where the Presidential Palace is located. The riot police armed with batons and shields blocked the Baghramyan Avenue. The protesters clashed with the police, resulting in few injuries, including Armen Martirosyan who led the Heritage party list for the 2013 Yerevan City Council election.

=== Decline ===
On 12 April 2013, Hovannisian and few thousand of his supporters gathered in the Freedom Square. Hovannisian pledged to continue the struggle and stated that "In the coming weeks and months we will not give rest to this government and will continue our struggle in Yerevan and other cities and towns." On 19 April 2013, Hovannisian pronounced to the Heritage party members and their supporters about the civic alliance, which he said should be above partisanship. Armenian Revolutionary Federation was also present at the meeting, where they presented their own future plan as proposal for Hovannisian.

The Yerevan City Council election took place on 5 May 2013. The Republican Party of Armenia won absolute majority, while all opposition parties denounced the election results.

On 9 May 2013, Raffi Hovannisian addressed his supporters on Freedom Square claiming that the "struggle will continue" and invited all political parties to a meeting on 19 May.

On 15 June 2013, Hovannisian held a small meeting with his supporters. He assured that "What we initiated 6 months ago is still in force. The main task of the Heritage is to restore the faith of people".

On 23 August, Hovannisian held the biggest rally in months on the 23rd anniversary of Armenia's Declaration of independence. Thousands gathered, while Hovannisian promised a series of anti-government protests in the upcoming month of September.

On 20 September 2013, the day before marking the 22nd year of Armenia's independence, Raffi Hovannisian along with former Soviet dissident Paruyr Hayrikyan held a rally at Freedom Square. Hovannisian stated that "Independence Day is not only a national holiday, but also responsibility. Today, on the eve of the holiday, we have gathered here to say that our statehood is in danger." Hovannisian's Heritage party was one of the only parties in Armenia to openly oppose President Sargsyan's decision to join the Customs Union of Belarus, Kazakhstan and Russia.

== Other protests ==
On 16 May 2013, a small crowd gathered at the Republic Square in front of the government building in Yerevan to protest the possible 65% increase in Russian gas price.

On 18 May 2013, hundreds protested the death of 19-year-old soldier named Lyuks Stepanyan killed in Tavush Province on 15 May in front of the government building at the Republic Square. They claimed there is a lack of attention from the military authorities for the death of the soldier. A clash occurred on Yerevan-Sevan highway the same day. Allegedly, police cars were smashed in order to open up the way to Yerevan.

On 16 June 2013, a group of veterans of the First Nagorno-Karabakh War held a rally in Freedom Square. They called on the Armenian government to improve their social condition.

On 5 July Karabakh War veterans held a rally in Freedom Square with similar demands.

=== Pre-Parliament ===
Pre-Parliament started a series of protests in Armenia's second largest city of Gyumri on 9 May 2013. Pre-Parliament members and their supporters held 'protest walks' in Yerevan on 11 and 12 May.

On 17 May 2013, the Pre-Parliament held a rally on Freedom Square. Notable speakers included Karabakh War veteran Jirair Sefilian, former ASALA member Alexander Yenikomshian and filmmaker Tigran Khzmalyan.

On 28 May 2013, the Pre-Parliament held a rally in Gyumri, while on 29 May they gathered in Armenia's third largest city of Vanadzor.

On 31 May 2013, a rally was held in Yerevan's Freedom Square. Colonel Varuzhan Avetisyan stated at the rally that Jirair Sefilian, one of the leaders of the Pre-Parliament had received death threats in the past days.

On 14 June 2013, a public discussion (forum) of Pre-Parliament took place in Freedom Square.

On 25 June 2013, Pre-Parliament held a small rally in southern Armenian city of Kapan.

On 12 July 2013, Pre-Parliament held a rally in Freedom Square. According to the police, around 500 people gathered.

=== Public transportation fare increase protests (20–25 July) ===
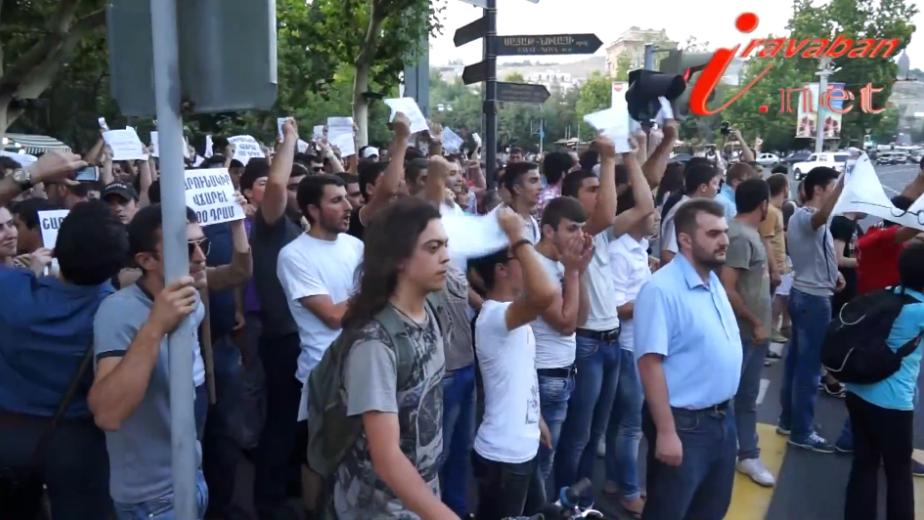
Protests in central Yerevan on 22 July 2013.

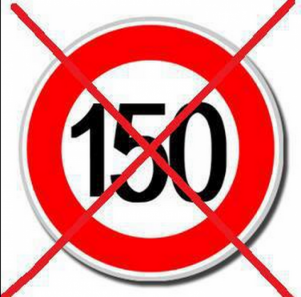
Posters such as this one were widely used by the protesters.

External videos
- Չեմ վճարելու 150 դրամ: A video by Armenian celebrities and public figures showing solidarity to the protesters

Since 20 July 2013, the tariffs for minibuses (marshrutkas) and trolleybuses were increased by 50% and 100% respectively. The new fares were set to be 150 drams (~35 US cents) for minibuses and 100 drams (~25 cents) for trolleybuses. According to Henrik Navasardyan, the head of the Yerevan Mayor's Office Transport Department said that the "increase in public transport fares is connected not only with the recent rise in natural gas and electricity tariffs, but is also prompted by other business considerations. Thus, he said, the new fare rates will enable companies to upgrade their vehicles and improve the quality of service."

According to a study, this would effect around 65% of Yerevan residents as most of them use public transportation. Days after the new fare was in effect, many passengers still refuse to pay the new tariffs. Armen Poghosyan, the chairman of the Armenian Consumers' Association, said that the "most important decision for the society was made without any public discussion."

On 19 July 2013, tens of protesters performed a sit-in against the fare increase on the steps of the Yerevan City Hall. On 20 July 2013, hundreds of young activists throughout central Yerevan called on people not to pay the new fares. The same day, 3 protesters were detained. Similar protests were held in the following days. On 23 July 2013, protests continued throughout central Yerevan. Protests continued in Yerevan on 24 July, especially in Kentron district, some protesters tried to block the streets and clashed with policemen. Four activists were detained and later released. As young activists walked urging people to pay the old fares, ordinary people joined them to show solidarity. According to a survey of Aravot among bus drivers, more and more people who use public transportation refused to pay the new fares.

Besides ordinary citizens performing acts of civil disobedience, several celebrities, comedians, actors, TV people, journalists joined the protests by offering free rides to people. On 24 July, a video (see external link on the right) appeared on YouTube showing a number of Armenian celebrities and public figures, including comedian Hayko, Garik and Vache of Vitamin Club, actors Lala Mnatsakanyan, Segey Danielyan, TV commentator Petros Ghazaryan, show host Lusine Badalyan and others announcing solidarity with the protesters.

On 25 July 2013, after days of mass protests, Mayor of Yerevan Taron Margaryan issued a statement canceling the new fares. Thousands of Yerevan residents celebrated their "victory" until midnight. On 26 July smaller protests continued near the City Hall. They demanded resignation of the Yerevan Transportation Department Head Henrik Navasardyan.

=== Against Armenia's entry to the Customs Union ===
On 3 September 2013, during his visit to Moscow Armenian President Serzh Sargsyan stated that Armenia will join the Customs Union of Belarus, Kazakhstan and Russia, despite the fact that it was expected that Armenia was going to sign the European Union Association Agreement. On 4 September, a number of protesters gathered in front of the Presidential Palace on Baghramyan Avenue. Some demonstrators were detained.

On 21 September 2013, the 22nd anniversary of Armenia's independence, thousands poured into streets to protests Armenia's government decision to join the Customs Union of Belarus, Kazakhstan and Russia. Minor clashes took place between the protesters with policemen, who blocked the Baghramyan Avenue near the Presidential Palace. The rally began in Freedom Square and was not organized by any political party.

On 29 November Soviet era dissident Paruyr Hayrikyan held a rally in Yerevan's Freedom Square against Armenia's decision to join the Russian led Customs Union. During his speech Hayrikyan denounced the move and stated "What else do the Russian imperialists have to do for us to realize they are our greatest enemies?"

On 2 December, during Russia's President Vladimir Putin's visit 500 to 1,000 protesters marched through central Yerevan against Armenia's plan to join the Customs Union. Their march to the Presidential Palace was blocked by the riot police.

On 23 December, hundreds of protesters gathered in front of the National Assembly building in Baghramyan Avenue. The ruling Republican party ratified the gas deal with Russia by which "Gazprom will gain full control of Armenia's natural gas distribution company ArmRosgazprom" and "will also control all of Armenia's gas imports until 2043." The four opposition parties boycotted the voting by leaving the chamber.

=== Shant Harutyunyan (5 November) ===
On 31 October 2013 Shant Harutyunyan, a "flamboyant" opposition activist, began a sit-in in the Freedom Square openly calling for a revolution.

On 5 November 2013 (the Gunpowder Plot day), Shant Harutyunyan addressed tens of his supporters (many wearing Guy Fawkes masks) who gathered at the Freedom Square. He openly called for the seizure of the Presidential Palace and other key government buildings. Armed with wooden sticks and magnesium flash bombs, Harutyunyan led his supporters to the Presidential Palace on Baghramyan Avenue. Just outside the Freedom Square, on Yerevan's central-most Mashtots Avenue, the riot police reacted by arresting the protesters "as a result of the scuffle that ensued and in which the homemade explosives and flares were used by the protesters." Around twenty people were detained.

The ruling Republic party condemned the act, while Armen Martirosyan of the opposition Heritage party said that the "society is greatly unhappy with the authorities and that discontent is slowly yielding extreme results." Armenian National Congress speaker Levon Zurabyan said that "there is nothing surprising about the fact that there will be people who would consider solving the issue by the rule of law to be impossible and would look for other ways."

== See also ==
- Armenia–Russia relations
- Mashtots Park Movement (2012)
- 2011 Armenian protests
- 2008 Armenian presidential election protests
- List of protests in the 21st century
