= Armenian Center for National and International Studies =

Independent research centre based in Yerevan, Armenia

- Ազգային և միջազգային հետազոտությունների հայկական կենտրոն
- ACNIS logo
- Abbreviation: ACNIS
- Formation: 1994
- Founder: Raffi Hovannisian
- Type: Research center
- Headquarters: Yerevan
- Region served: Armenia
- Website: acnis.am

The Armenian Center for National and International Studies (ACNIS) (Armenian: Ազգային և միջազգային հետազոտությունների հայկական կենտրոն, romanized: Azgayin yev mijazgayin hetazotut’yunneri haykakan kentron) is an independent research center based in Yerevan.

== Foundation ==
The ACNIS is the institutional initiative of Raffi Hovannisian, Armenia's former Minister of Foreign Affairs and founder of the Heritage party. Founded in 1994, the institution focuses on foreign and public policy issues. Richard Giragosian served as Director of the center (2009-2011).

== Publications ==
The center publishes a variety of journals and papers, including:

- Hayatsk Yerevanits, Monthly Journal of Public Policy, since 1995.
- Prospects for regional and transregional cooperation and the resolution of conflicts, report.
- Armenia 2020: A strategy paper for development and security (in Armenian), 2002.
- Armenian-Azerbaijani relations: Realities and prospects, by Alexander Grigorian.
- Armenia-Turkey: Models of trade and economic relations, by Dr. Toros Torosian.
- The politics of Genocide: State policy and national perceptions, by Dr. Stepan Poghosian; etc.

== See also ==
- Foreign relations of Armenia
