= Hello Yerevan =

Hello Yerevan Բարև Երևան
- Leader: Armen Martirosyan
- Founded: 2013
- Headquarters: Yerevan
- Ideology: Anti-corruption

Hello Yerevan (Armenian: Բարև Երևան, romanized: Barev Yerevan), was a political alliance in Armenia. It was led by Armen Martirosyan.

== History ==
The Hello Yerevan alliance was established prior to the 2013 Yerevan City Council election with the intent to participate in the municipal elections. The alliance mainly consisted of members from the Heritage party and included some members from the Democratic Way Party, the Democratic Homeland Party, the Conservative Party, and other political activists.

Raffi Hovannisian, leader of the Heritage party launched the alliance's first-day of campaigning with a tree planting ceremony in central Yerevan. Meanwhile, Armen Martirosyan, also a member of the Heritage party, was nominated to lead the alliance and was the alliance's candidate for Mayor of Yerevan.

The alliance made clear that they were opposed to the rule of the Republican Party of Armenia and announced that they would be open to working alongside other opposition parties, namely the Armenian National Congress and the Armenian Revolutionary Federation. However, both of these parties rejected cooperating with Hello Yerevan.

Following the election, the alliance came in third place receiving 8.48% of the vote. The alliance won six seats in the Yerevan City Council.

The alliance did not participate in any subsequent elections and has since dissolved.

== Ideology ==
The alliance campaigned on anti-corruption platform, pledging to eliminate the rule of oligarchs and increase government transparency. The alliance also vowed to improve urban planning, sanitation, and transportation in Yerevan.

== Electoral record ==
=== Local elections ===
Following the 2013 Yerevan City Council election, the alliance came in third place, winning 8.48% of the vote.

== See also ==
- Programs of political parties in Armenia
- 2013 Armenian protests
