= Levon Marashlian =

American historian, professor, and scholar

- Born: December 18, 1948 (age 77); Beirut, Lebanon
- Occupations: historian, professor, and scholar

Levon Marashlian (Armenian: Լևոն Մարաշլյան; born December 18, 1948) is an American historian, professor, and scholar. His scholarly work has largely focused on Armenian, Russian, and Middle-Eastern history. He has participated in various debates, lectures, and conferences throughout the world. He is currently a professor of history at Glendale Community College.

== Life ==
Of Armenian descent, Marashlian was born in Beirut, Lebanon in 1948, and relocated to Chicago, Illinois, in 1956. During the Vietnam War, Marashlian served in the 82nd Airborne Division (United States) as an infantryman from 1968-69. He received his B.A. (1974) from the University of Illinois, Chicago, and his M.A. (1978) and Ph.D. (1992) from the University of California, Los Angeles. His Ph.D. dissertation was titled, "The Armenian Question from Sèvres to Lausanne: Economics and Morality in American and British policies," parts of which also appeared in Turkish translation in 2000 as Ermeni Sorunu Ve Türk-Amerikan İlişkileri (Belge Yayinlari).

He was one of the founders of an Armenian Congress in 1981 which served Armenians throughout Southern California. One of the main aims of the congress is to have more Armenian-Americans become politically active.

On 15 May 1996, Marashlian provided testimony in support of Armenian genocide recognition in a panel hearing of the United States House Committee on Foreign Affairs. He noted that, "Those who today deny the Armenian Genocide are resorting to academically unsound revisionism."

Marashlian was instrumental in bringing about the Armenian Genocide curriculum in California public schools when serving as an adviser to the California Department of Education Curriculum Committee in 1987.

He has lectured in many countries throughout the world, including Armenia and Karabakh. In 1990, Marashlian also participated in an academic debate in Ankara, Turkey which dealt with the issue of the Armenian genocide and Turkish-Armenian relations.

Marashlian's writings and opinions have been featured in several newspapers throughout the world including the Los Angeles Times, Washington Times, The Jewish Daily Forward, Houston Chronicle, Hurriyet Daily News, and others.

Dr. Marashlian is Professor of Ethnic Studies, History, and Political Science at Glendale Community College in Glendale, California.

== Works ==
- Politics and Demography: Armenians, Turks and Kurds in the Ottoman Empire. Zoryan Institute. (1991)
- "Finishing the Genocide: Cleansing Turkey of Armenian Survivors, 1920-1923," in Richard Hovannisian, ed., Remembrance and Denial: The Case of the Armenian Genocide (Detroit, 1998)

== See also ==
- Witnesses and testimonies of the Armenian genocide
