= United Liberal National Party =

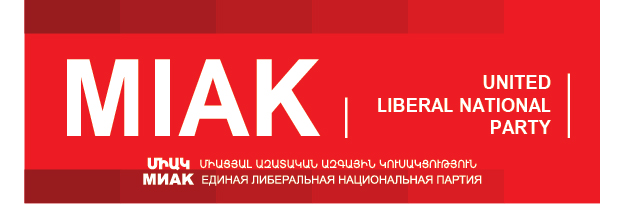
- Leader: Levon Martirosyan
- Founded: 2007; 19 years ago
- Headquarters: Yerevan
- Ideology: National liberalism Pro-Europeanism
- Political position: Centre-right

The United Liberal National Party (Armenian: Միացյալ Ազատական Ազգային Կուսակցություն, Miatsyal Azatakan Azgayin Kusaktsutyun), also known by its Armenian initials (Armenian: ՄԻԱԿ, MIAK), is an Armenian national liberal political party established in 2007 and headquartered in Yerevan, Armenia. Co-founder Levon Martirosyan was elected as an MP from the Republican Party of Armenia in 2012.

== Ideology ==
The party maintains a centre-right political position. It advocates for the peaceful resolution to the Nagorno-Karabakh conflict, fighting against domestic corruption, strengthening Armenia's democracy, liberalization of the economy, deepening progress towards Armenia’s European integration and maintaining positive relations with the EU, the United States, Russia, Iran and Georgia.

== Parliamentary elections ==
Having announced the goal to present a political presence and form a new political agenda through the election process, MIAK conducted its pre-election campaign by presenting a fundamental reforms program. Their agenda was included within former President Serge Sargsyan's pre-election program.

Following the 2007 Armenian parliamentary election, the party won just 0.20% of the popular vote. Following the election campaign, although MIAK did not collect enough votes necessary to gain representation in the National Assembly of Armenia, the party and its youth-wing, were able to achieve a political presence. As a result, the President of Armenia, Serge Sargsyan, appointed a number of young professionals from MIAK in the public administration system of Armenia.

MIAK was very active during the 2008 Armenian presidential election and party volunteers campaigned door-to-door. This entailed nearly 300 MIAK activists visiting more than 240,000 apartments in the capital Yerevan and presenting their views supporting Serzh Sargsyan for presidency.

The party currently has no representation in the National Assembly and did not participate in the 2018 Armenian parliamentary election.

== Youth ==
MIAK is mainly composed of young people, who cooperate with and support numerous youth and student organizations in implementing different projects, initiatives and ideas. Through this cooperation, the MIASIN (Armenian: ՄԻԱՍԻՆ, Together) youth movement was created.

== Membership ==
Any Armenian citizen 18 years old and above, who accepts the MIAK Charter, can voluntarily become a MIAK member. Already registered MIAK members cannot be a member of any other political party.

== See also ==
- Politics of Armenia
- Programs of political parties in Armenia
