= Armen Martirosyan (Heritage party politician) =

Armenian politician

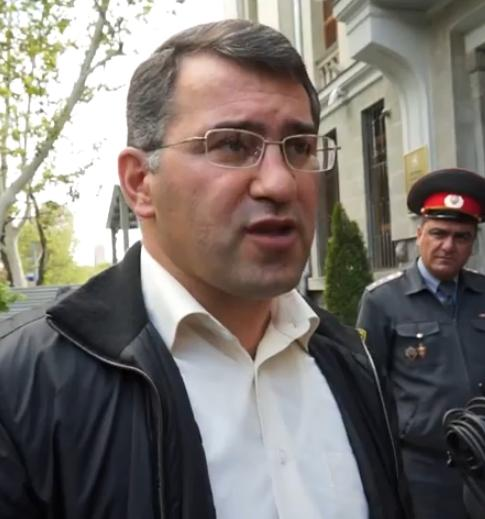

Vice-Chairman of the Heritage Party

Personal details
- Born: 30 September 1973 Yerevan, Armenia SSR, Soviet Union
- Party: Heritage
- Education: Armenian State Institute of Physical Culture
- Occupation: judo coach, physical training teacher, senior professor

Military service
- Branch/service: Armed Forces of Armenia
- Years of service: 1994—1995

Armen Martirosyan (Armenian: Արմեն Մարտիրոսյան; born 30 September 1973) is an Armenian politician from the Heritage party.

== Early life ==
Armen Martirosyan was born in Yerevan, Armenia SSR, Soviet Union on 30 September 1973. In 1994, he graduated from the Combat Sports faculty of the Armenian State Institute of Physical Culture. He is a judo coach, physical training teacher, pedagogical sciences candidate and senior professor. Martirosyan then served in the Armed Forces of Armenia in 1994 and 1995. Afterwards, he returned to the State Institute of Physical Culture as a professor. He became a senior professor in 2001 and, from 2002 to 2004, worked as head of the division of Foreign Relations. Martirosyan is an author of 20 scientific articles and a school textbook.

== Political career ==
Martirosyan is the vice-chairman of the Heritage party headed by Raffi Hovannisian. On 12 May 2007, he was elected as a Deputy of the National Assembly by proportional electoral system from the Heritage party.

=== 2013 Yerevan City Council election ===
On 5 May 2013, Martirosyan was the Heritage mayoral candidate for the 2013 Yerevan City Council election, as part of the Hello Yerevan alliance. Hello Yerevan received 8.48% of the votes and won 6 seats in the Yerevan City Council. The elections contained plenty of violations according to most observation groups. The opposition parties accused the ruling Republican Party of Armenia for electoral fraud throughout the election day.

Martirosyan stated on 24 September 2013 that reform is no longer possible and a revolution in Armenia would be inevitable.

He was arrested in July 2016, during the 2016 Yerevan hostage crisis.

== Personal life ==
He is married with two children.
