= United National Initiative (Armenia) =

United National Initiative Ազգային միացյալ նախաձեռնություն
- Leader: Shant Harutyunyan
- Founded: 2021
- Headquarters: Yerevan
- Ideology: Anti-Russian; Armenian nationalism

The United National Initiative (Armenian: Ազգային միացյալ նախաձեռնություն, romanized: Miats’yal azgayin nakhadzerrnut’yun) is an Armenian political party. The party was established on 27 April 2021 and is led by Shant Harutyunyan.

== History ==
The party was founded during the 2020–2021 Armenian protests and does not maintain any political representation within the National Assembly. The party currently acts as an extra-parliamentary force. The party had confirmed it would participate in the 2021 Armenian parliamentary elections, but ultimately failed to register.

== Ideology ==
The party rejects Russian interference in Armenia's domestic affairs. The party has called for direct assistance from the European Union and the United States in order to prevent former Armenian President Robert Kocharyan from becoming prime minister. The party believes that Kocharyan is backed by Russia and blames Russia and Turkey for instigating the 2020 Nagorno-Karabakh war. Shant Harutyunyan is also critical of Prime Minister Nikol Pashinyan and former President Serzh Sargsyan.

== See also ==
- Programs of political parties in Armenia
