= Richard Giragosian =

Armenian American academic (1965–2026)

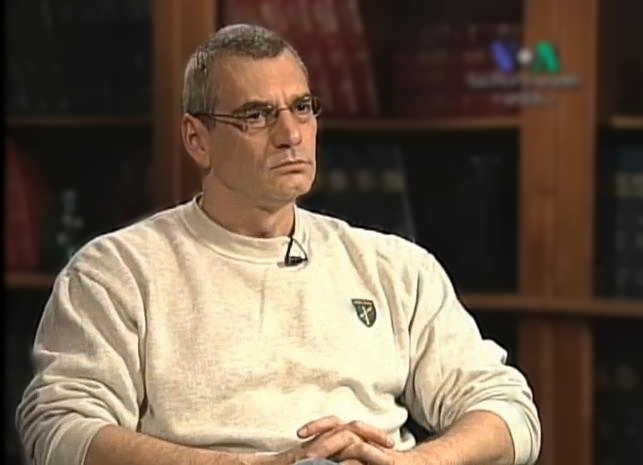
Richard Giragosian

Richard Giragosian (Armenian: Ռիչարդ Կիրակոսյան; January 8, 1965 – September 19, 2026) was an Armenian American academic. He served as both a contributing analyst for Al Jazeera and the Asia Times. Giragosian served as a consultant for the Asian Development Bank, the European Union Delegation to Armenia, the French Ministry of Defence, the Organization for Security and Cooperation in Europe and the United States Department of State. In addition, he wrote for the European Council on Foreign Relations, Le Monde, the Moscow Times, and the Turkish Policy Quarterly.

== Life and career ==
Giragosian was born in Providence, Rhode Island, on January 8, 1965. From 2002 to 2006, Giragosian served as a guest lecturer for the United States Army Special Forces at the John F. Kennedy Special Warfare Center and School at Fort Bragg. For nine years, Giragosian served as a professional staff member of the Joint Economic Committee (JEC) of the U.S. Congress and was the committee's principal staffer for the former Soviet Union and China, responsible for organizing congressional hearings and conducting analytical studies for members of congress. Giragosian also served as the Director of the Armenian Center for National and International Studies.

Giragosian died from a brain haemorrhage in Istanbul, on September 19, 2026, at the age of 61.
