= 2007 Armenian parliamentary election =

Parliamentary election in Armenia

- May 12, 2007
- All 131 seats in the National Assembly; 66 seats needed for a majority
Party	Leader	Vote %	Seats	+/–
Republican	Serzh Sargsyan	33.91	59	+26
PAP	Gagik Tsarukyan	15.13	25	New
ARF	Vahan Hovhannisyan	13.16	16	+5
Orinats Yerkir	Artur Baghdasaryan	7.05	10	−9
Heritage	Raffi Hovannisian	6.00	7	New
Dashink Party		–	1	New
Independent	–	–	13	−24
This lists parties that won seats. See the complete results below.
Prime Minister before	Elected Prime Minister
Serzh Sargsyan; Republican	Serzh Sargsyan; Republican

Elections were held in Armenia on 12 May 2007 for all of the seats in the unicameral National Assembly. There were 1,364 candidates running for 131 seats, 41 of which were single-member constituency seats, with the remaining 90 being allocated by a proportional party-list system. Members of the National Assembly (Azgayin Zhoghov) serve five-year terms.

The BBC reported a turnout of almost 60% 1,389,425 of the estimated 2,317,810 registered voters.

== Results ==
The electoral threshold was 5%, which is to say that no proportional seats would be assigned to parties that did not receive at least 5% of the vote. In this election, five parties accomplished that feat: the Republican Party of Armenia (33.91%), Prosperous Armenia (15.13%), the Armenian Revolutionary Federation (13.16%), Orinats Yerkir (7.05%) and Heritage (6.00%).

The Republican Party gained ten seats, rising from 31 to 41. Prosperous Armenia went from zero seats to 18. The Armenian Revolutionary Federation gained five seats for a total of 16. Orinats Yerkir, on the other hand, lost 11 seats, keeping eight. Heritage went from zero to seven seats. Three parties lost all their seats: National Unity lost its nine, the United Labour Party lost six, and the Republican Party of Armenia lost its sole seat.

There is a gender quota, and 12 women were elected.

== Monitoring ==
The Organization for Security and Co-operation in Europe judged the elections to have "demonstrated improvement" over previous parliamentary elections, but said "the stated intention by the Armenian authorities to conduct an election in line with OSCE commitments and international standards was not fully realized."

Critics and opposition politicians had announced their fears that the polls would not be democratic, despite officials' reassurances that the changes to the voting laws would ensure a more democratic election than the greatly criticised 2003 one.

Party	Proportional			Constituency			Total seats	+/–
Party	Votes	%	Seats	Votes	%	Seats	Total seats	+/–
Republican Party of Armenia	458,258	33.91	41	429,423	33.93	18	59	+26
Prosperous Armenia	204,483	15.13	18	216,977	17.14	7	25	New
Armenian Revolutionary Federation	177,907	13.16	16	3,237	0.26	0	16	+5
Orinats Yerkir	95,324	7.05	8	93,999	7.43	2	10	–9
Heritage	81,048	6.00	7				7	New
United Labour Party	59,271	4.39	0				0	–6
National Unity	49,864	3.69	0	8,341	0.66	0	0	–9
New Times	47,060	3.48	0				0	New
People's Party	37,044	2.74	0	9,523	0.75	0	0	New
Union Party	32,943	2.44	0				0	New
People's Party of Armenia	22,762	1.68	0				0	0
Hanrapetutyun Party	22,288	1.65	0				0	–1
Impeachment Union	17,475	1.29	0				0	New
Armenian Communist Party	8,792	0.65	0	568	0.04	0	0	0
National Democratic Party	8,556	0.63	0				0	New
Direct Democracy Party	8,351	0.62	0				0	New
National Accord Party	4,199	0.31	0				0	New
Democratic Party of Armenia	3,686	0.27	0				0	New
Christian-People's Renaissance Party	3,433	0.25	0				0	New
United Liberal National Party	2,739	0.20	0				0	New
Marxist Party of Armenia	2,660	0.20	0	7,638	0.60	0	0	New
Youth Party	2,291	0.17	0	10,233	0.81	0	0	New
Social Democrat Hunchakian Party	989	0.07	0				0	New
Dashink Party				36,746	2.90	1	1	New
Democratic Way Party				13,338	1.05	0	0	New
Pan-Armenian National Movement				7,764	0.61	0	0	0
Christian Democratic Union				6,898	0.55	0	0	0
Liberal Progressive Party of Armenia				6,886	0.54	0	0	New
Constitutional Right Union Party				3,628	0.29	0	0	New
Bloc of National Democrats				1,440	0.11	0	0	New
Armenian Motherland Party				1,356	0.11	0	0	New
Hayreniq Party				1,269	0.10	0	0	New
Progressive United Communist Party				1,237	0.10	0	0	New
Freedom Struggle Veterans' Union				1,043	0.08	0	0	New
Independents				404,121	31.93	13	13	–24
Total	1,351,423	100.00	90	1,265,665	100.00	41	131	0
Valid votes	1,351,423	97.26		1,265,665	94.87			
Invalid/blank votes	38,002	2.74		68,402	5.13			
Total votes	1,389,425	100.00		1,334,067	100.00			
Registered voters/turnout	2,319,722	59.90		2,278,404	58.55			
Source: Central Electoral Commission of Armenia, CLEA
