= Democratic Way Party =

Democratic Way Party Ժողովրդավարական ուղի կուսակցություն
- Leader: Manuel Gasparyan
- Founded: 2006
- Headquarters: Yerevan
- National Assembly: 0 / 107

The Democratic Way Party (Armenian: Ժողովրդավարական ուղի կուսակցություն, romanized: Zhoghovrdavarakan ughi kusakts’ut’yun), also known as the People's Way party or Democratic Path, is a political party in Armenia. It is led by Manuel Gasparyan.

== History ==
The Democratic Way Party was founded in 2006 and is led by Manuel Gasparyan, a former member of parliament and son of Manuk Gasparyan, the founder of the party. The party was a former member of the Armenian National Congress. The party currently has no representation in the National Assembly and acts as an extra-parliamentary force.

Prior to the 2018 Armenian parliamentary election, the party announced its support and endorsement of the Sasna Tsrer Pan-Armenian Party.

The party boycotted the 2021 Armenian parliamentary elections, claiming the election would be rigged. In December 2021, the party signed a declaration with over a dozen other political parties calling on the government to respect democracy and human rights in the country.

== Electoral record ==
=== National elections ===
The party participated in the 2007 Armenian parliamentary election, winning 1.05% of the vote.

The party participated in the 2012 Armenian parliamentary election, winning 0.36% of the vote.

=== Local elections ===
Several party members participated in the 2013 Yerevan City Council election, under the Heritage party's Hello Yerevan alliance. The alliance came in third place, winning 8.48% of the vote.

The party participated in the 2018 Yerevan City Council election and nominated Manuel Gasparyan to run for mayor of Yerevan. Following the election, the party won just 0.22% of the popular vote, failing to win any seats in the Yerevan City Council. The party released a statement after the election congratulating Prime Minister Nikol Pashinyan's My Step Alliance.

== See also ==
- Programs of political parties in Armenia
