= Union Party (Armenia) =

- Headquarters: Yerevan

The Union Party' (Armenian: "Դաշինք" կուսակցություն; "Dashink" kusaktsutiun) was a political party in Armenia.

== History ==
Following the 2007 Armenian parliamentary elections, the party did not win any seats in the National Assembly with a popular vote of 2.44%. The party has not participated in any subsequent elections and has since dissolved.

== See also ==
- Politics of Armenia
- Programs of political parties in Armenia
