= Raffi Hovannisian =

Armenian politician (born 1959)

- Րաֆֆի Հովհաննիսյան
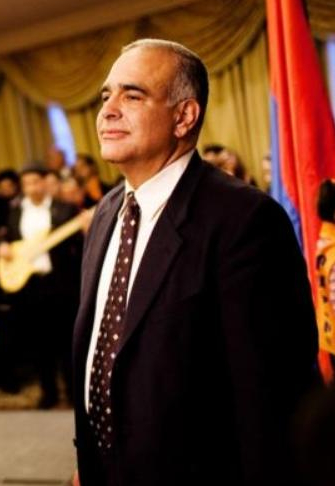

Leader of the Heritage Party
- Incumbent
- Assumed office 2002
- Preceded by: position established

Minister of Foreign Affairs of Armenia
- In office 7 November 1991 – 16 October 1992
- President: Levon Ter-Petrosyan
- Preceded by: position established
- Succeeded by: Vahan Papazyan

Personal details
- Born: November 20, 1959 (age 66) Fresno, California, U.S.
- Party: Heritage
- Spouse: Armenouhi Hovannisian (m. 1985)
- Relations: Richard Hovannisian (father)
- Children: Garin, Daron, Van, Shushi, Armen-Richard
- Education: University of California, Berkeley; University of California, Los Angeles; Tufts University; Georgetown University

Raffi K. Richardi Hovannisian (Armenian: Րաֆֆի Կ. Ռիչարդի Հովհաննիսյան; Western Armenian: Րաֆֆի Կ. Ռիչարդի Յովհաննէսեան; born 20 November 1959) is an Armenian politician, the first Foreign Minister of Armenia and the founding leader of the national liberal Heritage party. He is the founder of the Armenian Center for National and International Studies, the country's first independent research center.

Hovannisian, a descendant of Armenian genocide survivors, was born in Fresno, California to a family of professors. He moved to Armenia with his family in 1990 and was appointed as the first Minister of Foreign Affairs of the newly independent Armenia by then-President Levon Ter-Petrosyan. In 2002, Hovannisian founded the Heritage party, which won 6% of the popular vote in the 2007 parliamentary election.

In 2013, Hovannisian was one of the seven candidates at the presidential election and came in second with 37% vote. He claimed victory due to alleged electoral fraud. In days following the election, protests took place both in Yerevan (Freedom Square in particular) and other cities and towns throughout Armenia. Hovannisian urged Sargsyan to accept "people's victory" and concede his defeat. Hovannisian called the movement 'Barevolution', a portmanteau of 'barev' (բարև, 'hello') and 'revolution', referring to his habit of walking up to people and greeting them during the election campaign. The protests gradually faded by April of that year.

== Early life and education ==
Raffi Hovannisian was born in Fresno, California, on 20 November 1959, to Richard Hovannisian and Vartiter Hovannisian (née Kotcholosian), both children of Armenian genocide survivors. Raffi Hovannisian attended the Palisades Charter High School in Los Angeles, from where he graduated in 1977. In his youth years Hovannisian was a member and later a leader of the California chapter of the Armenian Youth Federation, which is the youth organization of the Armenian Revolutionary Federation.

Hovannisian is a graduate of the University of California, Berkeley (1977–78) from the Department of Political Science. In 1979–80, he attended the University of California, Los Angeles, Department of Armenian History. In 1982, Hovanissian graduated from The Fletcher School of Law and Diplomacy of the Tufts University with an M.A. in international law and diplomacy. In 1985, he received his J.D. from the Georgetown University Law Center.

Hovannisian worked in the Tufts University as a lecturer of Armenian History from 1981–82. From 1985 to 1989, he worked as an International Lawyer and Civil Litigator in the firms of Hill, Farrer and Burrill, Whitman & Ransom, Stroock & Stroock & Lavan, and Coudert Brothers.

== Emigration to Armenia ==
In October 1988, Hovannisian wrote an article for the Los Angeles Times supporting the Karabakh movement. He was in Soviet Armenia in December 1988, when an earthquake shook northwestern parts of the country. In February 1990, he settled in a one-bedroom apartment off Azizbekov Square (now Sakharov Square) in capital Yerevan. Hovannisian was the Yerevan office director of the Armenian Assembly of America. His family moved to Yerevan in fall 1990.

Hovannisian gave up his United States citizenship on 23 April 2001 to be eligible to become an Armenian citizen. On January 9, 2003, the Armenian court rejected Hovannisian's claims on certifying that he has been an Armenian citizen for the past 10 years, which is a requirement in running for president. Thus, he was effectively put out of his way in participating in 2003 presidential election.

== Minister of Foreign Affairs ==
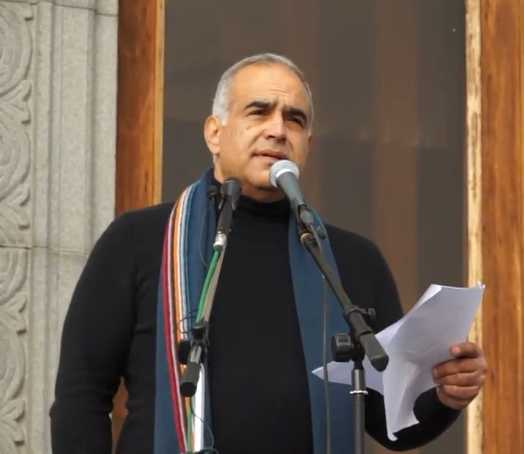
Hovannisian in 2013

On 7 November 1991 Raffi Hovannisian was appointed as the first Foreign Minister of Armenia. On March 2, 1992 as the Foreign Minister of Armenia, Hovannisian raised the Armenian tricolor at the United Nations headquarters in New York. He served in that position until October 16, 1992, when he was forced to resign, because he and President Levon Ter-Petrosyan took two very different approaches to Armenian national issues.

In September 1992 the Los Angeles Times wrote "Hovannisian's citizenship makes little difference to his fans, however. A recent poll in the Armenian newspaper Epokha found that he enjoyed a mind-boggling 96% approval rating, more than President Ter-Petrosyan. Even among the long faces of a Yerevan bread line, people turned thumbs up when asked about him."

However, Hovannisian was later dismissed in 1992 from his position as Foreign Minister due to his disagreements with Ter-Petrosyan on the issue of relations with Turkey. Specifically, he was critical of Ter-Petrosyan for his urgent desire for normalization of relations with Turkey without stressing the issue of the Armenian Genocide. The final straw occurred when Hovannisian chose to bring up the issue while in Istanbul in late 1992 on a state visit.

== Heritage ==
=== 2007 parliamentary election ===
The Heritage party was the only opposition party to pass the 5% threshold during the 2007 parliamentary election. According to official results, Hovannisian's party earned over 81,000 votes or 6% of the total vote guaranteeing 7 seats at the Armenian National Assembly. However, according to Azg daily's online poll, Heritage had the highest rating in the public with around 25% support. Two months after the election, in July 2007 the approval rating of Raffi Hovannisian was 82% in a US-funded poll.

Hovannisian has spearheaded the campaign to get Armenia to recognize the Nagorno-Karabakh Republic. On 28 August 2007, he introduced to the National Assembly a bill on a formal recognition of the Nagorno-Karabakh Republic.

=== 2008 presidential election ===
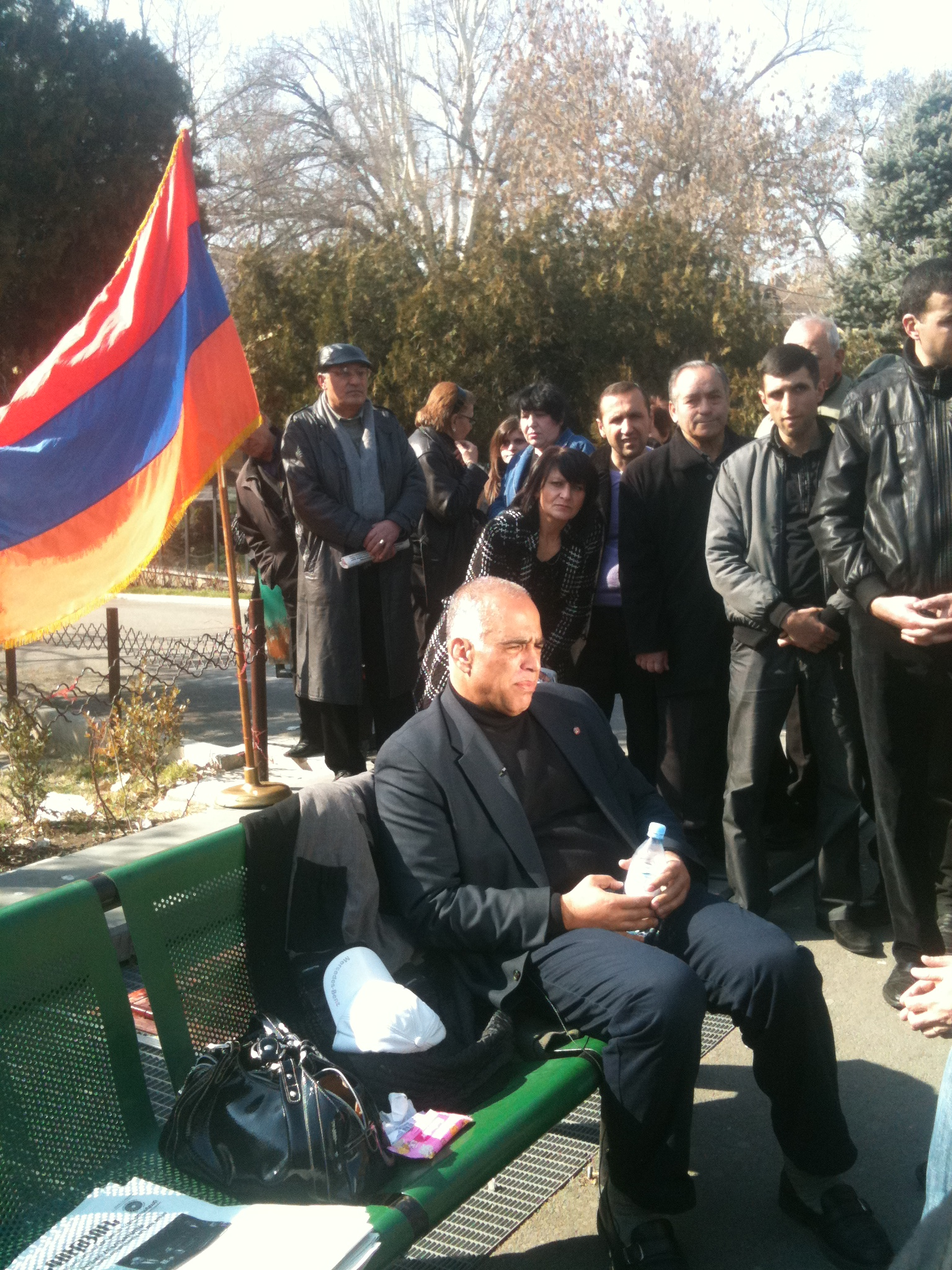
Raffi Hovannisian at Yerevan's Freedom Square during his "Fast for Freedom" hunger-strike, March 2011.

=== Fast for Freedom ===
In 2011, Hovannisian encouraged a more assertive Armenian foreign policy, calling for the restitution of territories from both Azerbaijan and Turkey, and support for the rights of the Armenian minority in Georgia.

After regional unrest spurred Armenian merchants to demonstrate in Yerevan against a ban on street trading, Heritage and other political parties began to organize more ambitious rallies aimed at forcing broad governmental changes. On 15 March 2011, hoping to draw attention to his party's cause, Hovannisian began a public hunger strike in a small protest camp in Yerevan's Freedom Square. The unity of the opposition was strained when Levon Ter-Petrosyan, leader of the Armenian National Congress, led demonstrators into Freedom Square two nights later and allegedly ignored Hovannisian and his supporters. Hovannisian ended his hunger strike on 30 March, but has remained active in protests against President Serzh Sargsyan and his government.

=== 2012 parliamentary election ===
Hovannisian's Heritage party won 5 seats to the National Assembly with 86,998 votes.

=== 2017 parliamentary election ===
The Heritage party formed part of the ORO Alliance. Following the election, Heritage lost all political representation in the National Assembly, gaining just 2.07% of the popular vote.

== 2013 presidential election ==
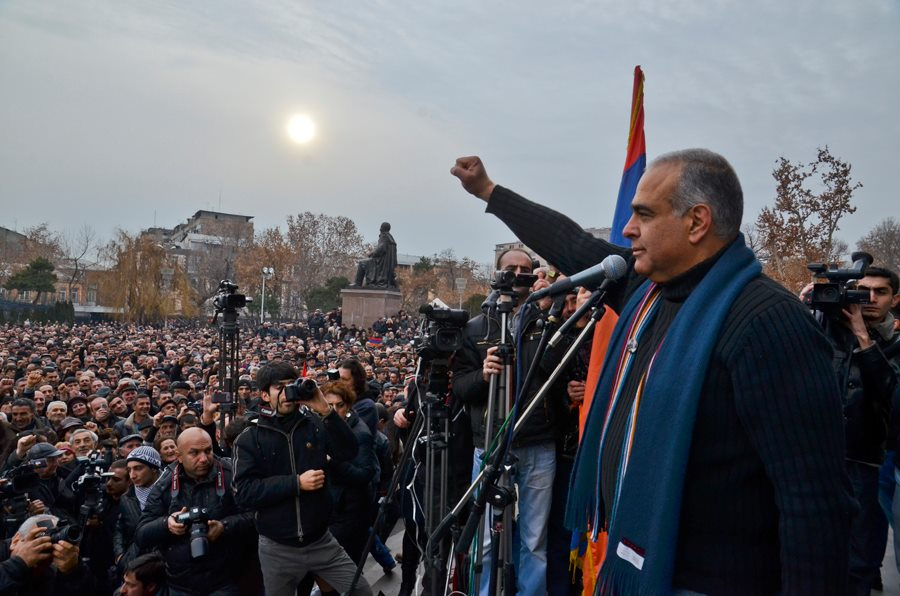
Hovannisian addressing the crowd at Yerevan's Freedom Square on 22 February 2013

Hovannisian announced about his decision to run for president in early November 2012. By late December 2012, it was clear that Armenia's first president and main opposition figure Levon Ter-Petrosyan refused to run for president. Hovannisian was perceived to be the main challenger of incumbent president Serzh Sargsyan, however, many doubted Hovannisian's ability to bring about government change in Armenia.

The election campaign started on 21 January 2013 and ended on 16 February. 17 February was an election silence day. Hovannisian ran on a nationalist platform, with strong views on the Armenian genocide recognition and Nagorno-Karabakh conflict with Azerbaijan.

== Personal life ==
Raffi Hovannisian married his wife Armenouhi in 1985. They have five children, 4 sons and 1 daughter. One of his sons is Garin K. Hovannisian, a journalist and filmmaker. Hovannisian is fluent in Armenian, English, Russian and French.

His wife Armenouhi K. Hovannisian is the executive director of Junior Achievement of Armenia, an affiliate of Junior Achievement Worldwide.
