= Freedom Square, Yerevan =

Square in Yerevan, Armenia

Coordinates: 40°11′07″N 44°30′54″E

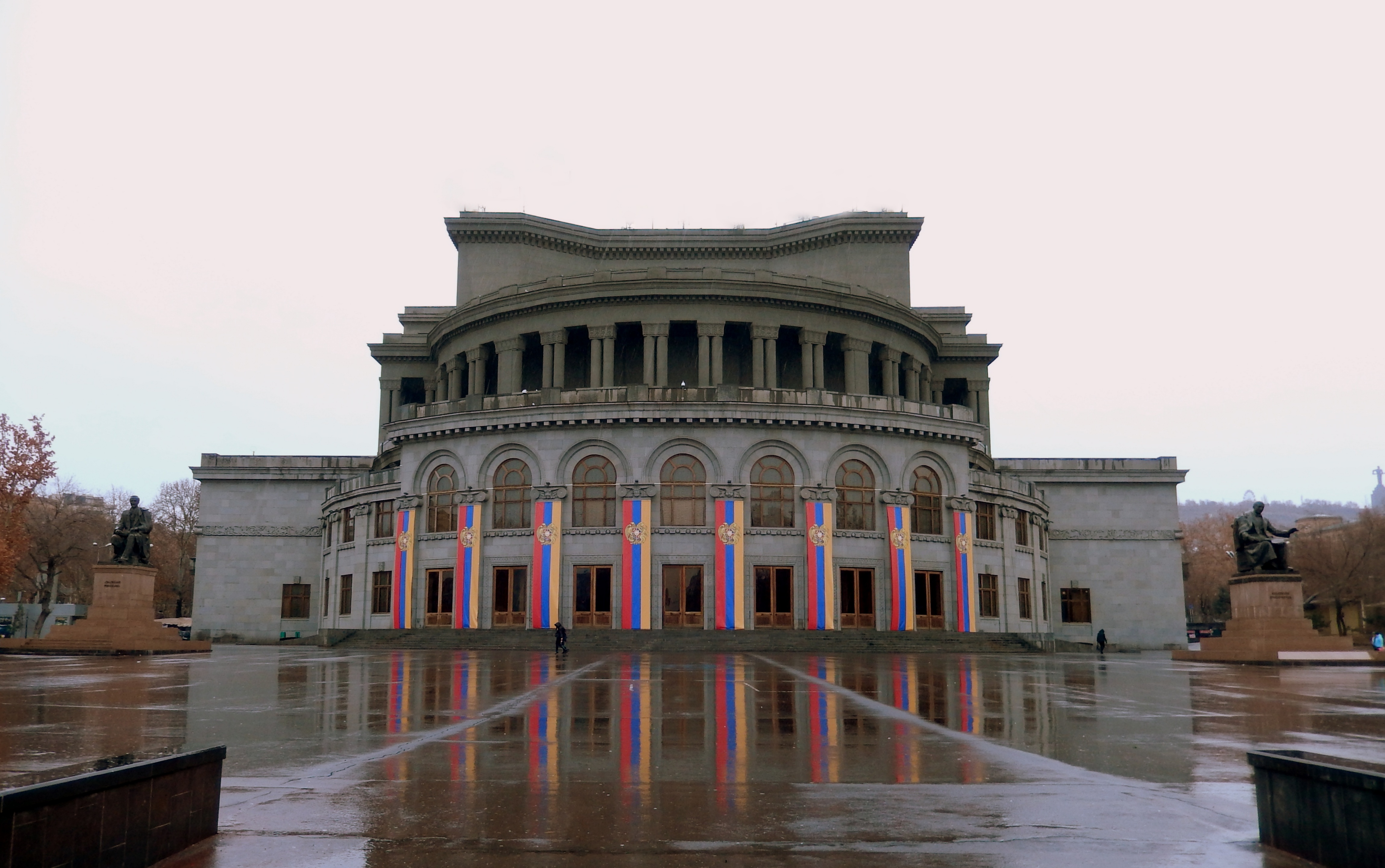
Freedom Square General view

The Freedom Square or Liberty Square (Armenian: Ազատության հրապարակ, Azatut'yan hraparak), also known as Opera Square and, formerly, Theatre Square (Թատերական հրապարակ, T'aterakan hraparak) until 1991, is a town square located in Kentron (Center) district of Yerevan, Armenia. The square is part of the Yerevan Opera Theater complex, located just to the south of the main opera building, between the opera park and the Swan lake. Along with the Republic Square, the Freedom Square is one of the two main squares in central Yerevan. It is bordered with four streets: Tumanyan Street, Teryan Street, Sayat Nova Avenue and Mashtots Avenue. The statues of writer Hovhannes Tumanyan and composer Alexander Spendiaryan are located in the square.

== History ==
The square was built together with the building of the Alexander Spendiaryan Opera and Ballet Theater. Alexander Spendiaryan's grave is located in the park surrounding the square. In 1957, bronze-granite statues of Hovhannes Tumanyan and Alexander Spendiaryan were installed on the square to mark the 40th anniversary of the October Revolution.

== Park near the square ==
On the eastern side of the square at the intersection of Tumanyan and Teryan streets, an artificial reservoir was built in the early 1960s - “Swan Lake”, reminiscent of Lake Sevan in shape. On July 4, 2003, near the square, on the shore of Swan Lake, a monument was erected in memory of the outstanding Armenian and Soviet composer Arno Babajanyan. In March 2019, Yerevan City Hall dismantled a number of cafes built in the green area of the square. On November 4, 2022, in honor of the 100th anniversary of conductor Ohan Duryan, his monument was unveiled near the square’s park. The author of the monument is sculptor Getik Baghdasaryan.

== In politics ==
Due to a tradition of demonstrations at the square, it has been described as a "symbol of democracy" in Armenia.

The square has variously been estimated to be able to hold 42,000–45,000 to 50,000 people.

=== 1988: Karabakh movement ===
The semi-circular square is known for its prominent role in modern history of Armenia. Since the Karabakh movement in February 1988, the Freedom Square has become a center of popular demonstrations. To suppress the demonstrations the square was closed down several times within 1988 by Soviet police and military forces.

=== Post-election protests ===
After Armenia's independence in 1991 the square has been the main location of anti-government rallies, especially following presidential elections in 1996, 2003, 2008, and 2013.

In the aftermath of the disputed 2008 presidential election, thousands of supporters of opposition leader and Armenia's first president Levon Ter-Petrosyan gathered in the square and began sit-ins. In the early morning of March 1, 2008 these peaceful protests were violently dispersed by the police and the square was closed down for civilians. For around 20 days, the square remained under occupation by police and armed forces to enforce the state of emergency. Subsequently, it was closed down for rallies for over three years, until March 17, 2011 when Ter-Petrosyan's Armenian National Congress staged a large rally.

== Underground parking lot ==
On August 28, 2008 the Armenian government made a decision to start a construction of an underground parking lot beneath the square to relieve the surrounding streets where parked cars often complicate the traffic. The opposition claimed the decision was intended to prevent demonstration there, although the government denied these allegations. The three-storey parking lot for up to 500 cars was opened on May 24, 2010 in attendance of Mayor Gagik Beglaryan and President Serzh Sargsyan. The project cost about $10.5 million.

== Gallery ==
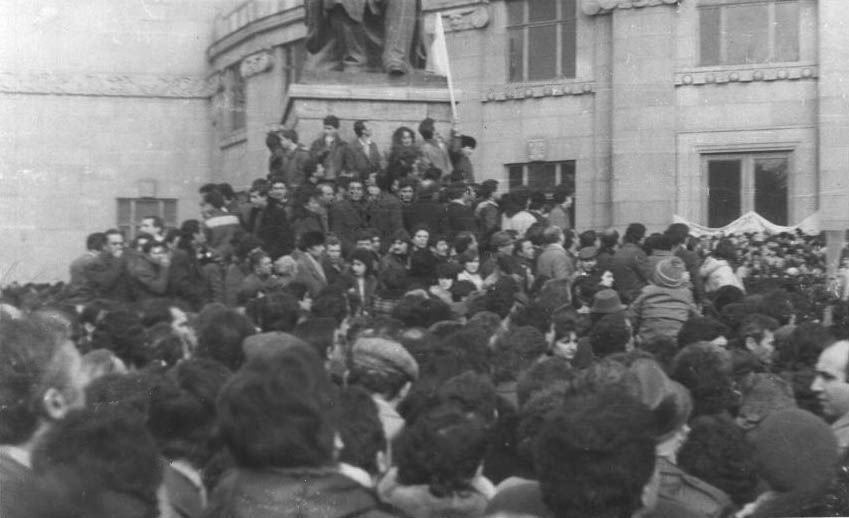
Karabakh movement, 1988

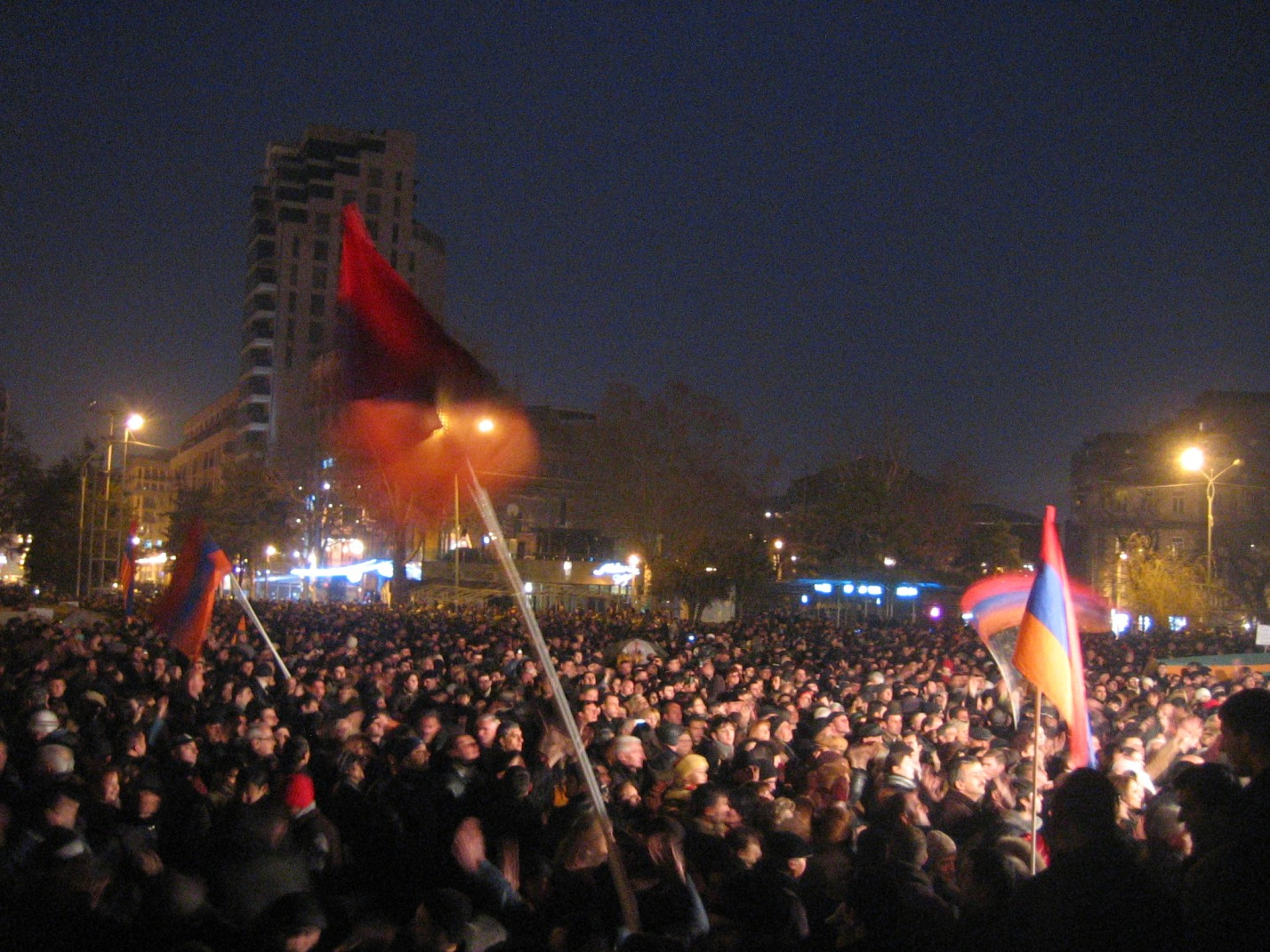
2008 Armenian presidential election protests: Thousands of protesters at Liberty Square on a typical evening (February 24)

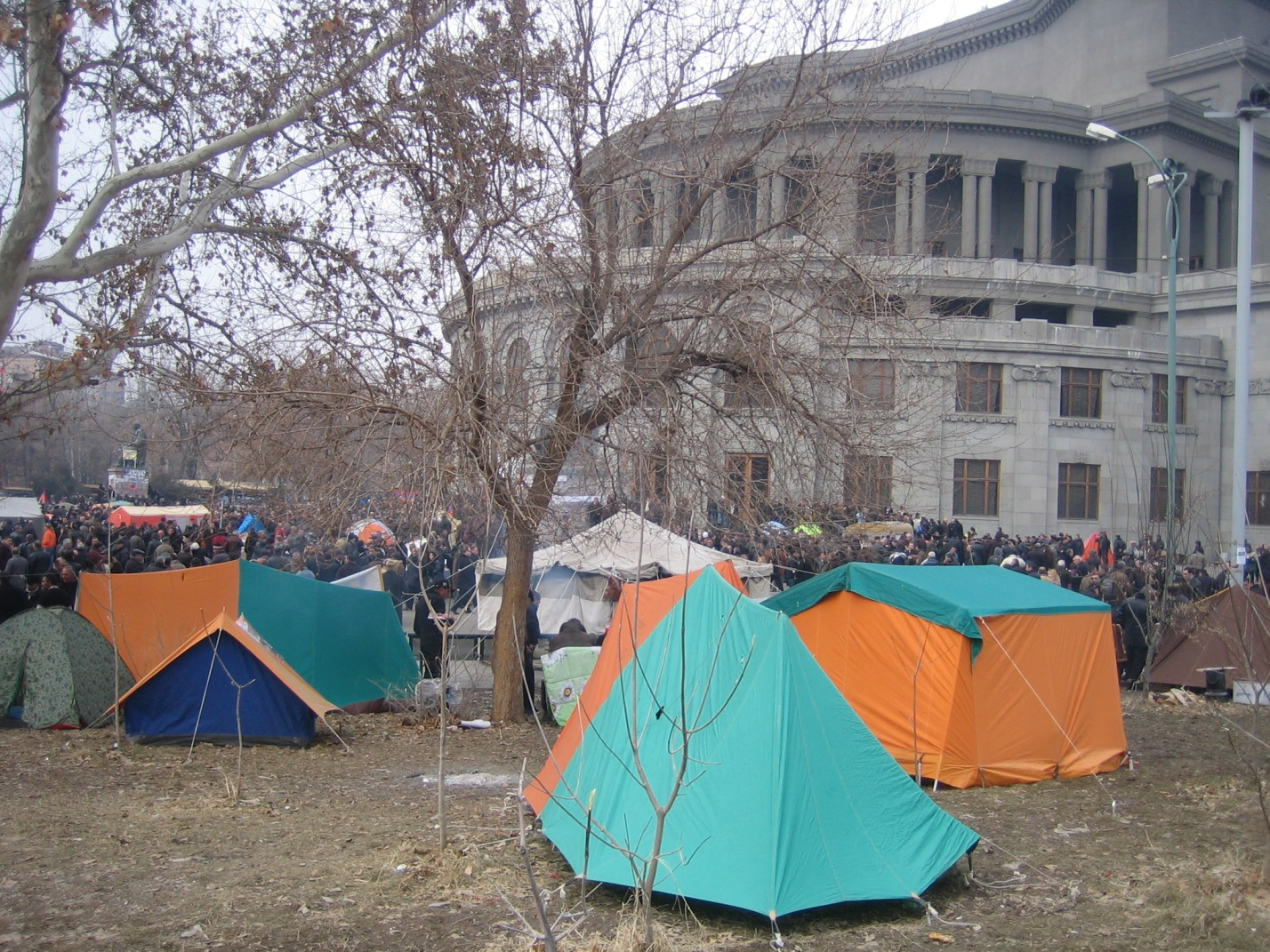
2008 protests: Tents set up

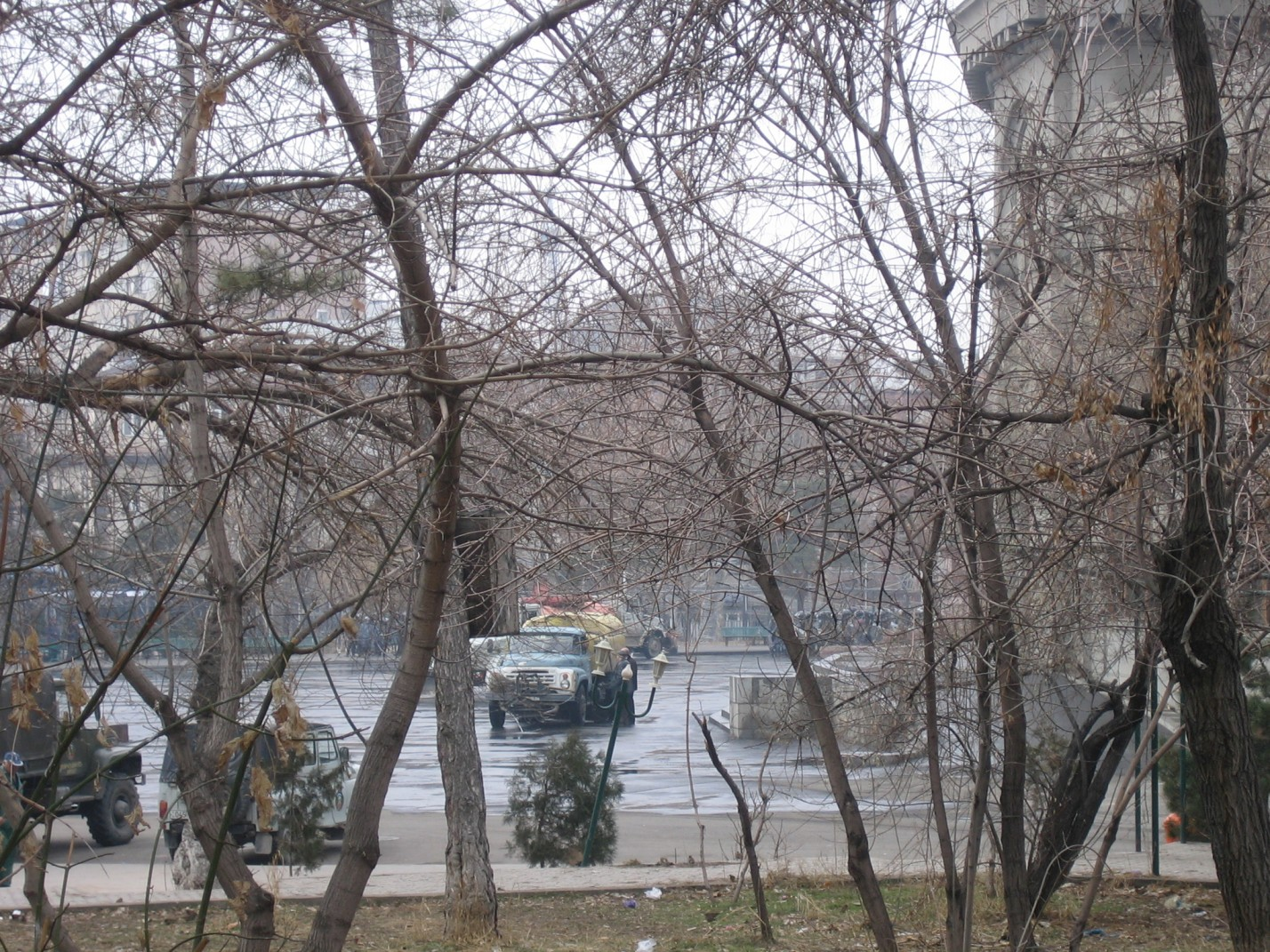
2008 protests: A water tanker cleans Opera Square of debris and blood after the government's crackdown

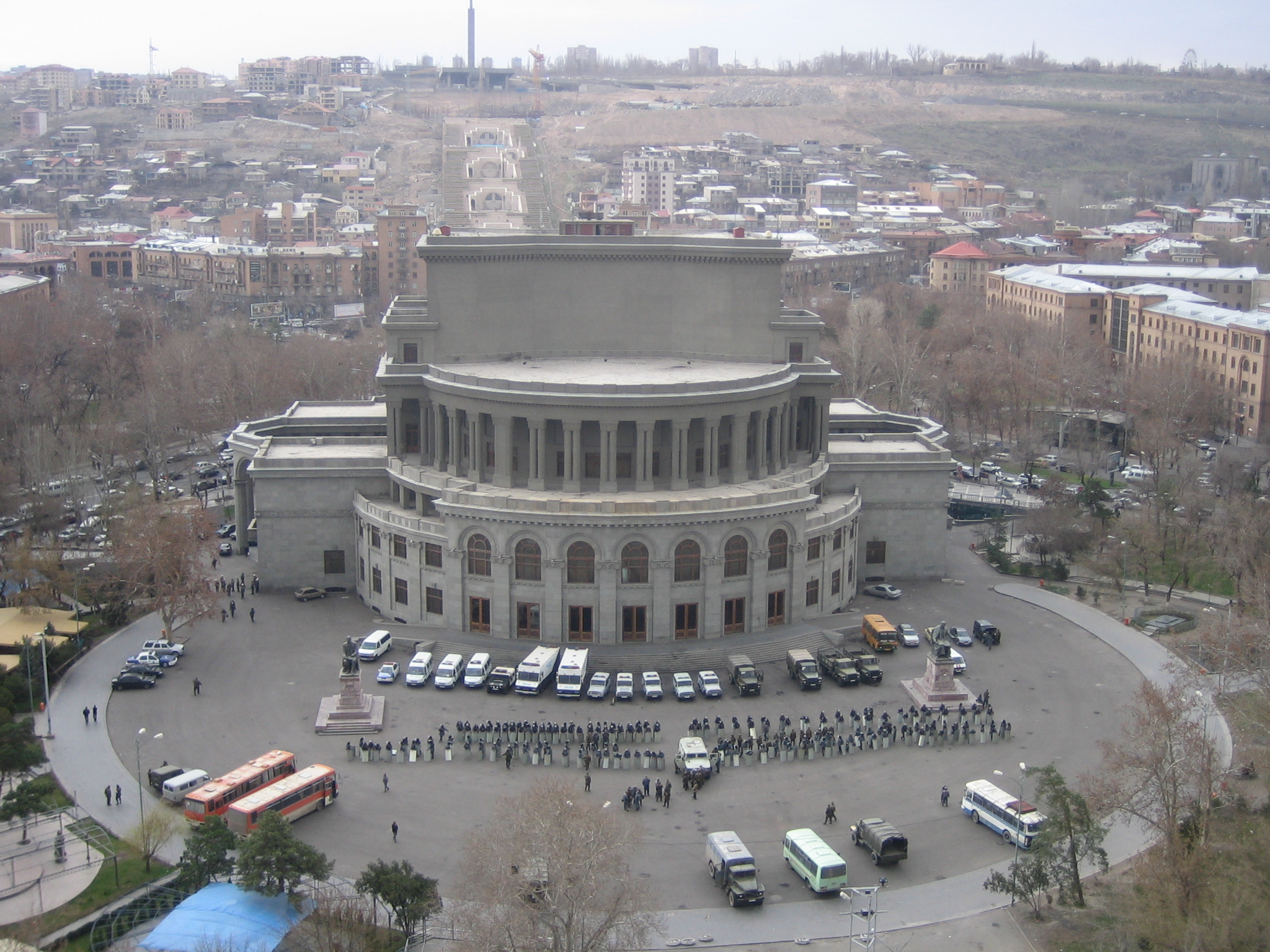
2008 protests: Riot police and army occupy and block access to Liberty Square as well as to other major squares in Yerevan, March 21

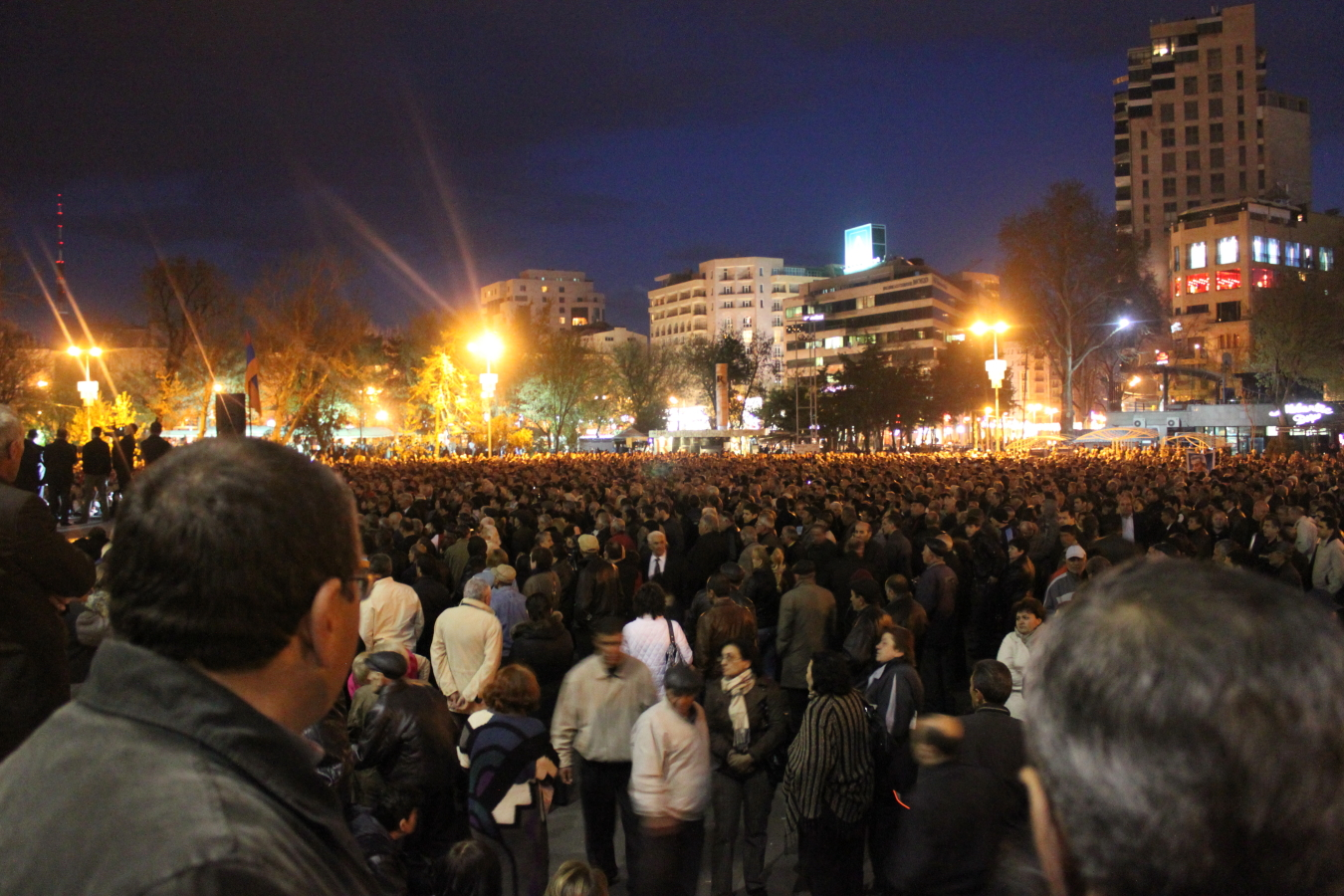
2011 Armenian protests

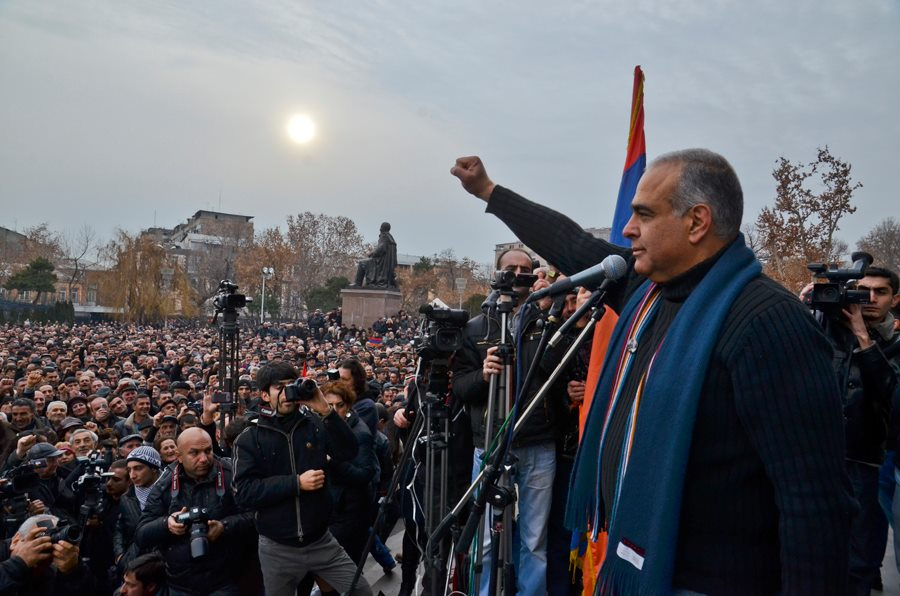
2013 Armenian protests

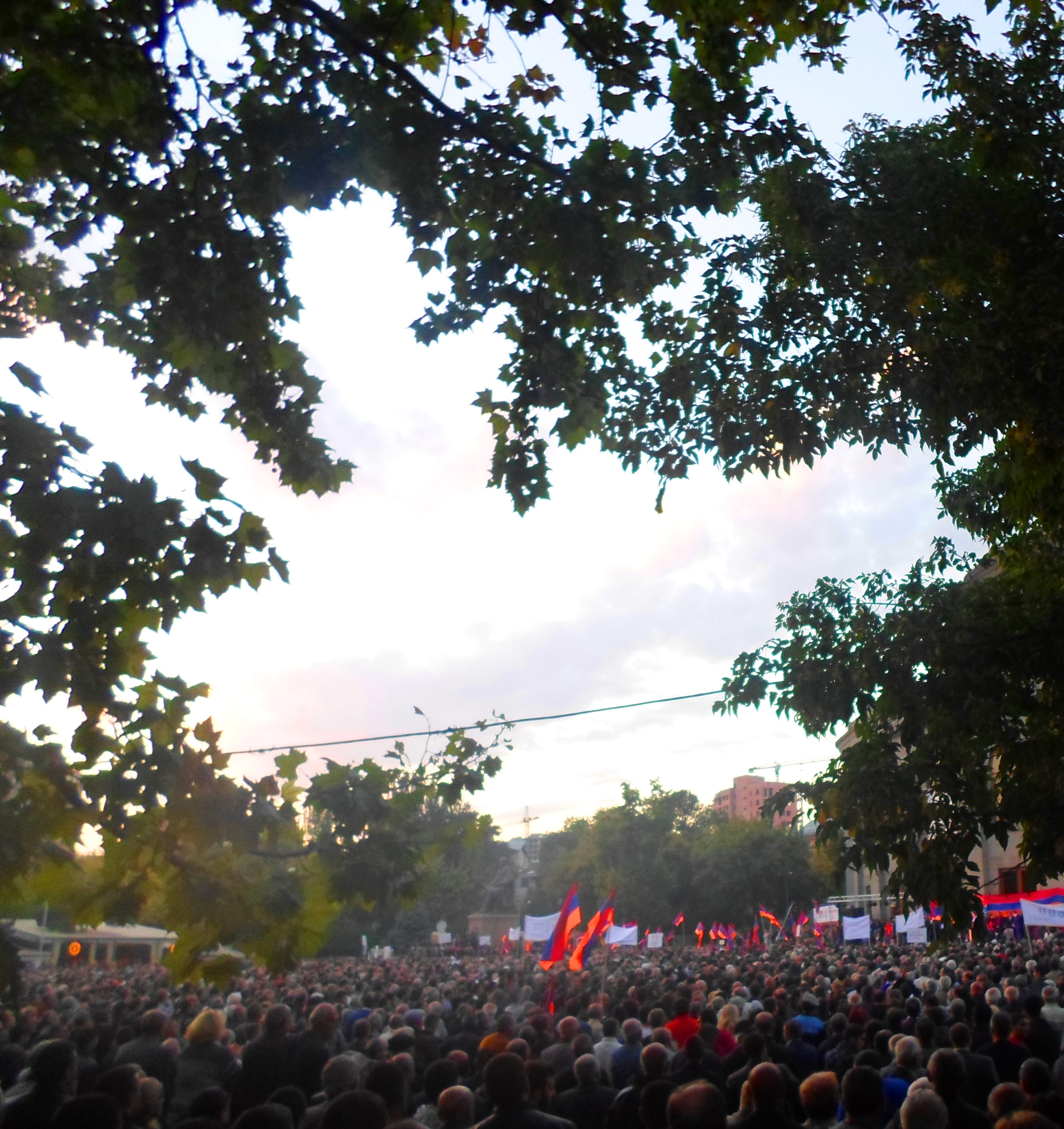
10.10.2014
