= Heritage (Armenia) =

Heritage Ժառանգություն
- Leader: Raffi Hovannisian
- Founded: 2002
- Headquarters: Yerevan
- Membership: 6,450 (2012)
- Ideology: National liberalism (self-proclaimed); Liberalism; Armenian nationalism Pro-Europeanism; Pro-Western
- Political position: Centre to centre-right
- European affiliation: European People's Party (EPP) (observer); European Democratic Party (before 2012)
- International affiliation: Centrist Democrat International (Observer)
- National Assembly: 0 / 107

Website
- heritage.am

Heritage (Armenian: Ժառանգություն, romanized: Zhaṙangut’yun) is an Armenian national liberal political party. It was founded in 2002 by Raffi Hovannisian, independent Armenia's first Foreign Minister.

== Ideology ==
- Liberal democracy is the party's principle ideology.

Economy

- The party has stated its support for Economic liberalism.
- Other domestic policy goals include legal reforms, the development of civil society and the economic development of Armenia. Heritage has stated that sustaining the competitiveness of the market will help strengthen the Armenian economy.
- The party also believes that reducing poverty and building good social services should be prioritized. By taking these measures, Heritage has the objective to reduce emigration from Armenia and stop the "brain drain" from the country.
- The party supports the establishment of a Deep and Comprehensive Free Trade Area between Armenia and the EU.

Foreign Affairs

- The party's foreign policy can be characterized as balanced, but also as pro-Western. The Heritage party underlines maintaining and developing good relations with the United States, Russia, Georgia, China and India, but sees European integration and cooperation as the key to progress. European integration is not a goal on its own, but rather a tool for improved well-being, prosperity and security. With Turkey, Heritage advocates an open and honest dialogue.
- The party not only advocates for the integration of Armenia with Europe but also the eventual accession of Armenia into the European Union. Heritage firmly believes that for centuries Armenia has been one of the constituents of European civilization, regardless of the geographical boundaries drawn for Europe. The party believes that Armenia must adhere to Pan-European values and that Armenia can contribute to the enrichment of Europe's cultural heritage.
- Some party members have advocated their support for the withdrawal of Armenia from the Collective Security Treaty Organization.
- The party supports recognition of the Republic of Artsakh as an independent state (the party has several times unsuccessfully proposed bills in parliament that would formally recognize the Republic of Artsakh by Armenia).
- Continued cooperation with both NATO and CIS member states.

== Electoral record ==
The party emerged as the fifth largest party in the National Assembly of Armenia after its debut in the 2007 Armenian parliamentary elections. It won 6% of the popular vote and obtained 7 seats.

Prior to the 2012 parliamentary election, some Free Democrats party members decided to run under the Heritage list. Following the election, Heritage won 5 seats with 86,998 votes, becoming the smallest faction within the National Assembly, with Zaruhi Postanjyan as its leader.

Heritage participated in the 2017 Armenian parliamentary election as part of the ORO Alliance, however the alliance gained just 2.07% of the popular vote, winning no seats.

The party decided not to participate in the 2018 Armenian parliamentary election or the 2021 Armenian parliamentary election. The party currently acts as an extra-parliamentary force.

=== National Assembly ===
Year	Party-list			Constituency seats	Total seats	+/–
Year	Votes	%	Seats/total	Constituency seats	Total seats	+/–
2007	81,048	6.0%	7 / 90	0 / 41	7 / 131	▲7
2012	86,998	5.8%	5 / 90	0 / 41	5 / 131	▼2
2017	32,508	2.07%	0 / 90	0 / 41	0 / 131	▼5

=== Presidential elections ===
Year	Candidate	Votes	%	Rank
2008	endorsed Levon Ter-Petrosyan			
2013	Raffi Hovannisian	539,672	36.8%	2

=== Local elections ===
The party participated in the 2013 Yerevan City Council elections as part of the Barev Yerevan alliance. Barev Yerevan consisted mostly of Heritage party members, in addition to a few members from the Democratic Way Party, the Democratic Homeland Party, and the Conservative Party. The alliance came in third place, winning 8.48% of the vote and gaining 6 seats in the Yerevan City Council.

The party participated in the 2018 Yerevan City Council elections, receiving just 0.75% of the popular vote, failing to win any seats in the Yerevan City Council.

== Activities ==
On 25 March 2021, Raffi Hovannisian met with the President of Armenia Armen Sarksyan to discuss the political situation in the country.

On 1 April 2021, Heritage signed a joint declaration with four other political parties calling on the Government of Armenia to ensure free and fair upcoming elections, following the on-going political unrest in Armenia.

On 15 April 2021, the party signed a joint statement with eight other political parties calling on the President of Armenia to ensure democracy and the Constitution of Armenia is upheld in the country during the 2020–2021 Armenian protests.

== See also ==
- Politics of Armenia
- Programs of political parties in Armenia
