= List of paintings in the National Gallery of Art formerly in the Hermitage Museum =

This is the list of the Hermitage paintings acquired by Andrew W. Mellon during the Soviet sale of Hermitage paintings in 1930–1931 and donated to the National Gallery of Art.

Image	Year	Artist	Title	Dimensions (cm × cm)	Purchase date
	c. 1434 – c. 1436	Jan van Eyck	The Annunciation	90.2 × 34.1	Jun 1930
	c. 1478 – c. 1482	Sandro Botticelli	The Adoration of the Magi	70 x 104.2	Jan 1931
	c. 1482 – c. 1485	Pietro Perugino	The Crucifixion with the Virgin, Saint John, Saint Jerome, and Saint Mary Magdalene	134 × 165.1	Apr 1931
	c. 1506	Raphael	Saint George and the Dragon	28.5 × 21.5	Mar 1931
	c. 1510	Raphael	The Alba Madonna	94.5 (diameter)	Apr 1931
	1555	Titian	Venus with a Mirror	124.5 × 105.5	Apr 1931
	c. 1581 – c. 1582	Paolo Veronese	The Finding of Moses	58 × 44.5	Nov 1930
	c. 1605	Circle of Diego Velázquez	Pope Innocent X	49.2 × 41.3	Jul 1930
	1618	Anthony van Dyck	Portrait of a Flemish Lady	123 × 90	between Jun 1930 and Apr 1931
	1621	Anthony van Dyck	Isabella Brant	153 × 120	Aug 1930
	1621	Anthony van Dyck	Susanna Fourment and Her Daughter	172 × 117	Mar 1930
	1632	Anthony van Dyck	Philip, Lord Wharton	133 × 106	Mar 1930
	1636/1638	Frans Hals	Portrait of a Member of the Haarlem Civic Guard	86 × 69	Mar 1931
	1637	Rembrandt	A Polish Nobleman	96.8 × 66	Feb 1931
	1646/1648	Frans Hals	Portrait of a Young Man	68 × 55.4	Feb 1931
	1646/1648, completed 1651	Workshop of Rembrandt (possibly Carel Fabritius)	A Girl with a Broom	107.3 × 91.4	Feb 1931
	c. 1653	Adriaen Hanneman	Henry, Duke of Gloucester	104.8 × 87	Nov 1930
	1655	Workshop of Rembrandt	Joseph Accused by Potiphar's Wife	105.7 × 97.8	Jan 1931
	1655	Rembrandt and Workshop (probably Govert Flinck)	Man in Oriental Costume	98.5 × 74.5	between Jun 1930 and Apr 1931
	1656	Rembrandt	A Woman Holding a Pink	103 × 86	Mar 1931
	c. 1737	Jean-Baptiste-Siméon Chardin	The House of Cards	82.2 × 66	Mar 1931

== Bibliography ==
- Selling Russia's Treasures by Nicholas Iljine, Natalia Semenova and Amir G. Kabiri (project directors). MTA Publishing (The M. T. Abraham Foundation), Paris–Moscow, 2013.
- Prodannye Sokrovishcha Rossii (lit. The Sold Treasures of Russia) by Nicholas Iljine and Natalia Semenova (project directors). Russkiy Avantgard publishers, Moscow, 2000.
