= Boris Legran =

Russian revolutionary and Soviet official (1884-1936)

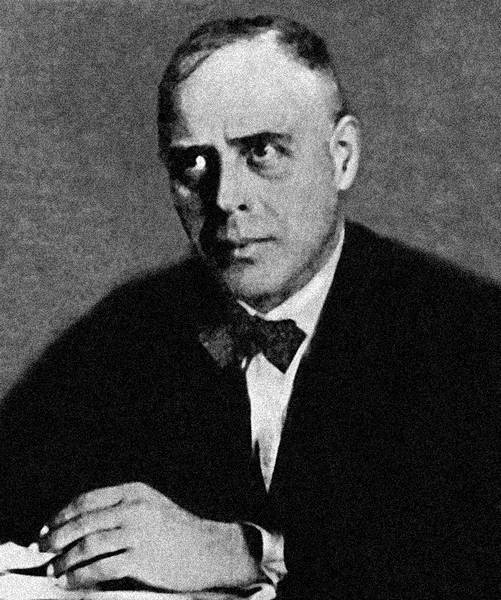
Boris Legran

Boris Vasilyevich Legran or Legrand (Russian: Борис Васильевич Легран; 1884 – 1936) was a Russian revolutionary and Soviet official who represented the interests of the Russian SFSR in Armenia and Transcaucasia, during the 1920s and worked as a consular official in China during the 1920s.

He also was the director of the State Hermitage Museum in Leningrad in 1931–1934.

== Biography ==
Legran was born into the family of a civil servant in 1884 and joined the Russian Social Democratic Labour Party in 1901. He took part in the October Revolution in Petrograd as a Bolshevik after service in the Russian Imperial Army in World War I and, in the ensuing civil war, was appointed Deputy People's Commissar of Naval Affairs in 1918. He represented the interests of the Russian SFSR in Armenia and Transcaucasia, beginning in 1920. Legran officially joined the Communist Party in 1919.

Legrand was appointed head of the Soviet consulate in Harbin in 1926, but was recalled the following year, after being reprimanded for his performance at the consulate by the Central Committee.

In 1931 Legran was appointed director of the State Hermitage Museum in Leningrad, and was replaced by Joseph Orbeli in 1934.

Legran died in Leningrad in 1936 at fifty-two.

== State Hermitage Museum ==
The Alba Madonna by Raphael

The Annunciation, c. 1434, now National Gallery of Art, Washington, DC, 93 x 37 cm

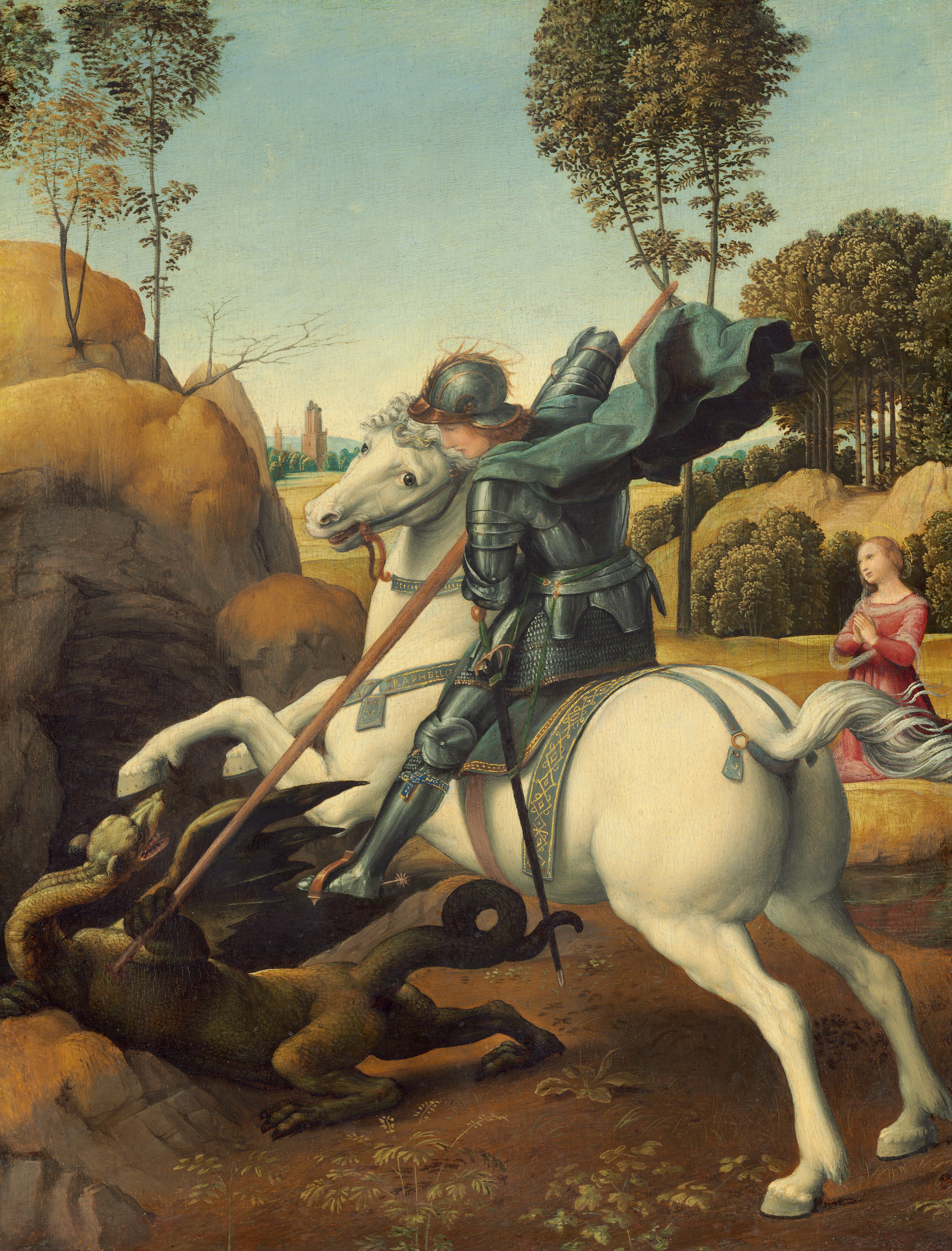
Saint George and the Dragon, by Raphael, was purchased for the Hermitage by Catherine the Great in 1772, and later hung in the gallery of portraits of the generals who had defeated Napoleon. It was sold to Andrew Mellon in 1931.

In 1931 Legran was appointed to run the State Hermitage Museum in Leningrad. During his time at the helm, Legran was busy with the "Socialist Reconstruction" of the museum. In other words, he oversaw that the works on display were being presented "in keeping with the new principles of the country's life and new policies". This transformation was launched in 1932, during the 2nd "Five Year Plan" of the USSR. Legran supported the creation of an "exhibition imbued with ideology", that modern observers consider to have been vulgar. His goal was to turn objets d'art (for instance, the Fabergé jewelry) into a kind of "evidence to the oppression of peoples under the Tsarist regime".

Legran's three years in office are remembered for the scandalous sale of the highlights of the museum's collection to the West, primarily to Andrew W. Mellon. With his connivance, clandestine auctions were held abroad, so as to raise additional money for the ongoing industrialization of the Soviet Union. Legran believed that antique furniture, magnificent jewelry, and paintings on religious subjects were of little interest to the Soviet people. Accordingly, about 2,880 "ecclesiastic" paintings were sent from the Hermitage to be auctioned. Of these, 250 were seen as being major works, and 50 are now recognised as priceless masterpieces (e.g., Raphael's Madonna Alba and Jan van Eyck's Annunciation).

During his time, some innovations were adopted. For instance, he introduced the so-called music exhibitions, a product of his work with S. Ginzburg. Also, in 1934, he provided for the development and transfer to the Hermitage museum of methodologies for restoring especially complicated metal objects. This was done through an agreement signed with the "State Academy of the History of Material Culture". A dedicated laboratory was provided and fully equipped for this purpose - the forerunner of today's restoration laboratory for works of applied art.

As director of the Hermitage, Legrand unyieldingly followed the principles of revolutionary art, striving to present luxurious works of art from bygone eras as evidence of the exploitation of the people by the tsarist regime. For the sake of the "political reconstruction" of the museum, the publishing activity was also rebuilt. On the basis of the so-called Marxist-Leninist methodology, Legrand published in 1934 the book The Socialist Reconstruction of the Hermitage.
