= Boris Arnoldovich Vaks =

Soviet playwright, translator, journalist and theater critic (1889–missing 1941)

- Борис Арнольдович Вакс
- Boris Vaks (left) with his brother Mikhail on the Turkestan Front, 1920
- Born: April 15, 1889; Berdychiv, Kiev Governorate, Russian Empire
- Disappeared: October 1941; Soviet Union
- Occupations: Playwright, translator, theater critic, journalist, political official
- Years active: 1920–1941
- Spouse: Esfir Samuilovna Milkina
- Children: Arnold Borisovich Vaks

Boris Arnoldovich Vaks (Russian: Борис Арнольдович Вакс; born 15 April 1889; missing since October 1941) was a Russian and Soviet playwright, theater critic, translator, journalist and political official. He served in political positions during the Russian Civil War, participated in the Soviet delegation to the Genoa Conference of 1922, and subsequently worked in Soviet journalism and theater. He disappeared during the Battle of Moscow in October 1941.

== Biography ==
=== Early life and education ===
Vaks was born on 15 April 1889 in Berdychiv, Kiev Governorate, in the Russian Empire, into a Jewish family. His father was Aron-Aizik Gersh-Gdalevich Vaks. A surviving personnel questionnaire from the People's Commissariat for Nationalities gives his birth year as 1899, conflicting with the 1889 date recorded in other biographical sources.

Before the October Revolution, Vaks left Russia for political reasons and studied at universities in Italy and Switzerland. Following the Bolshevik Revolution, he returned to Russia.

=== Revolutionary and political career ===
During the Russian Civil War, Vaks held political and administrative positions on the Turkestan Front. He served as military commissar of the operations directorate of the front headquarters, chief of the political department of the Directorate for the Formation and Training of Troops, and head of the front's political department.

After the Civil War, he worked in the People's Commissariat for Foreign Affairs. He participated in the delegation of the Russian Soviet Federative Socialist Republic to the Genoa Conference in 1922.

Beginning on 14 July 1920, Vaks worked in the Instructor-Organizational Department of the People's Commissariat for Nationalities. In 1922, he served as acting head of that department. On 14 December 1922, he became a research associate of Fedkompros, an organization within the commissariat.

=== Journalism and literary career ===
In the late 1920s, Vaks worked for the executive committee of International Red Aid, its associated publishing organization, and the journal Novy Zritel (New Spectator).

He subsequently held positions in the press department of the Central Committee of the All-Union Communist Party (Bolsheviks), served as deputy editor-in-chief of the newspaper Kino (Cinema), and headed the foreign affairs department of Vechernyaya Moskva (Evening Moscow).

Vaks also served as executive secretary of the popular science magazine Nauka i Zhizn (Science and Life) and executive secretary of the Union of Revolutionary Playwrights. During this period, he lived at 23 Bolshoy Kozikhinsky Lane, apartment 25, in Moscow.

In literary circles, Vaks was principally known as a playwright. His works included The Paris Commune and While They Fought, the latter staged at a branch of the Maly Theatre in 1927.

During the late 1930s, Vaks lived in Lavrushinsky Lane in Moscow, sharing an apartment with members of the family of literary critic Viktor Shklovsky and scholar Nikolai Khardzhiev.

The poet Osip Mandelstam, who stayed with the Shklovsky family during visits to Moscow, referred humorously to Vaks's preoccupation with repairs to his room. The reference was preserved by Nadezhda Mandelstam in her writings.

=== Second World War and disappearance ===
Following the German invasion of the Soviet Union in June 1941, Vaks joined the Moscow people's militia. He was assigned to the first battalion of the 22nd Rifle Regiment of the 8th Krasnopresnenskaya People's Militia Division, which included two companies composed of writers and literary workers.

Vaks was appointed political instructor of one of the companies and held the military administrative rank of second-rank quartermaster.

During the Battle of Moscow, his unit was encircled by German forces, and he was reported missing in October 1941.

The Russian-language biographical account also reports that Soviet military authorities subsequently issued a secret order accusing Vaks of defecting to German forces. According to the allegations recorded by Soviet authorities, he was living in the Smolensk area, working as a translator and wearing a German military uniform. The allegations have not been independently established in the sources consulted for this translation, and his subsequent fate remains unknown.

== Family ==
Vaks was married to Esfir Samuilovna (Samoylovna) Milkina. Their son, Arnold Borisovich Vaks, lived from 1940 to 1997.

His siblings included:

- Klara Arnoldovna Khrennikova (1908–2001), who married literary critic Anatoly Tarasenkov and subsequently composer Tikhon Khrennikov.
- Maria Arnoldovna Arnazi (born 1898), née Vaks and later Barshak, a silent-film actress.
- Mikhail Arnoldovich Insarov-Vaks (1900–1979), a cinematographer, screenwriter and photojournalist for the newspapers Trud and Uralsky Rabochy. He received the Order of the Red Banner in 1921.
- Lev Arnoldovich Vaks, head of the Main Editorial Department of the Central Documentary Film Studio.

The family relationships are also discussed in Russian biographical materials concerning Tikhon Khrennikov and the Vaks family.

== Works ==
=== Plays ===
- 72 Days: An Episode from the Time of the Paris Commune (72 дня: Эпизод из времени Парижской коммуны). A play in three acts and four scenes. Moscow: MODP and K, 1925. Second edition: Publishing House of the Central Committee of International Red Aid of the USSR, 1930.
- While They Fought (Пока они сражались). A play in five acts based on a novel by Cyril-Berger, written with E. Matern. Moscow: Tea-Kino-Pechat, 1928, 80 pages. Revised second edition by Boris Vaks: Moscow, Iskusstvo, 1940, 160 pages.
- Seventy-Two Days (Семьдесят два дня). A play in three acts. Moscow–Leningrad: State Publishing House, 1928.
- Wolf Pits (Волчьи ямы). A play in three acts and five scenes. Moscow–Leningrad: State Publishing House, 1928.
- Moscow Has Nothing to Do with It! (Москва тут не при чём!). Moscow: Tea-Kino-Pechat, 1930.
- The Heir of Raffke and Co. (Наследник Раффке и К°). A satirical comedy in five acts, based on a novel by A. Landeberger, written with E. Matern. Moscow: Tea-Kino-Pechat, 1930.
- The Profiteers (Рвачи). A drama in four acts. Moscow–Leningrad: OGIZ, State Publishing House of Fiction, Arts Section, 1931.
- The Wharf (Причал). A play in four acts. Moscow–Leningrad: OGIZ, State Publishing House of Fiction, Arts Section, 1931.
- The Spoiled Performance, or the Senior Footman of the King of England (Испорченное представление или старший лакей короля аглицкого). A theatrical and cinematic spectacle in 38 scenes. Moscow: State Publishing House, 1925.

=== Publications ===
- From October to Genoa: International Relations of the RSFSR (От Октября до Генуи: Международные отношения РСФСР). A reference handbook compiled by Boris Vaks. Moscow: Publishing House of the People's Commissariat for Foreign Affairs, 1922, 130 pages.

=== Translations ===
- Henri Torres, Extra Edition (Экстренный выпуск). A play in five acts based on L. Weitzenkorn. Translated from French by Boris Vaks and E. Matern; adapted by Boris Vaks. Moscow: TsEDRAM, 1936, 68 pages.
- Ernst Toller, A Murder Case (Дело об убийстве). A drama in four acts, translated from German and adapted from The Blind Goddess by Boris Vaks. Moscow: TsEDRAM, 1934.
- Eugen Paul, Comrade Minister (Товарищ министр). A political satire in four acts, translated and adapted from German by Boris Vaks. Moscow–Leningrad: State Publishing House of Fiction, 1931, 60 pages.
- M. N. Daniel, Four Days (Yulis) (Четыре дня (Юлис)). A heroic drama in three acts, translated from Yiddish by Boris Vaks. Moscow: Iskusstvo, 1940, 98 pages.
