= Soviet sale of Hermitage paintings =

Art sale in 1930 and 1931

The Alba Madonna by Raphael, was bought for the Hermitage by Emperor Nicholas I of Russia in 1836. It was sold to Andrew Mellon by the Soviet Government in 1931 for $1,166,400, the largest sum ever paid for a painting until that time.

The Soviet sale of Hermitage paintings between 1928 and 1931 resulted in the departure of some of the most valuable paintings from the collection of the State Hermitage Museum in Leningrad to Western museums. Several of the paintings had been in the Hermitage Collection since its creation by Empress Catherine the Great. About 250 paintings were sold, including masterpieces by Jan van Eyck, Titian, Rembrandt, Rubens, Raphael, and other important artists. Andrew Mellon donated the twenty-one paintings he purchased from the Hermitage to the United States government in 1937, which became the nucleus of the National Gallery of Art in Washington, D.C.

== History ==
The Annunciation by Jan van Eyck (1434) was purchased for the Hermitage by Emperor Nicholas I of Russia in 1850. It was sold to Andrew Mellon in June 1930 for $502,899.

In the late 1920s, the Soviet government urgently needed foreign currency to finance the rapid industrialization of Russia ordered in the first Five Year Plan. The government had already sold off collections of jewelry, furniture and icons seized from the Russian nobility, wealthy classes, and the church.

In February 1928, the State Hermitage Museum in Leningrad, along with the Russian Museum, was ordered to make a list of art works worth at least two million rubles, for export. A special agency called 'Antiquariat' was created under the Narkompros (the People's Commisariat of Enlightenment) and opened an office in Leningrad to oversee the sale. The Hermitage was instructed to sell 250 paintings for at least 5000 rubles each, plus engravings and a number of golden treasures from ancient Scythia.

In 1928 an initial auction was organised at Rudolph Lepke's Auction House in Germany consisting of 447 lots of paintings, sculpture and furniture. A second auction was prepared in 1929 featuring more prominent paintings, but failed to attract sufficient interest to meet reserves on many items.

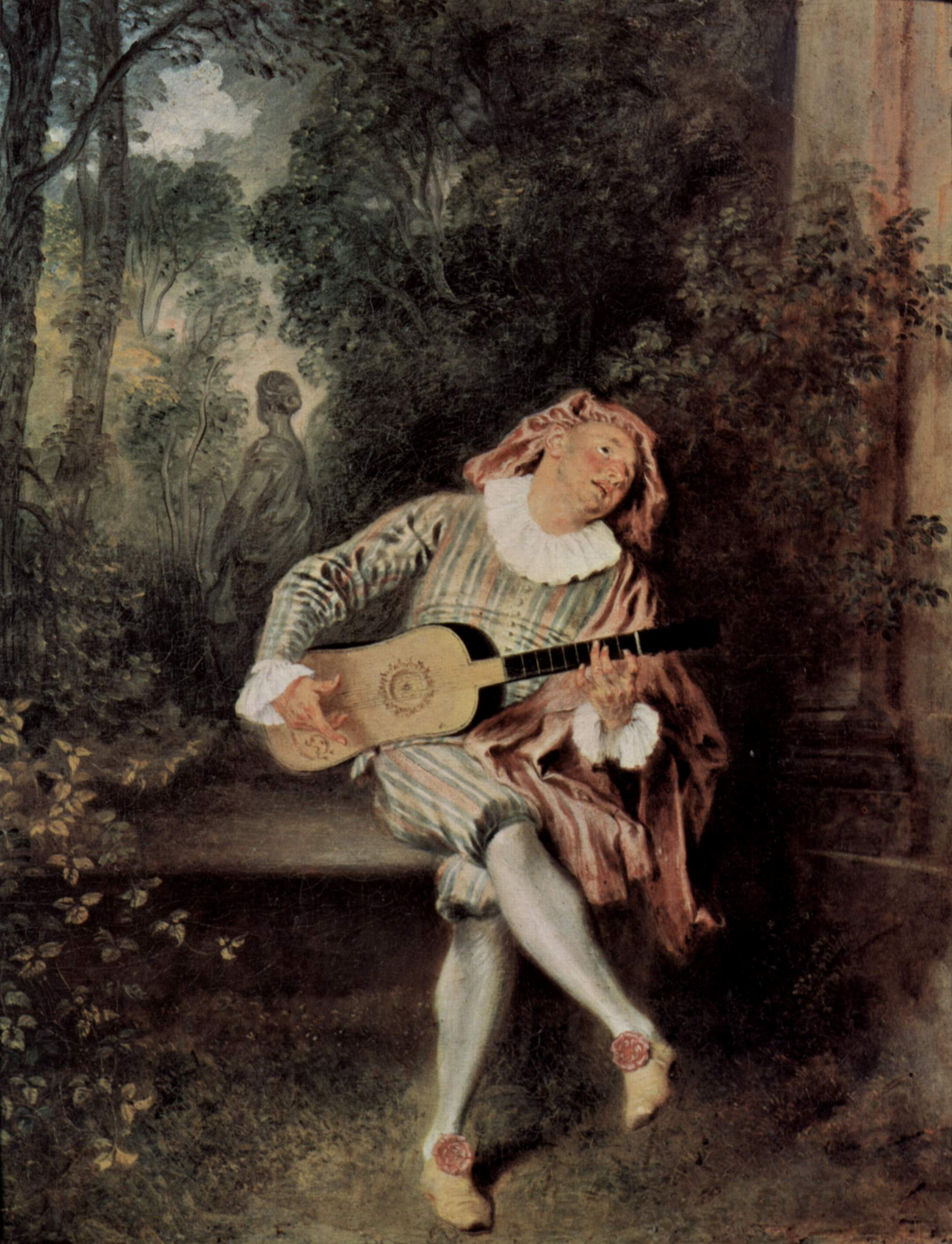
Mezzettino by Antoine Watteau, was purchased for the Hermitage by Catherine the Great in 1767. It was sold in May 1930 to Calouste Gulbenkian, who sold it in 1934 to the Metropolitan Museum in New York.

Subsequent sales were secret, but word was quietly spread to selected western art dealers and collectors that the paintings were on the market.

The first foreign buyer to purchase Hermitage paintings was Calouste Gulbenkian, the founder of the Iraq Petroleum Company, who began buying paintings in early 1930, trading them for oil with the Russians. These works later formed part of the Calouste Gulbenkian Museum, in Lisbon. However, the organizers of the sale were dissatisfied with the amounts they received from Gulbenkian, so they looked for other buyers.

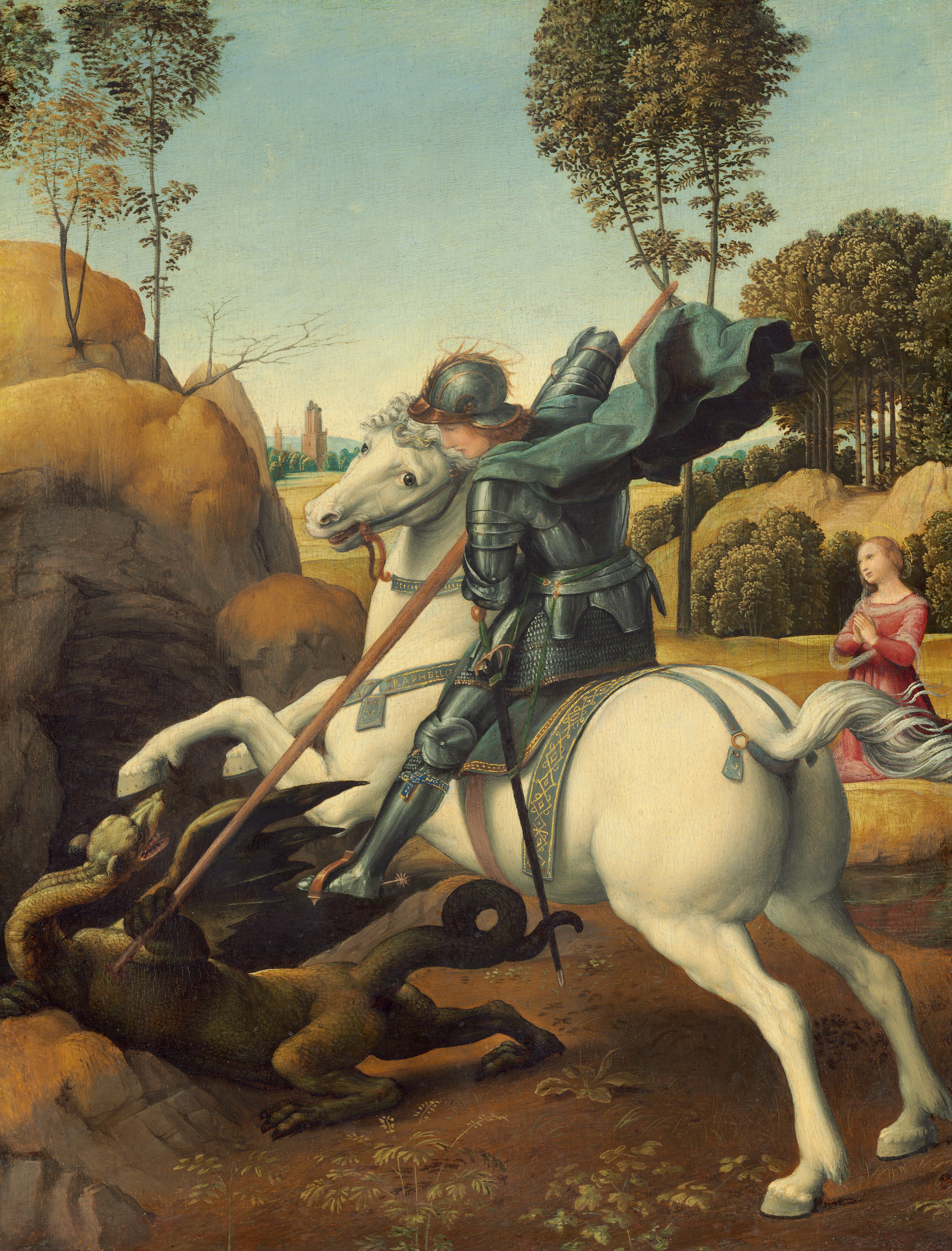
Saint George and the Dragon, by Raphael, was purchased for the Hermitage by Catherine the Great in 1772, and later hung in the gallery of portraits of the generals who had defeated Napoleon. It was sold to Andrew Mellon in 1931.

Andrew Mellon was an American banker, Secretary of the Treasury under Presidents Warren G. Harding, Calvin Coolidge, and Herbert Hoover, art collector, and, at the time, American Ambassador to Great Britain. He conceived the idea of founding an art museum for the United States modeled after the National Gallery, London. He heard about the secret Hermitage sale from Knoedler and Company of New York, dealers which he regularly used for his art purchases.

Franz Zatzenstein-Matthiesen, a young German art dealer, had been asked by the Soviet Government to compile a list of the hundred paintings in Russian collections, which should never be sold under any circumstances. He was surprised soon afterwards to find several of the paintings on his list were in Paris, purchased by Gulbenkian. Gulbenkian asked him to act as his agent on further purchases, but Matthiesen instead formed a consortium with Colnaghi's of London and with the firm patronized most by Mellon, Knoedler's. In 1930 and 1931 the consortium bought twenty-one paintings from the Soviet government, which they offered to Mellon, who had the right of first refusal. By the end of 1931, Mellon had acquired twenty-one paintings for a total price of $6,654,000. They included van Eyck's Annunciation and Raphael's Alba Madonna. The latter painting was sold for $1,166,400, the largest sum ever paid for a single painting until that time. The consortium sold several other paintings to other clients, including the Metropolitan Museum of Art in New York.

The sale remained secret until November 4, 1933, when it was reported in The New York Times that several Hermitage paintings, including the Crucifixion and Last Judgement diptych by van Eyck, had been purchased by the Metropolitan Museum.

The sales came to an end in 1934, possibly as a result of a letter to Stalin from the deputy director of the Hermitage, Joseph Orbeli, protesting the sale of Russia's treasures. The director of the Hermitage, Boris Legran, who had been brought to the museum to conduct the sale, was dismissed in 1934 and replaced by Orbeli.

In 1937, Andrew Mellon donated the twenty-one paintings, along with the money to build a National Gallery of Art to house them, to the United States Government. The paintings were, and would remain, the kernel of the National Gallery of Art collection.

Other sales were made in the same period, notably the Codex Siniaticus from the Russian National Library, sold in 1933 to the British Museum (after 1973 British Library) for £100,000 raised by public subscription (worth £6.2 million in 2025), and The Night Café by Vincent van Gogh.

In the 1990s, following the collapse of the Soviet Union, the State Duma of the Russian Federation passed a new law prohibiting the sale of Russian art treasures to foreign countries.

For many years the National Gallery of Art was reluctant to lend the paintings it had bought from the Hermitage back to that Museum, for fear that the Russian government would keep the paintings in Russia. That policy changed after 1990, when Mikhail Piotrovsky became director of the Hermitage. A number of the National Gallery paintings have been loaned to the Hermitage, including Venus with a Mirror by Titian, at the time of the first visit of the President George W. Bush to St Petersburg in 2002.

== Timeline ==
February 1928

Hermitage ordered to prepare list of paintings for sale.

April 1929

- Circle of Dierick Bouts, Annunciation (sold to Calouste Gulbenkian, now Calouste Gulbenkian Museum, Lisbon, Portugal)
- Hubert Robert, Le Tapis Vert (sold to Calouste Gulbenkian, now Calouste Gulbenkian Museum, Lisbon, Portugal)
- Hubert Robert, Le Bosquet des Bains d’Apollon (sold to Calouste Gulbenkian, now Calouste Gulbenkian Museum, Lisbon, Portugal)

January 1930

- Antoine Watteau, The Lute Player (sold to Calouste Gulbenkian)
- Rembrandt van Rijn, Portrait of Titus (sold to Calouste Gulbenkian)
- Anthony van Dyck, Susanna Fourment and her Daughter (sold to Mellon syndicate)
- Anthony van Dyck, Portrait of Philip, Lord Wharton (sold to Mellon syndicate)

March 1930

- Peter Paul Rubens, Portrait of Helena Fourment (sold to Calouste Gulbenkian, now Calouste Gulbenkian Museum, Lisbon, Portugal)

May 1930

- Nicolas Lancret, The Beautiful Bathers (sold to Calouste Gulbenkian, then resold to Georges Wildenstein. Now in a private collection.)
- Antoine Watteau, Mezzetino sold to Gulbenkian then resold to the Metropolitan Museum of Art in 1934.

June 1930

- Jan van Eyck, The Annunciation (sold to Mellon syndicate for $502,899.)
- Rembrandt van Rijn, Pallas Athenas, (sold to Calouste Gulbenkian, now Calouste Gulbenkian Museum, Lisbon, Portugal)

July 1930

- Anthony van Dyck, Portrait of Isabella Brandt (sold to Mellon syndicate for $223,000.)

October 1930

- Rembrandt van Rijn, Portrait of an Old Man (sold to Gulbenkian for 30,000 pounds sterling, now Calouste Gulbenkian Museum, Lisbon, Portugal)

November 1930

- Adriaen Hanneman, Portrait of Henry, Duke of Gloucester (sold to Mellon syndicate)
- Paolo Veronese, The Finding of Moses (sold to Mellon syndicate)

January, 1931

- Rembrandt van Rijn, Joseph Accused by the Wife of Potiphar (sold to Mellon syndicate)

February 1931

- Frans Hals, Portrait of a Young Man (Mellon syndicate)
- Rembrandt van Rijn, Woman with a Pink (Mellon syndicate)
- Rembrandt van Rijn, Portrait of a Polish Nobleman (Mellon syndicate)
- Raphael, Saint George and the Dragon (Mellon syndicate)
- Diego Velázquez ,Portrait of Innocent X (Mellon syndicate; the New York version)
- Sandro Botticelli, The Adoration of the Magi (Mellon syndicate)
- Frans Hals, Portrait of an Officer (Mellon syndicate)
- Rembrandt van Rijn, Women with a Rose (Mellon syndicate)
- Jean-Baptiste-Siméon Chardin, The House of Cards (Mellon syndicate)

April 1931

- Rembrandt van Rijn, A Turk. (Mellon syndicate)
- Anthony van Dyck, Portrait of a Flemish Lady (Mellon syndicate)
- Pietro Perugino, Galitzin Triptych (Mellon syndicate)
- Raphael, Alba Madonna (sold to the Mellon syndicate for $1,166,400)
- Titian, Venus with a Mirror (Mellon syndicate)

February 1932

- Giovanni Battista Tiepolo, The Banquet of Cleopatra (sold to Knoedler and Colnaghi Galleries, now in National Gallery of Victoria in Melbourne, Australia)

July 1932

- Nicolas Poussin, Triumph of Neptune and Amphitrite

1933

- Rembrandt van Rijn, The Denial of Saint Peter, sold via P & D Colnaghi to the Rijksmuseum
- Jan van Eyck, Crucifixion and Last Judgement diptych, bought by the Metropolitan Museum of Art in November 1933

== See also ==
- List of paintings in the National Gallery of Art formerly in the Hermitage Museum

== Bibliography ==
- Selling Russia's Treasures by Nicholas Iljine, Natalia Semenova and Amir G. Kabiri (project directors). MTA Publishing (The M.T. Abraham Foundation), Paris-Moscow, 2013.
- Prodannye Sokrovishcha Rossii (lit. The Sold Treasures of Russia) by Nicholas Iljine and Natalia Semenova (project directors). Russkiy Avantgard publishers, Moscow, 2000.
- Kopper, Philip. America's National Gallery of Art : A Gift to the Nation. Harry Abrams, New York, 1991.
- Serapina, N. Ermitazh kotory my poteryali (lit. The Hermitage which we lost.) Neva, Number 3, 1999.
- Walker, John, The National Gallery, Washington. Thames & Hudson, London, 1964.
