= Nikolai Khardzhiev =

Nikolai Ivanovich Khardzhiev (ru: Харджиев, Николай Иванович, 26 June 1903, Russian Empire— 10 June 1996, Amsterdam, Netherlands) was a Ukrainian writer, literary and art collector. He possessed an extensive archive and collection of Russian Avantgarde art and literature.

== Early life ==
Nikolai Khardzhiev was born in 1903 in Kakhovka, in present-day Ukraine, into a white-collar family; the surname, and Khardzhiev's features, bespeak Caucasian origins, but he was seemingly loath to discuss his own biography, of which few details are available. After graduating from school in Kakhovka in 1920, he briefly worked for his local section of the Commissariat of Enlightenment before studying law in Odesa from 1922 to 1925. Literature, however, was his true vocation, and it was on this subject that he lectured in Odesa workers' clubs and the city's State Institute of Cinema. Living in the garrulous, cosmopolitan city of Babel's tales, Khardzhiev befriended the poet Eduard Bagritsky, who was instrumental in his move to Moscow in the autumn of 1928. Bagritskii was linked to the Constructivist artists, writers and critics of Novyi lef, and it was through him that Khardzhiev met Osip Brik, Viktor Shklovsky and Boris Eikhenbaum. Shklovsky — for whom Khardzhiev briefly worked as an assistant — and Brik were the two sponsors of Khardzhiev's application to join the Union of Writers in 1940. Anna Akhmatova, the most famous Russian poet of the Soviet period, was a close friend during the war. In 1953 he married for the second time, to a sculptor, Lidia Chaga.

== Suprematist movement ==
When Kazimir Malevich returned from Europe to Stalinist Russia, his works were confiscated, and he was arrested and banned from making art in 1930. Khardzhiev preserved a large number of documents and memoirs associated with the avant-garde movement, and around 1,350 artworks. These included oil paintings, gouaches and drawings by Malevich; paintings by Pavel Filonov, Mikhail Larionov, Natalia Goncharova and Olga Rozanova; and important drawings by El Lissitzky.

== Smuggling of Nikolai Khardzhiev archive ==
Nikolai Khardzhiev possessed a major archive of documents, drawings and paintings by Russian Futurist artists. Its market value was estimated at £100M. In 1992 the Khardzhievs were invited by Professor Willem G. Weststeijn of the Slavic Institute of the University of Amsterdam to visit the university. Nikolai Khardzhiev responded by offering his archive of documents to Weststeijn's institute, and his collection of artworks to the Stedelijk Museum Amsterdam in exchange for Weststeijn's aid in moving the Khardzhievs and their possessions to the West. The archive was inspected by art historians from the Stedelijk to authenticate the paintings; they engaged the Galerie Gmurzynska of Cologne to move the archive out of Russia. The owners of the gallery, Krystyna Gmurzynska and her business partner Mathias Rastorfer, accompanied Weststeijn in 1993 to meet the Khardzhievs.

The Khardzhievs arrived in Amsterdam in November 1993. According to Lidia Khardzhiev, from May 1993 Weststeijn made frequent visits to the couple to assist in packing the archive. Manuscripts, drawings, books and watercolours were stored in 280 catalogued files. These were removed from the Khardzhievs' apartment, along with their personal belongings. Lidia Khardzhiev maintained that the paintings and books were sent to the Galerie Gmurzynska while the archive remained at a "Russian safe house", where it was divided up by persons unknown.

On 22 February 1994 at Moscow's Sheremetyevo airport an Israeli of Russian descent was arrested and his luggage searched. Part of the archive was found and confiscated. The cache contained manuscripts by the poets Khlebnikov, Mandelstam and Akhmatova and letters written by Malevich. This part of the archive was transferred to the Russian State Archive of Literature and Art.

Found with the seized documents was a paragraph-long agreement between Krystyna Gmurzynska and Nikolai Khardzhiev to provide "material support" of US$2.5 million to the Khardzhievs in Amsterdam. This was witnessed by Lidia Khardzhiev, Weststeijn and Rastorfer. The Gmurzynska gallery arranged the packing and removal of the couple's flat, but little of their archive ever reached them. Once in possession of the collection, Rastorfer would claim that the signed documents were merely 'letters of intent'. The case was also covered by Tony Wood in 'New Left Review'. Gmurzynska filed a number of unsuccessful libel actions against many of those who helped to investigate the case.

Both Gmurzynska and Rastorfer later denied any involvement in the smuggling of the archive, stating that they had advanced a sum of money to the Khardzhievs for the couple's move. Khardzhiev retained ownership of the section of the archive transferred to the State Archive, and he blocked access to the papers until 2015.

On July 27, 1995, Khardzhiev made a will leaving everything to Lidia, with the instruction that she choose what part of his collection was given to the Khardzhiev-Chaga Art Foundation in Amsterdam. Lidia died in November of that year in suspicious circumstances after allegedly falling down the stairs at their home. In Khardzhiev's last interview, in December 1995, he said that Nicolas Iljine had approached him on behalf of the Russian authorities, trying to negotiate the return of some of his paintings or part of his archive. When he died in June 1996, he left his art collection to the foundation, and later the foundation and the State Archive of the Russian Federation agreed to administer Khardzhiev's archive. In 2013, many of the works from the Khardzhiev collection were included in a major retrospective on Malevich held at the Stedelijk Museum in Amsterdam. A definitive catalogue of the collection was published by the Stedelijk in October 2013.
