= Triumph of Neptune and Amphitrite =

Painting by Nicolas Poussin, c. 1636

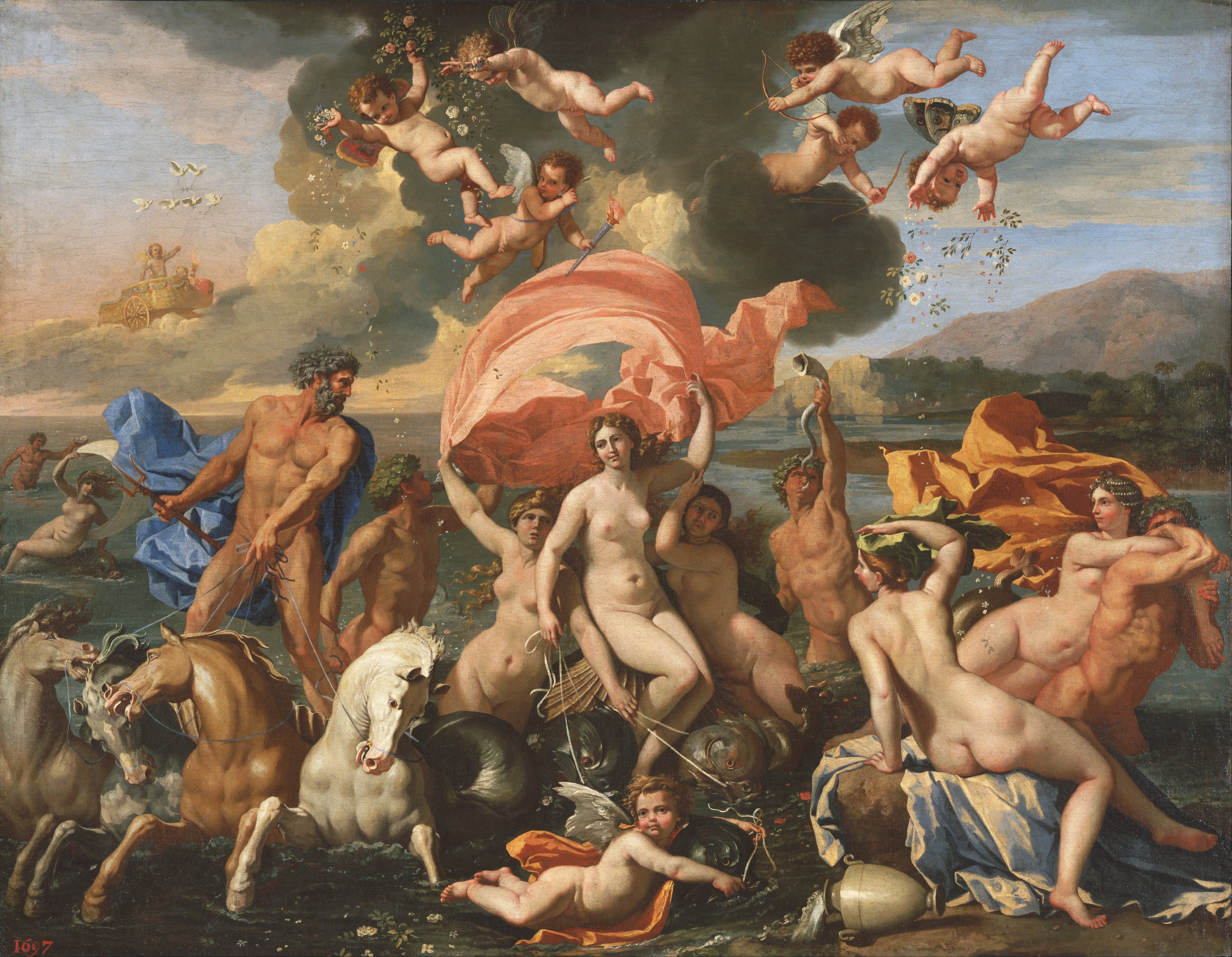
Triumph of Neptune and Amphitrite (c. 1635-1636) by Nicolas Poussin

The Triumph of Neptune and Amphitrite (or Birth of Venus) by Nicolas Poussin, painted in 1635 or 1636, is a painting housed in Philadelphia in the Philadelphia Museum of Art. It is in oil on canvas (114,4 x 146,6 cm) and shows a group of figures in the sea near a beach, with putti flying over their heads.

This mythological scene clearly depicts Poseidon (or Neptune to the Romans), bearded and muscular, with four horses and a trident, to the left. But it is not clear whether the central female figure, sitting on a shell boat, is intended as Venus, Poseidon's wife Amphitrite, or Galatea.

It seems that the oldest recorded title is il trionfo di Nettunno by Giovanni Pietro Bellori (d. 1698). The matter was the subject of considerable scholarly debate in the 1960s, and Anthony Blunt concluded that Poussin was working on ideas for all these subjects, and the painting "bears the marks of the other subjects, though it represents Neptune and Amphitrite".

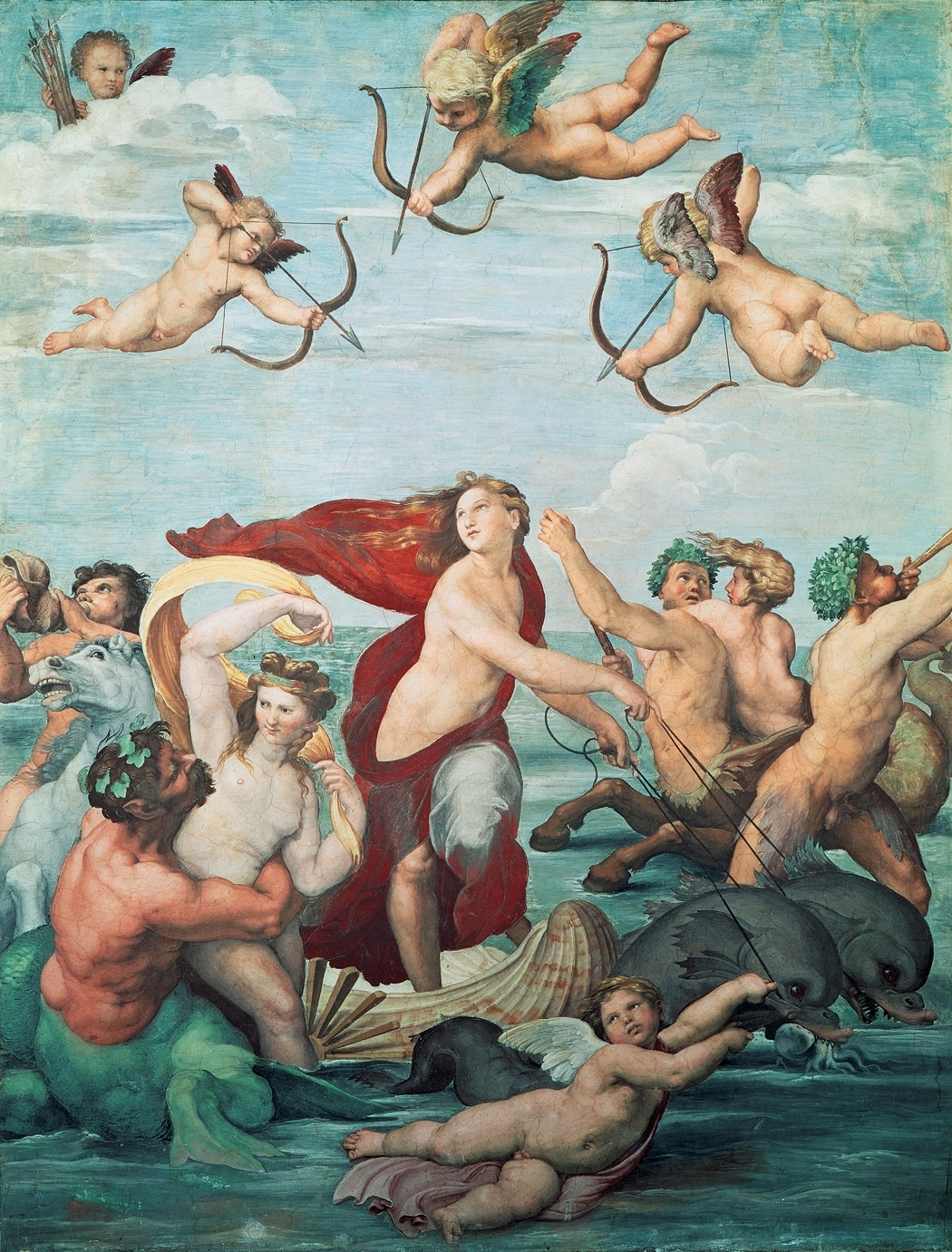
Raphael's Triumph of Galatea, 1512, fresco

Sandro Botticelli, The Birth of Venus (c. 1484–1486). Tempera on canvas. 172.5 cm × 278.9 cm (67.9 in × 109.6 in). Uffizi, Florence

The depiction is somewhat similar to the Birth of Venus by Sandro Botticelli, showing the arrival of Venus after her birth at sea. There are small details, like the chariot in the clouds on the left side, that represent typical features of Venus. Raphael's Triumph of Galatea, from which the putto below the central female was directly copied, also seems to have influenced the composition.

Poussin would certainly have known the Raphael from prints, and probably saw the original, which was in the Villa Farnesina in a suburb of Rome. The Botticelli, then in a Medici family country house near Florence, was then far less famous and less accessible.

The painting was painted for Cardinal Richelieu, and later belonged to Catherine the Great of Russia, and was in the Hermitage Museum in St Petersburg until sold by the Russian government in 1932.

== See also ==
- List of paintings by Nicolas Poussin
