= Venus with a Mirror =

Painting by Titian

- Artist: Titian
- Year: 1555
- Medium: oil on canvas
- Dimensions: 124.5 cm × 105.5 cm (49.0 in × 41.5 in)
- Location: National Gallery of Art, Washington, D.C.

Venus with a Mirror (c. 1555) is a painting by Titian, now in the National Gallery of Art in Washington, DC, and it is considered to be one of the collection's highlights.

The pose of the Venus resembles the classical statues of the Venus de' Medici in Florence or the Capitoline Venus in Rome, which Titian may have seen when he wrote that was "learning from the marvelous ancient stones." The painting is said to celebrate the ideal beauty of the female form, or to be a critique of vanity, or perhaps both. It was copied by several later artists, including Peter Paul Rubens and Anthony van Dyck.

Titian made a number of paintings of the same subject, but this is believed to be the earliest and the only version to be entirely by the hand of Titian, without additions by his assistants. It remained in his house until his death in 1576.

== Painting, and versions ==
X-rays of the painting have revealed that Titian painted it over a double portrait which he had abandoned. Titian kept the red cloak of one of the figures in the abandoned painting and placed it under Venus's arm. The use of the cloak from the earlier painting probably played a large part in the composition of the new painting.

Titian is believed to have made another version of this Venus for the Venetian lawyer Niccolo Crasso, who also commissioned Titian to paint the Retable of Saint Nicholas de Bari at about the same time. A drawing of the other version was included by Anthony van Dyck in the sketchbook made during his trip to Italy. This other version is now lost, but a studio copy exists in the Hermitage Museum.

Titian is thought to have made a second copy, which was sent to his regular patron King Philip II of Spain, in 1567. This version was also lost, but a copy of it by Peter Paul Rubens exists, which is in the Thyssen-Bornemisza Museum in Madrid.

== Other versions ==
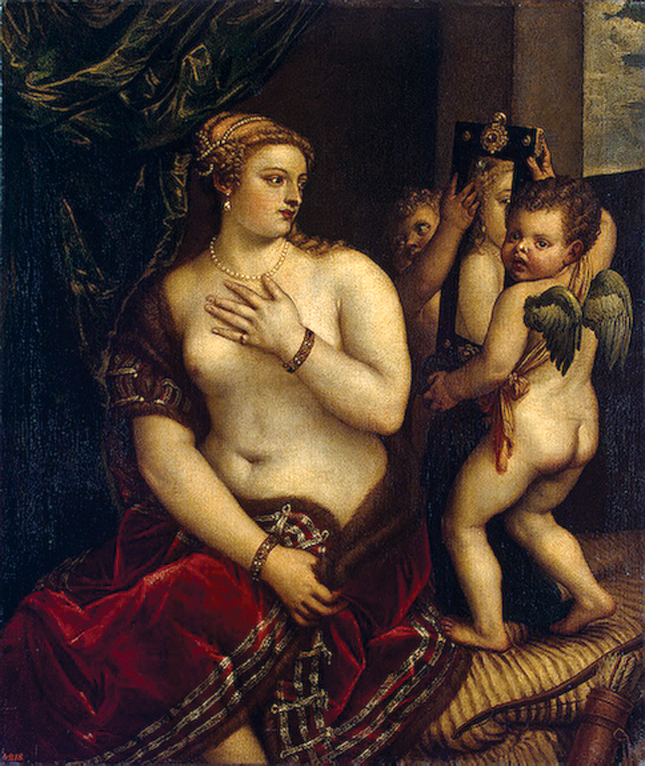
Studio version still in the Hermitage, originally from the collection of Empress Josephine, Malmaison

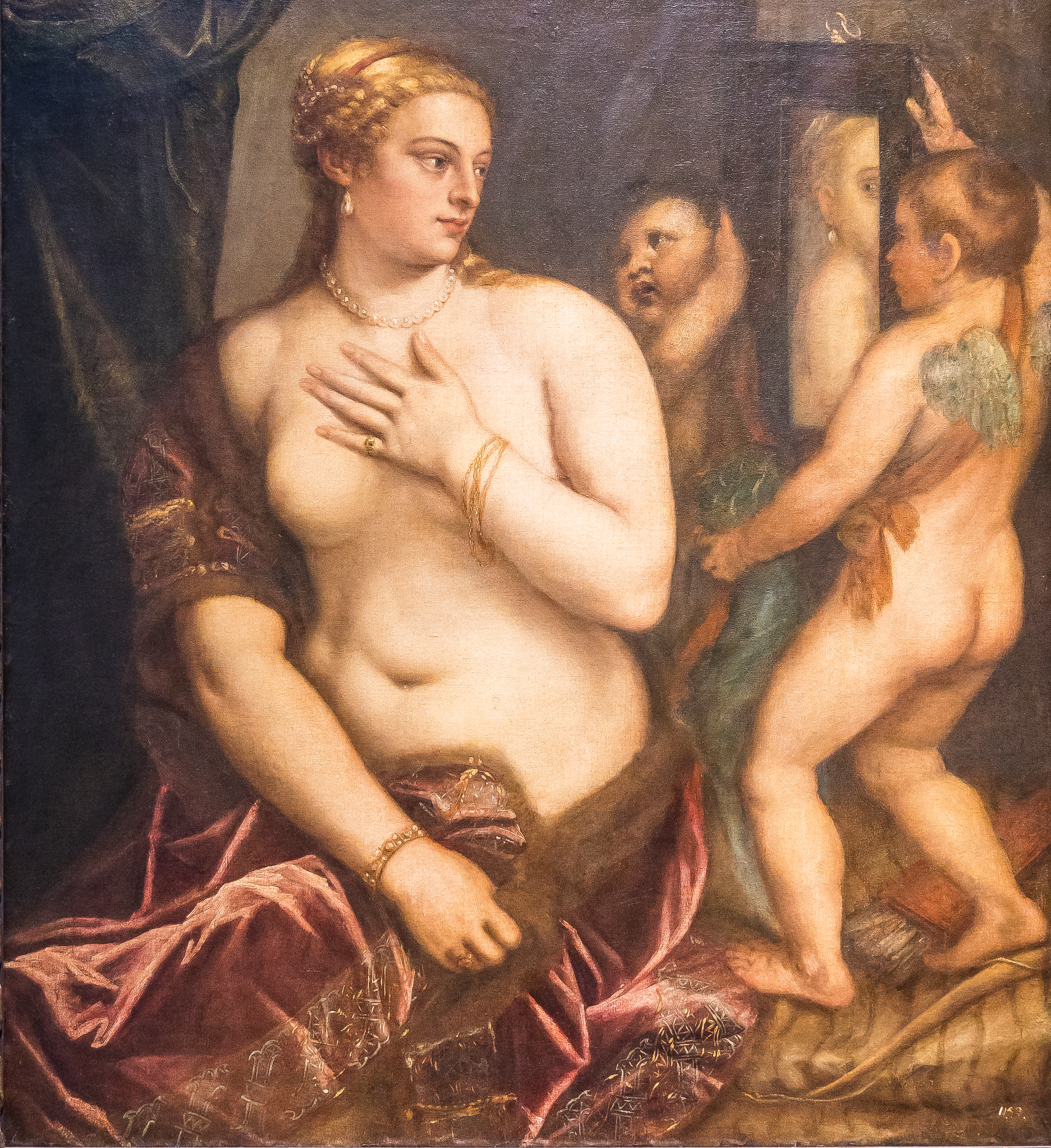
Version in the Wallraf-Richartz-Museum, Cologne

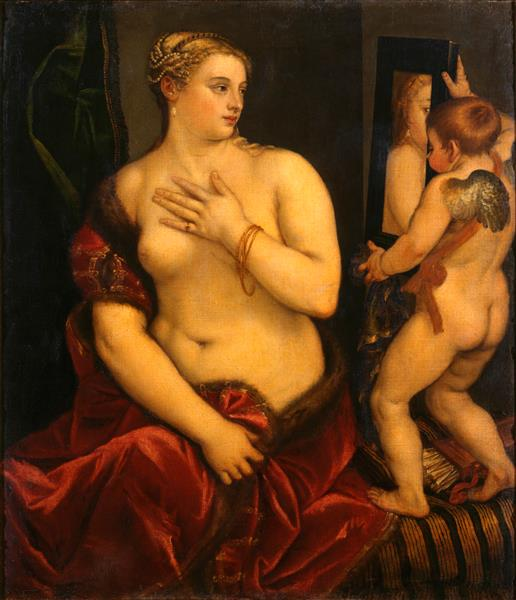
Version in the Gemäldegalerie Alte Meister, Dresden

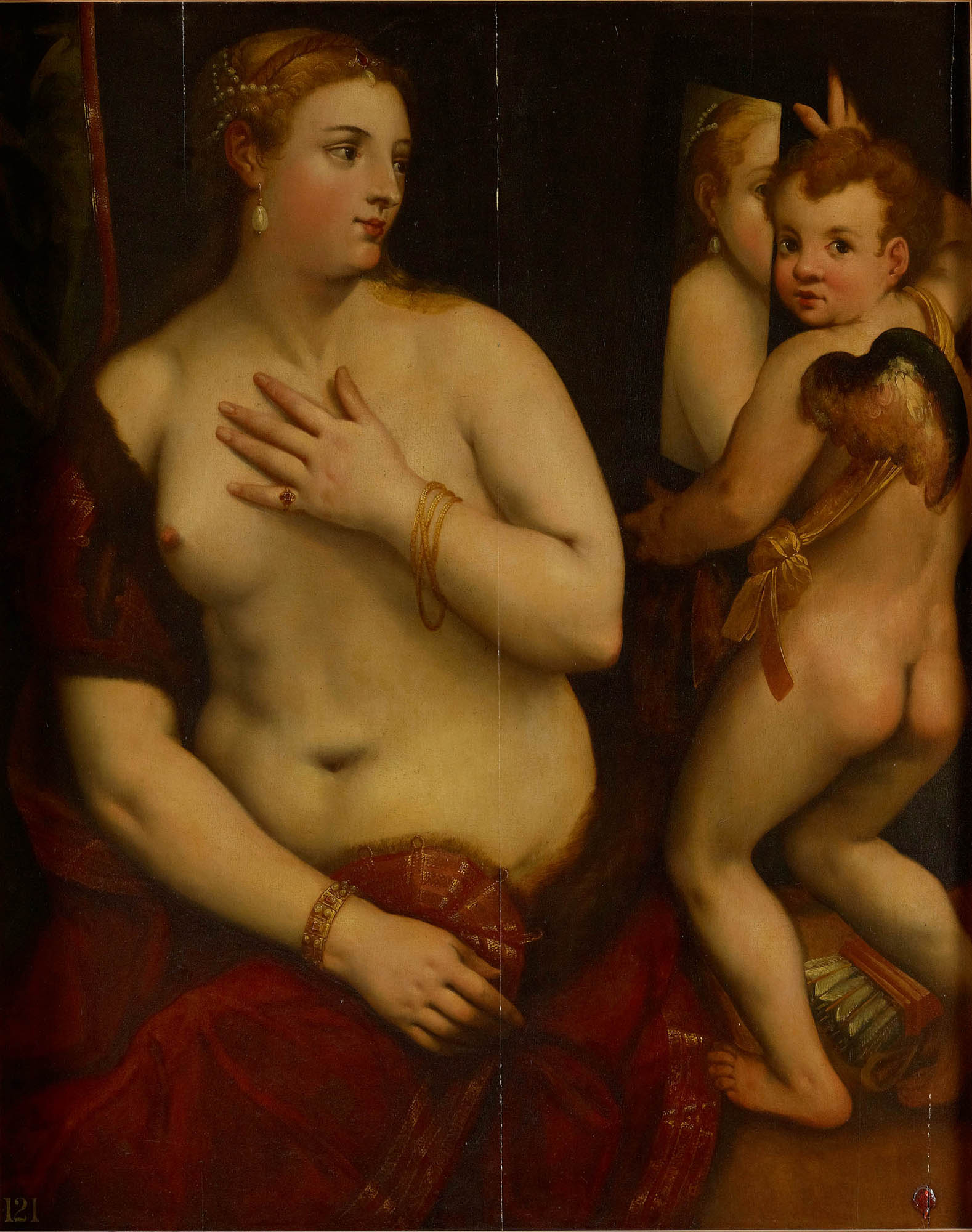
Version in the UK Royal collection since the 1720s

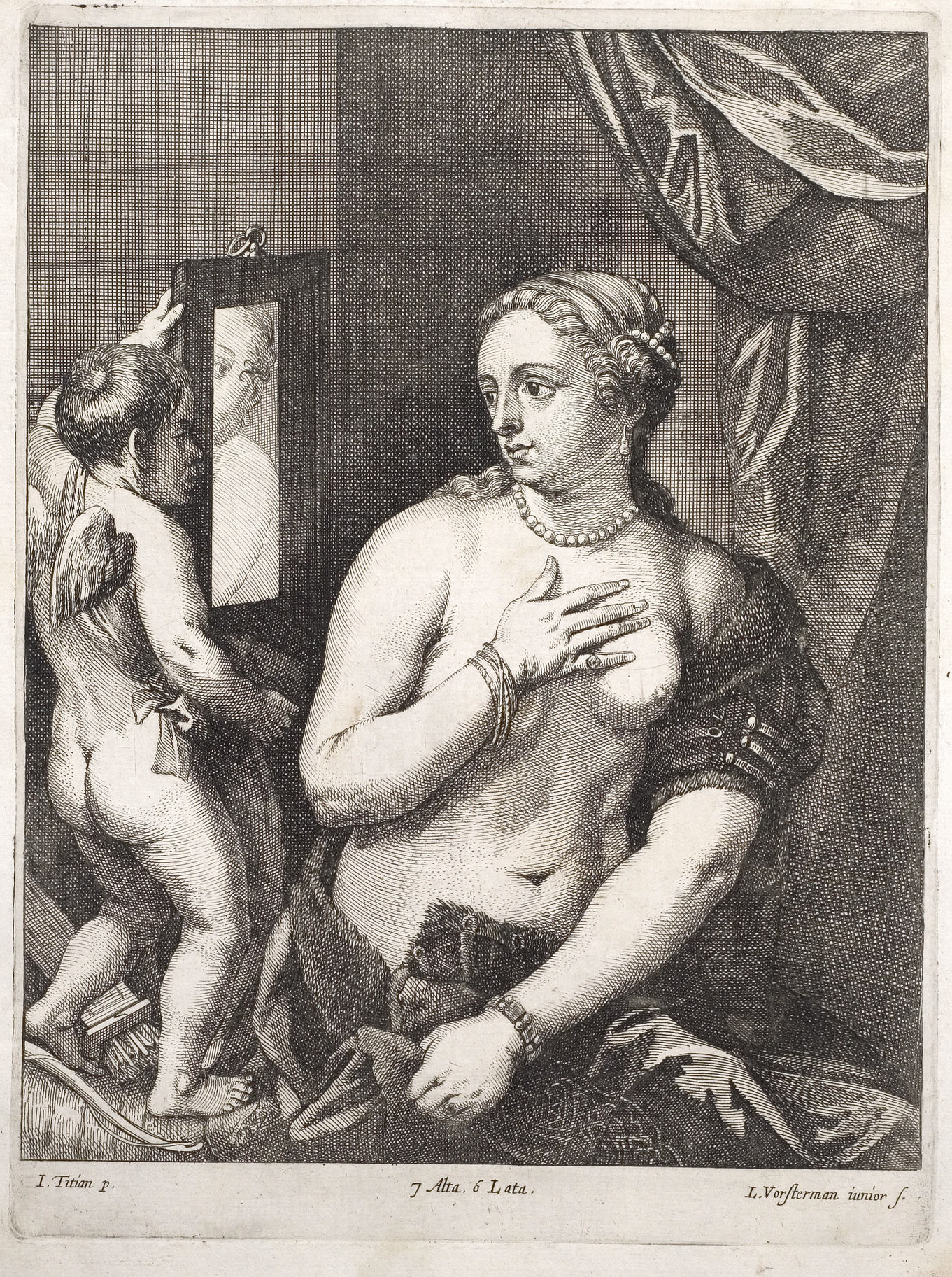
Engraving by Lucas Vorsterman II after Titian for the Theatrum Pictorium

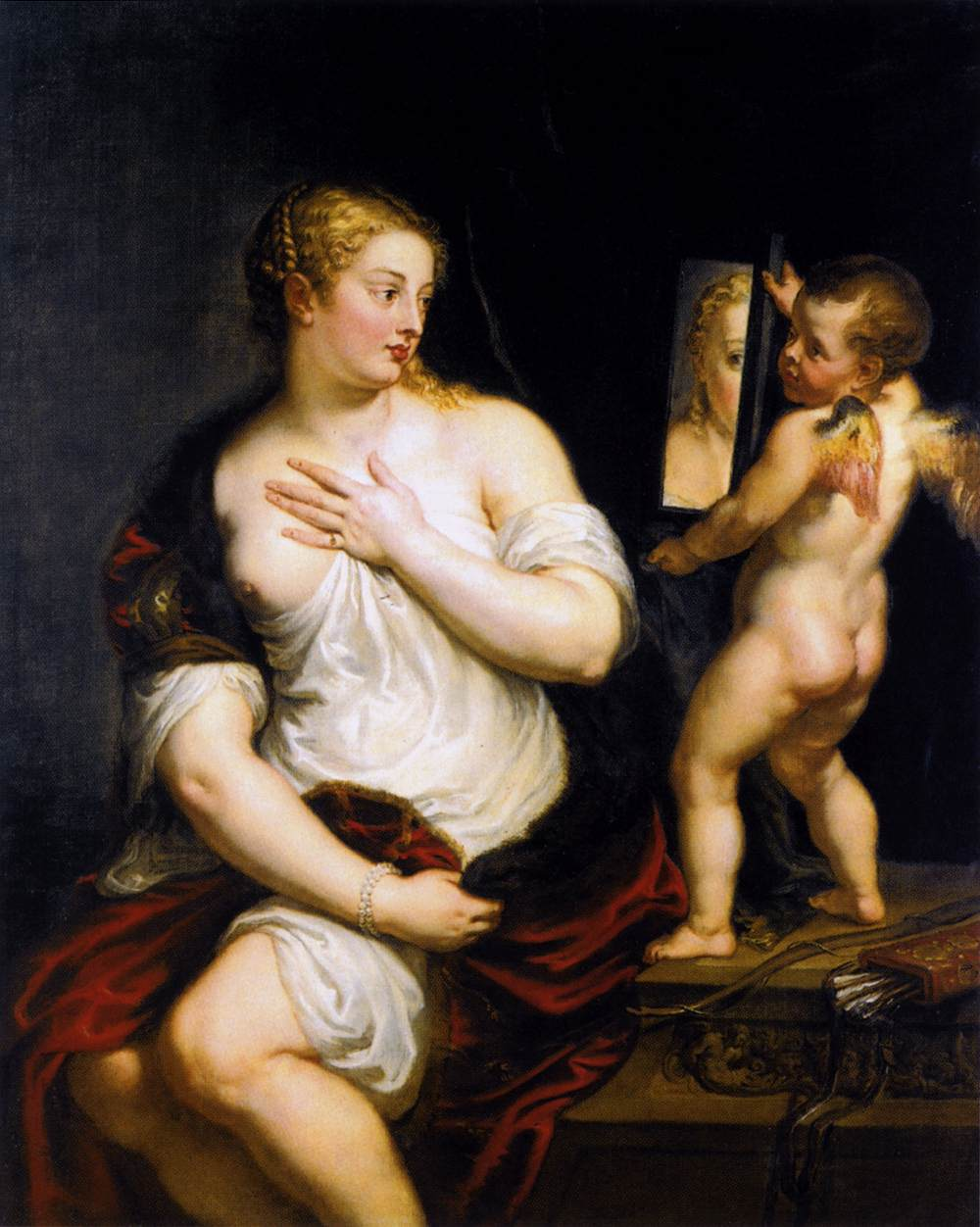
Venus at her Toilet by Peter Paul Rubens, about 1608. This is believed to be a copy Rubens made of the Titian commissioned by Philip II of Spain

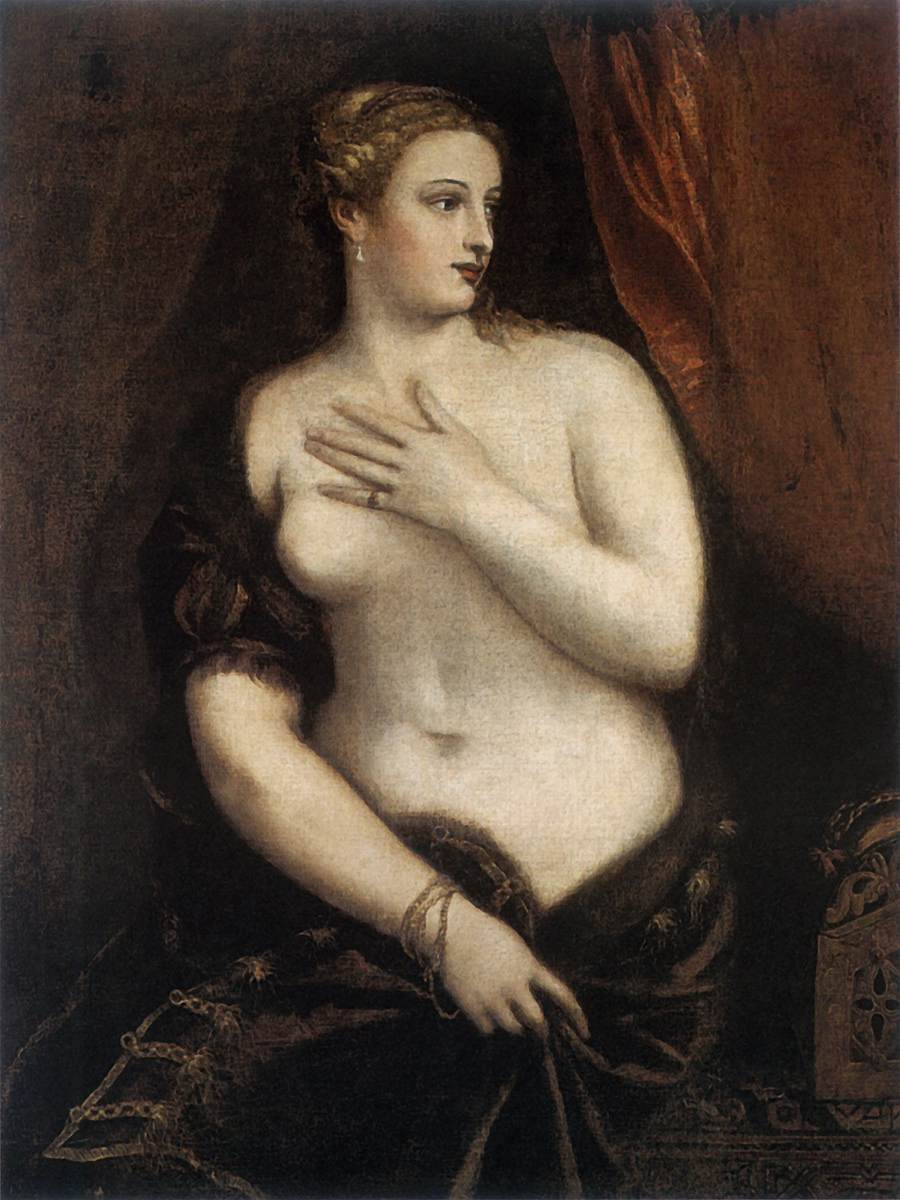
Version without Cupid or the Mirror, Galleria Franchetti, Venice

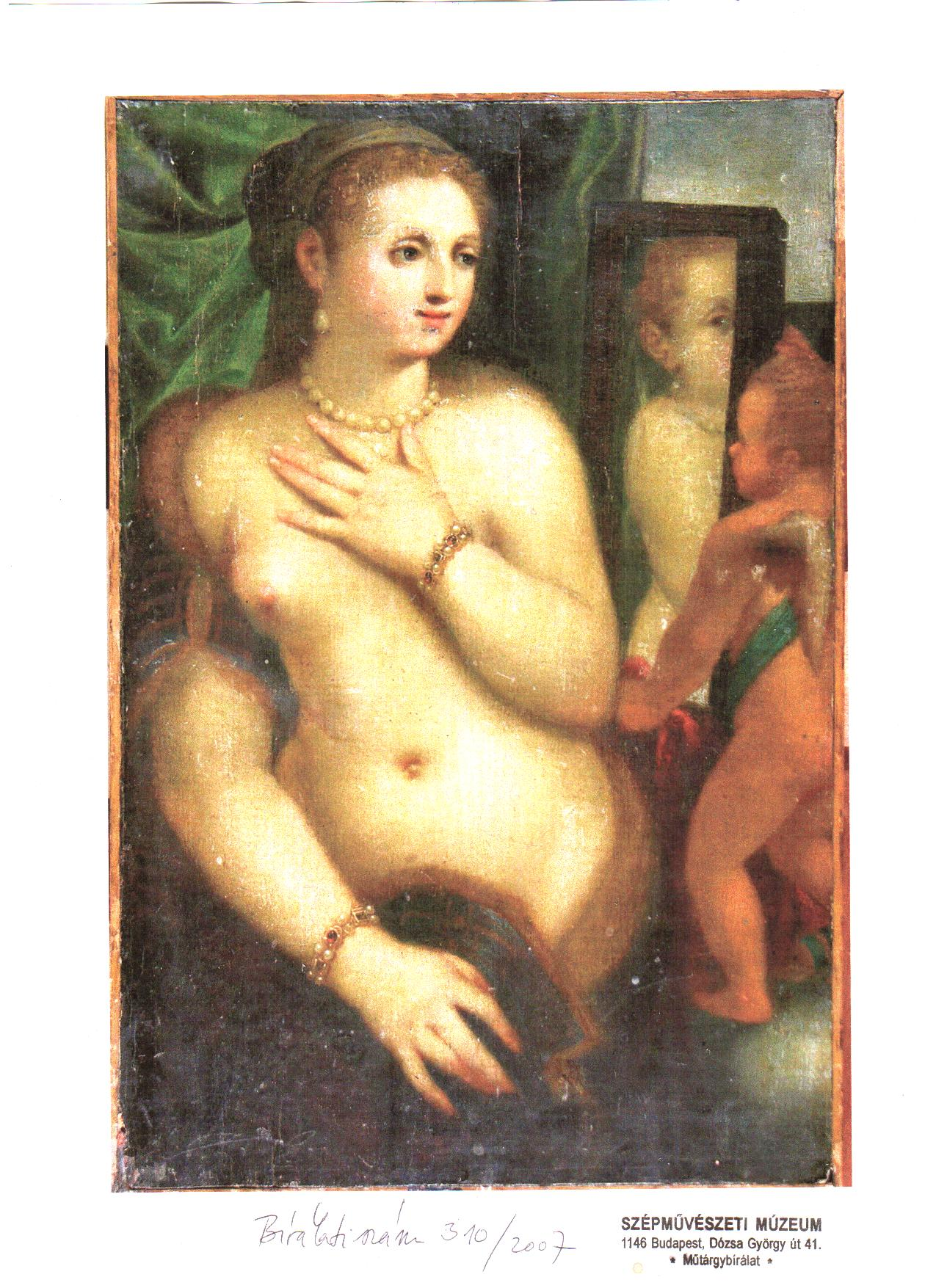
Venus with a Mirror (sketch)

== Provenance ==
In 1581, five years after Titian's death, the contents of his house in Venice, including the Venus with a Mirror, were sold by his son and heir Pomponio Vechellio to Christoforo Barbarigo. In 1850 the Russian Consul-General in Venice, A. Kvostov, purchased the painting, along with a large number of other masterpieces, from the Barbarigo family, for Czar Nicholas I for the sum of 525,000 francs, and it entered the collection of the Hermitage Museum in Saint Petersburg.

In 1931, in order to earn foreign currency for the first of the five-year plans for the national economy of the Soviet Union, Joseph Stalin and the Soviet government secretly sold the painting, along with a number of other masterpieces, to a syndicate of art dealers, who sold it to the American collector Andrew Mellon, who wished to create a national art museum for the United States. Mellon donated it to the United States Government in 1937. It was one of the first masterpieces to be displayed in the National Gallery of Art in Washington when it opened in 1941.

== Works that may have influenced Titian ==
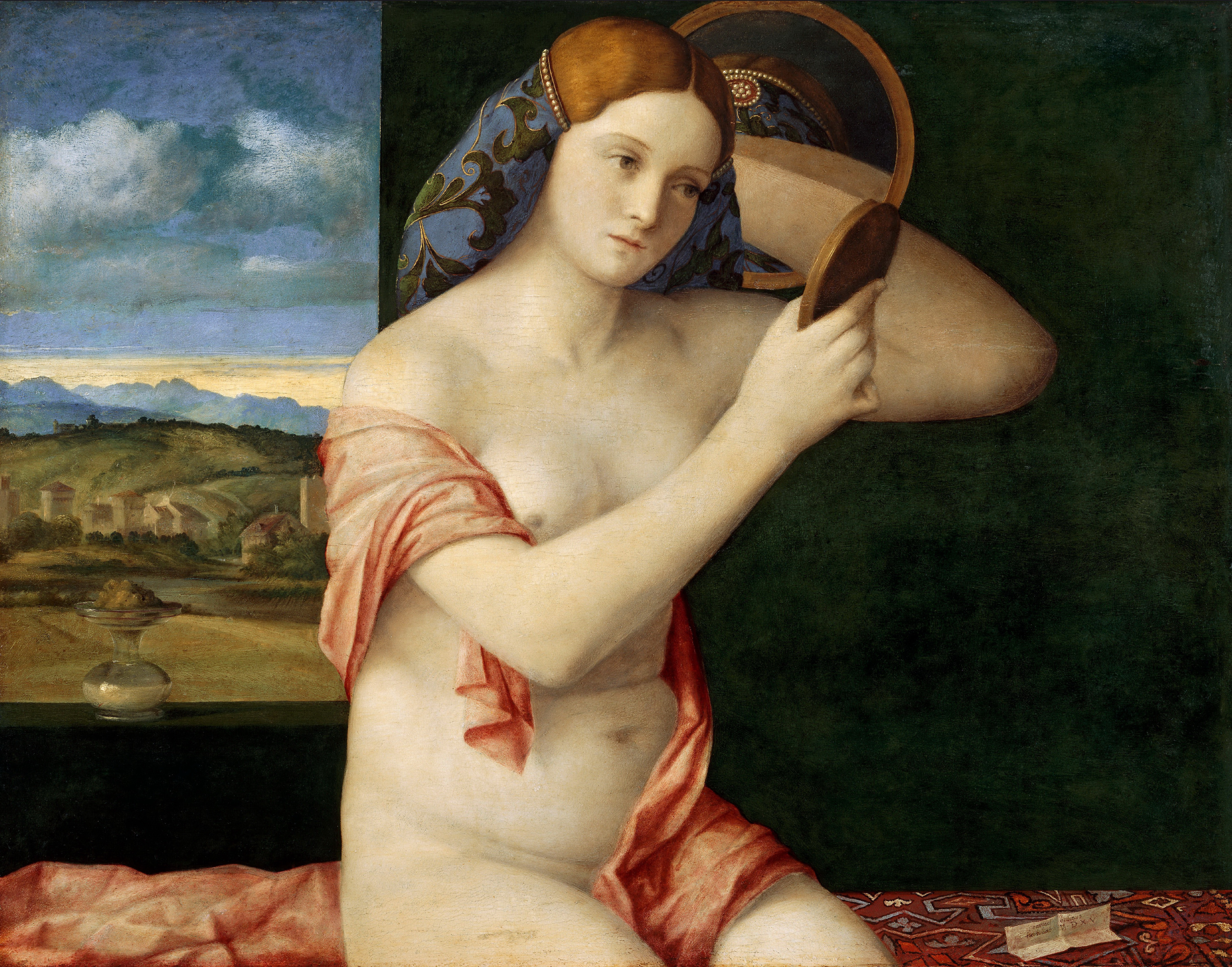
Woman with a Mirror, by Giovanni Bellini (1515). Titian had worked as a pupil in the studio of Bellini, and adopted Bellini's rich and sensuous colors.

The pose of the painting may have been influenced by Ancient Greek and Roman statues of Venus Titian could have seen in Rome and Florence. He was also influenced by his teacher Giovanni Bellini, who was the leader of the Venetian school of painters, known for their masterful use of color.

== Influence of the painting ==
The theme of the painting was adapted by a number of later artists, including Peter Paul Rubens and Diego Velázquez.

The painting itself was the inspiration for the protagonist Severin's imagination in the 1870 novel Venus in Furs by Leopold von Sacher-Masoch.

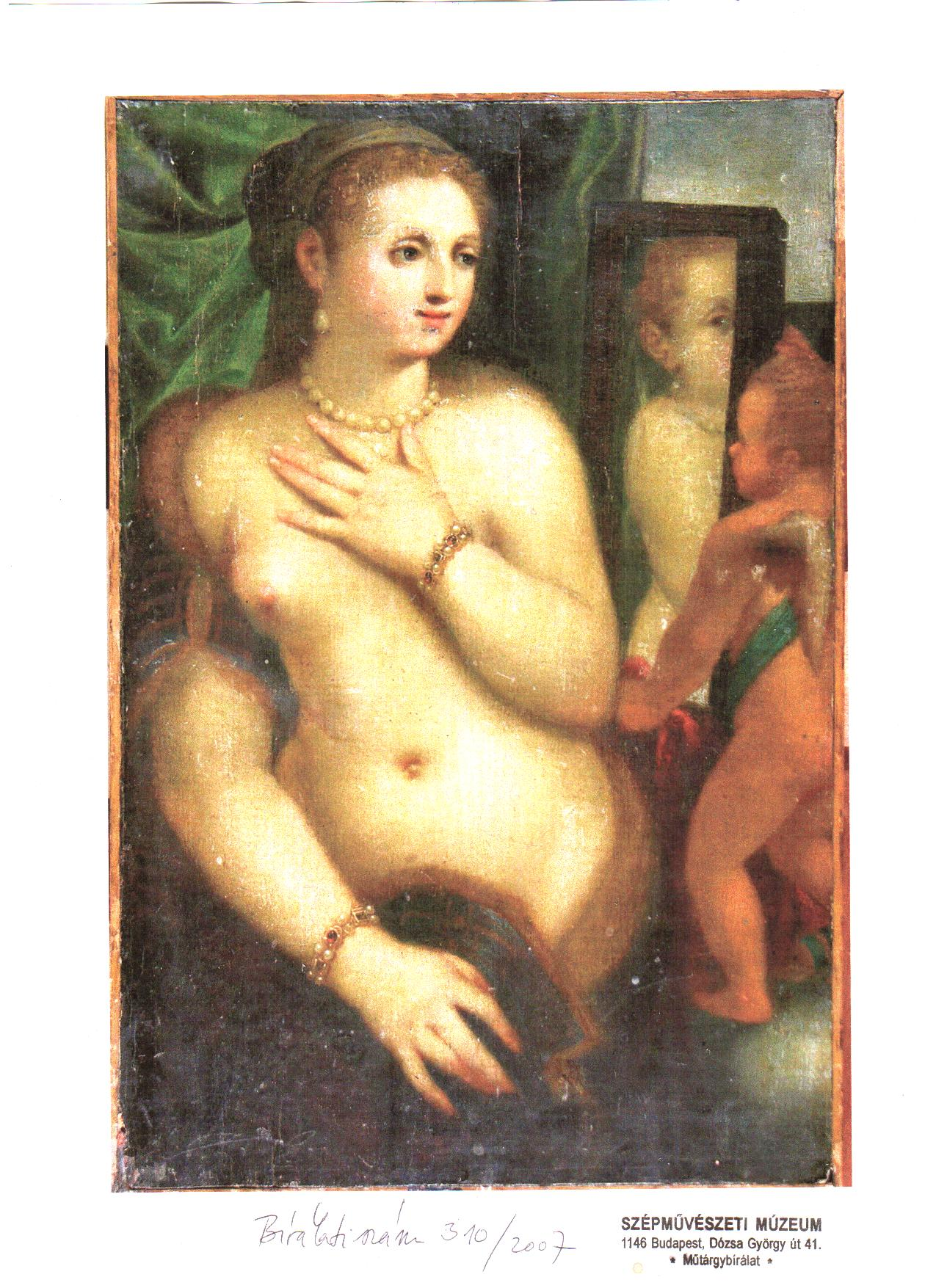
Palma il Giovane ?

The theme of the painting could be adapted by Palma il Giovane, or was painted by Titian himself in 1511.

== Gallery, influences ==
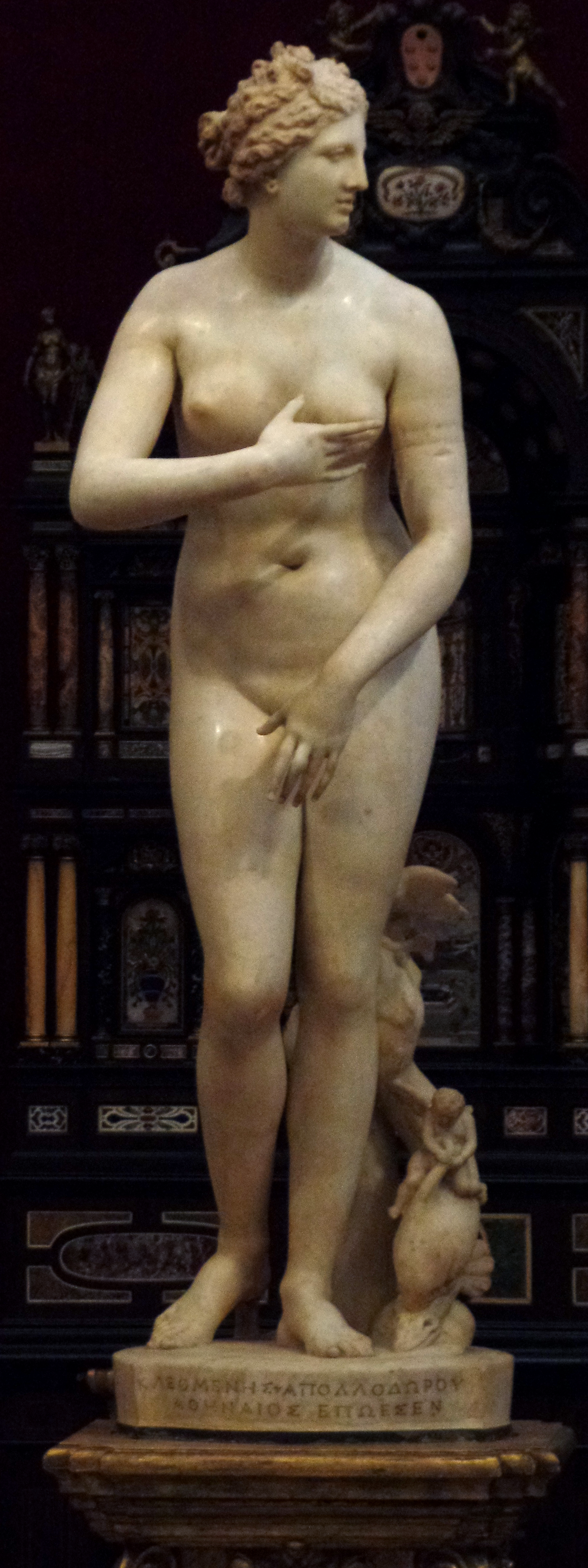
A work that may have influenced Titian is Venus de' Medici in the Uffizi gallery in Florence

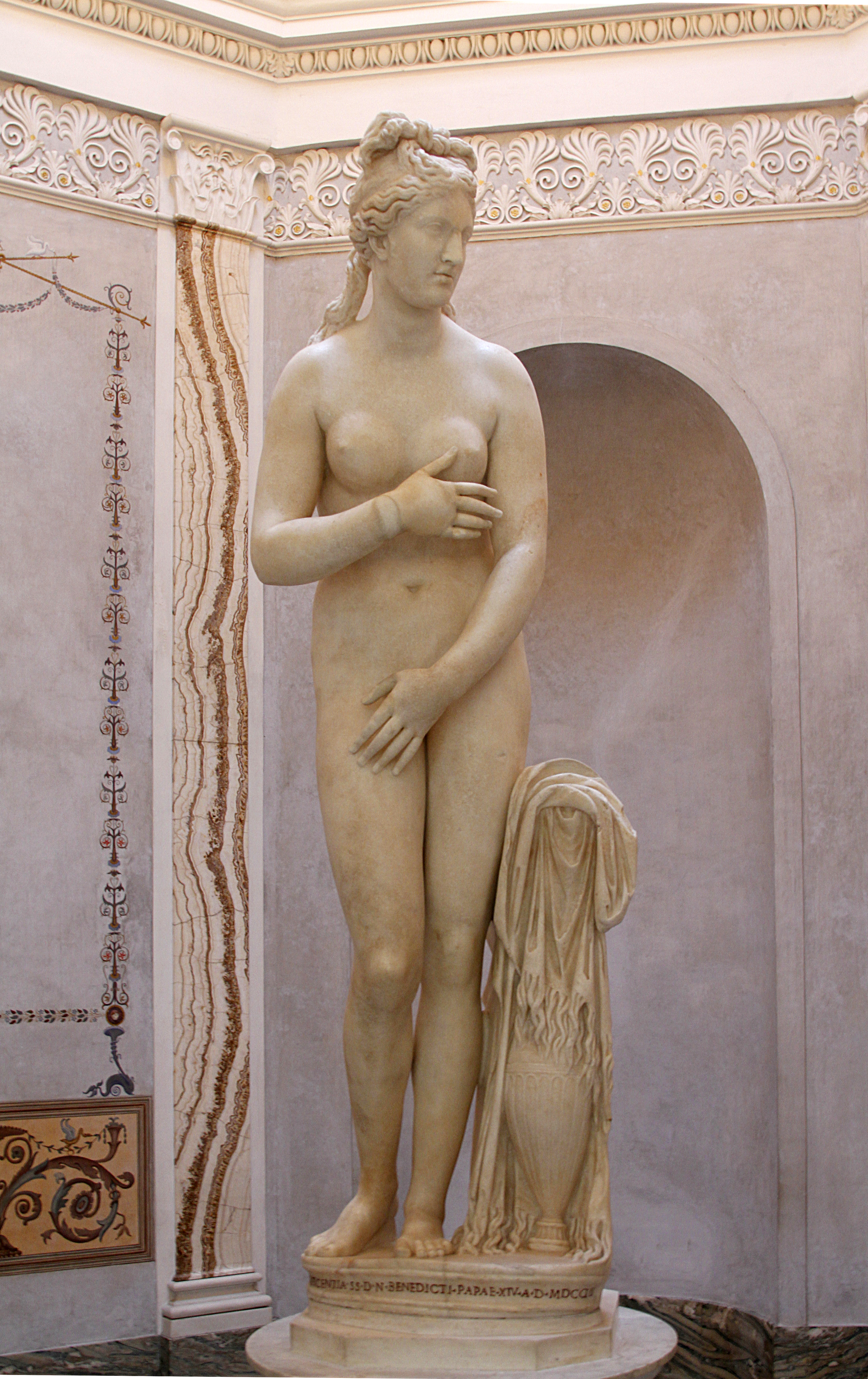
Another work that may have influenced Titian is Capitoline Venus at the Capitoline Museums in Rome

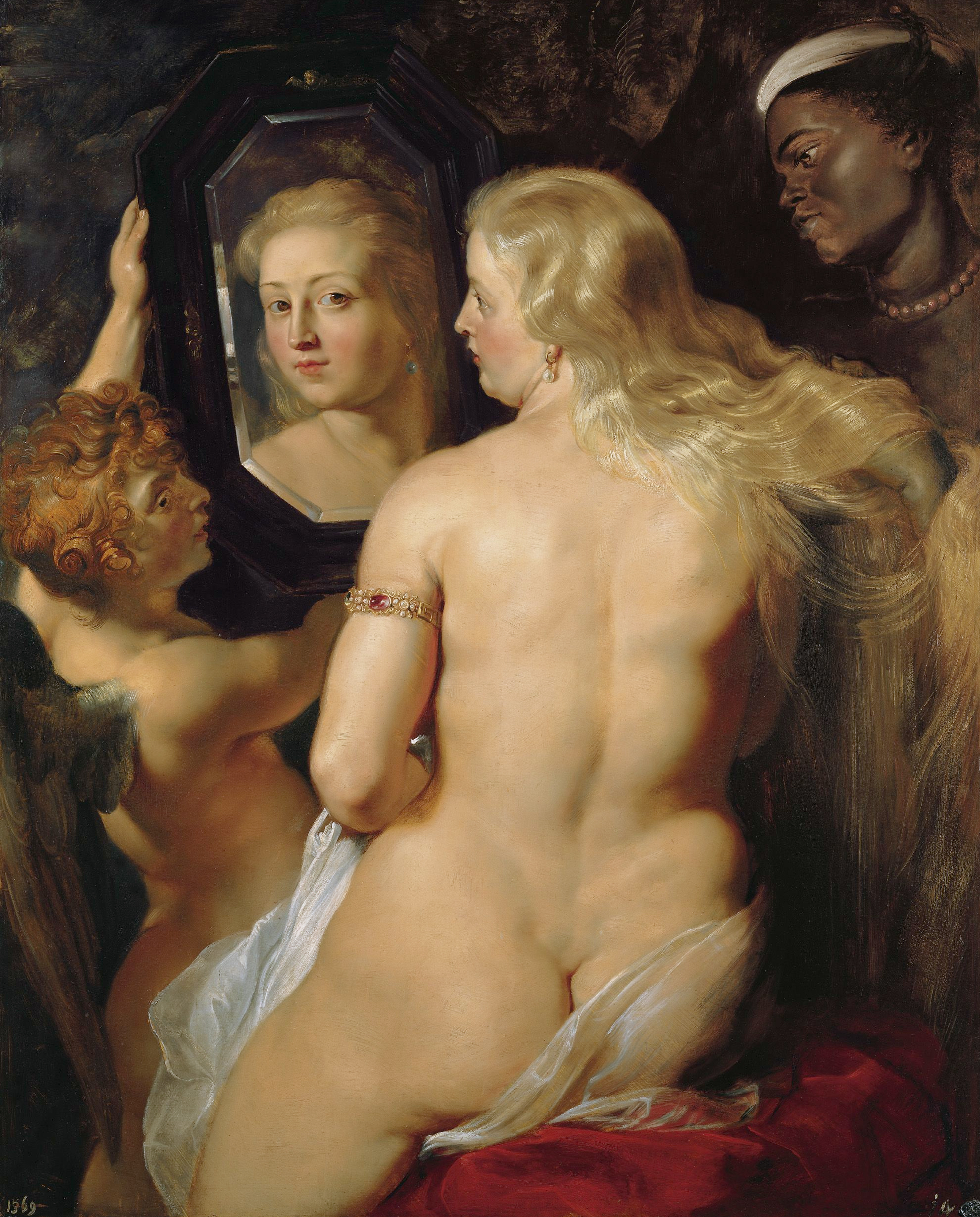
Venus at a Mirror by Peter Paul Rubens (1615). Rubens adapted the theme to his own style.

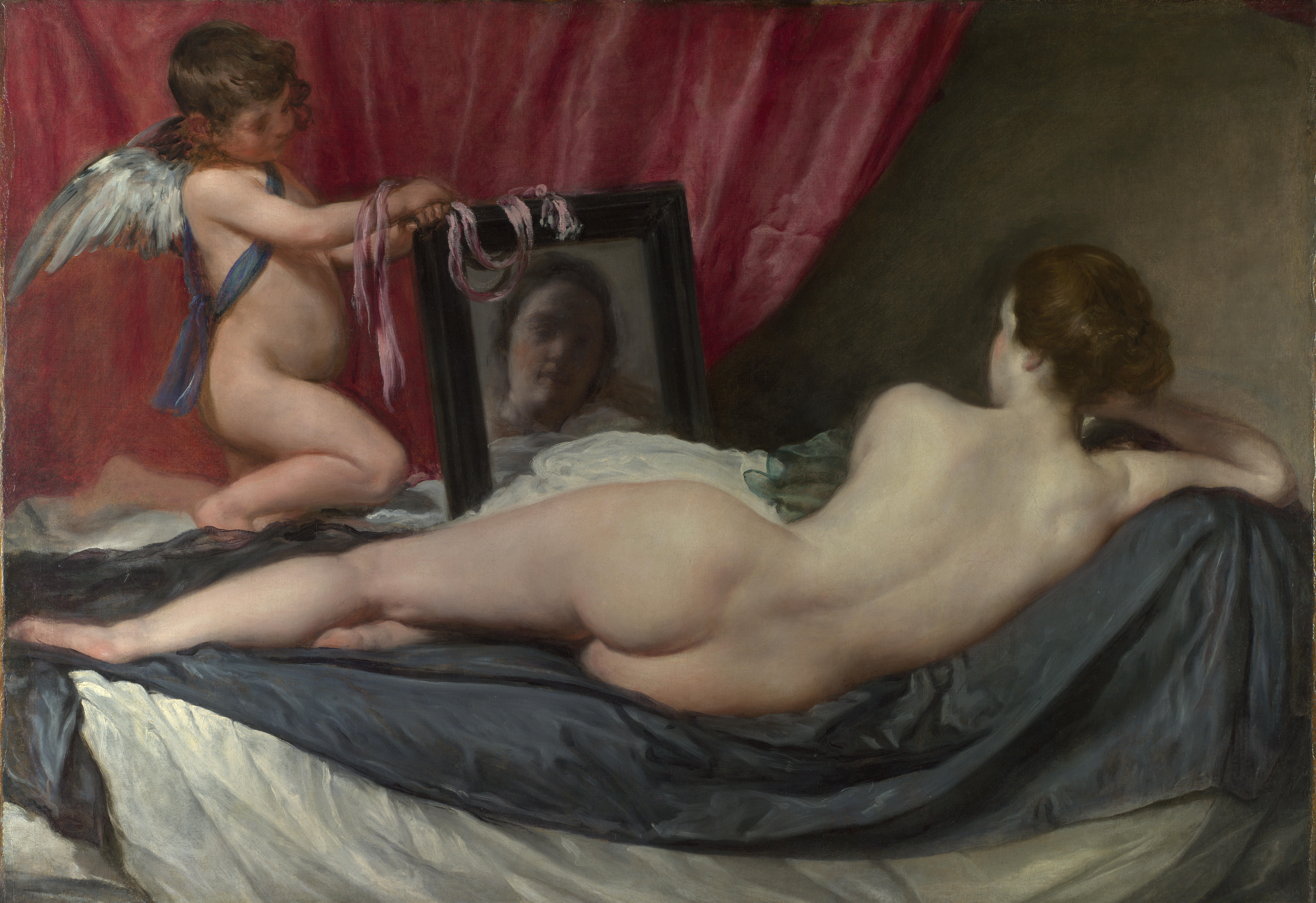
The Rokeby Venus by Diego Velázquez. (1599–1660). Completed between 1647 and 1651. Velazquez would have seen a copy of Titian's Venus with a Mirror which was commissioned by King Philip II of Spain.

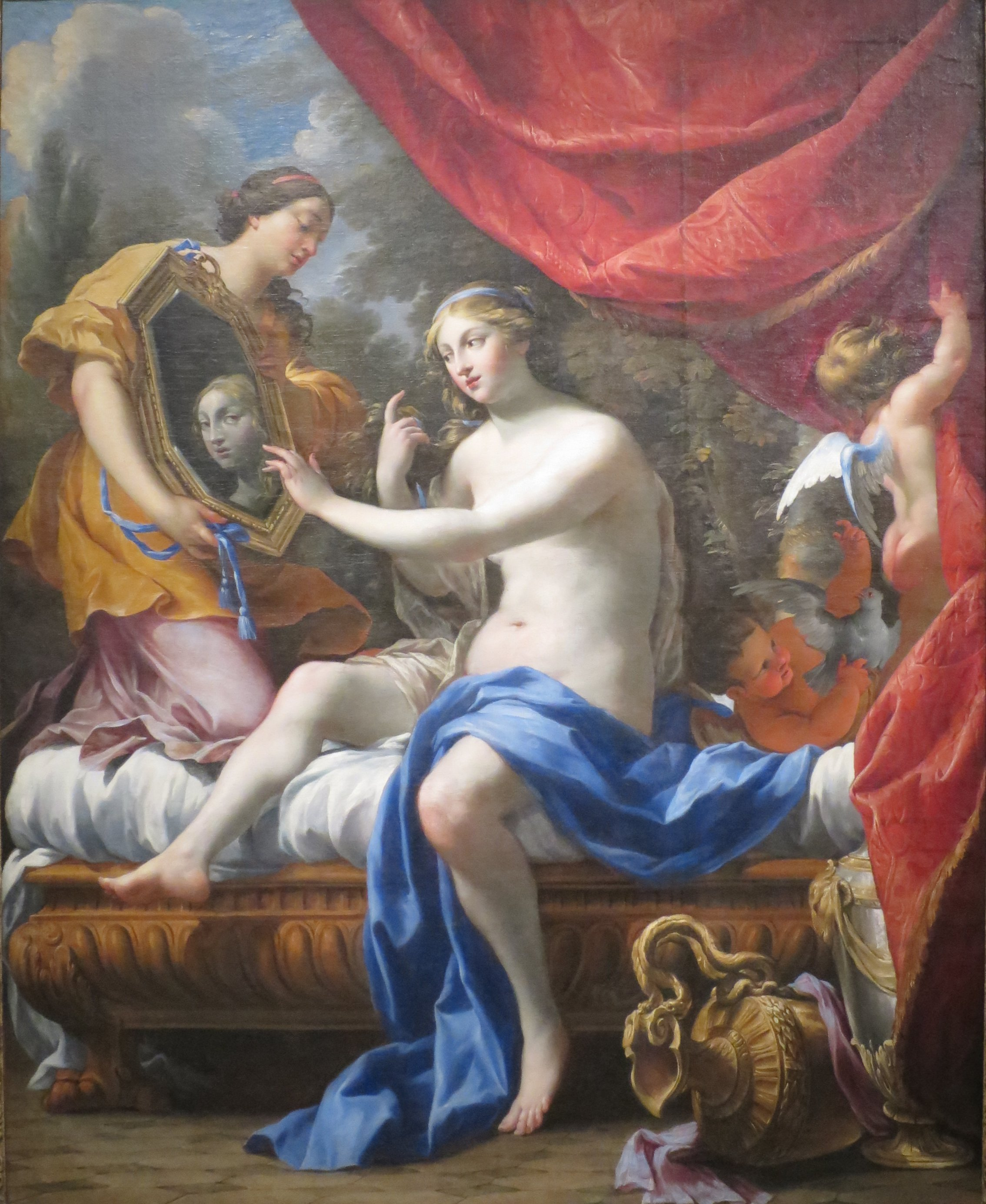
Simon Vouet, The Toilet of Venus, about 1628. Simon Vouet lived in Italy from 1613 to 1627, and was certainly familiar with the work of Titian. He imported the Italian style into France.

== See also ==
- List of paintings in the National Gallery of Art, Washington DC, formerly in the Hermitage Museum
- Venus in Furs, a novel containing great reference to the painting.
