= Alba Madonna =

Painting by Raphael

- Artist: Raphael
- Year: c. 1510
- Type: Oil transferred from wood to canvas
- Dimensions: 94.5 cm diameter (37 1/4 in)
- Location: National Gallery of Art, Washington, D.C.

The Alba Madonna is a tondo (circular) oil on wood transferred to canvas painting by the Italian High Renaissance artist Raphael, created c. 1510, depicting Mary, Jesus, and John the Baptist in a typical Italian countryside.

After a century and a half in Italy, it was in the collection of the Dukes of Alba in Spain until 1836, when it was sold to Nicholas I of Russia, and it became one of the highlights of the Imperial Hermitage Museum in Saint Petersburg. Clandestinely sold to Andrew W. Mellon by the government of the Soviet Union in 1931, it has been held by the National Gallery of Art in Washington, D.C., since 1937.

== Description ==
John the Baptist is holding up a cross to Jesus, which the baby Jesus is grasping. All three figures are contemplating the cross, which is being accepted by Jesus as a token of the Crucifixion. The three figures are grouped to the left in the round design, but the image is balanced by the outstretched left arm of the Madonna holding a book, and the billowing material of her cloak, with the figures arranged in a pyramidal composition. Arranged about the figures are symbolic flowers: lady's bedstraw for childbirth, cyclamen for love and sorrow, violets for humility, dandelions and red-centred anemones for the Passion of Jesus.

The tondo painting, on a round wood panel with diameter 94.5 cm (37.2 in), was commissioned by Paolo Giovio, after Raphael had left Florence in 1508 to live in Rome. The painting show development from his earlier work, perhaps inspired by the Sistine Chapel ceiling then being painted by Michelangelo.

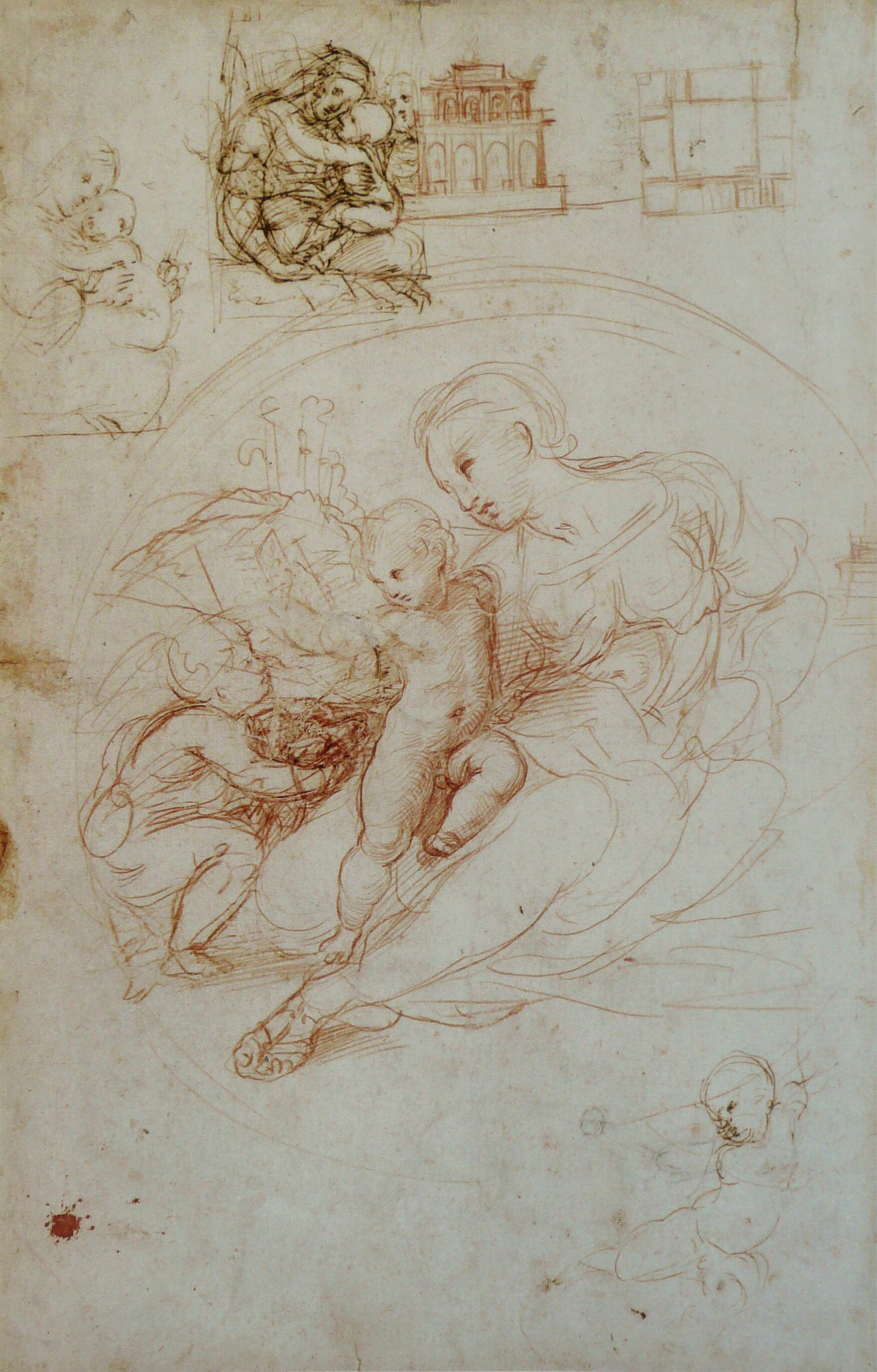
Raphael's study for what became the Alba Madonna, with other sketches, Palais des Beaux-Arts de Lille

Art historian Andrew Graham-Dixon has described the painting as "a breathtakingly beautiful work of art", linking her position on the ground to the iconography of the Madonna of Humility, but "her statuesque grandeur calls to mind earlier Renaissance images of the Madonna della Misericordia – images of the Virgin as Queen of Heaven and protectress of all humanity."

== Provenance ==
Giovio became Bishop of Nocera de' Pagani in 1528, and he donated the painting to the Sanctuary of Santa Maria dei Miracoli in Nocera Inferiore. The painting was bought in 1686 by the Viceroy of Naples, Gaspar Méndez de Haro, 7th Marquis of Carpio, who took the painting to Spain. On his death the following year, it was inherited by his daughter; she married Francisco Álvarez de Toledo y Silva, who became the 10th Duke of Alba in 1711, and during the 18th century the painting belonged to the Spanish House of Alba, whose name it bears.

It was sold by the heirs of María Cayetana de Silva, 13th Duchess of Alba to the diplomat Edmund Bourke (1761–1821), then Danish Ambassador to Spain and later in France and England; and he sold the painting to William Gordon Coesvelt in London in 1820. In 1836 Coesvelt sold the painting to Nicholas I of Russia, who made it one of the highlights of the Imperial Hermitage Museum in Saint Petersburg. Almost a century later, in 1931, the government of the Soviet Union clandestinely sold it to Andrew W. Mellon, for 2.5 million rubles (about US$1.1 million ($23.3 million in 2025)). Mellon donated his collection to the National Gallery of Art in Washington, D.C., on its foundation in 1937, after a long squabble with the Roosevelt administration over his tax liabilities for the purchase.

During its time in the Hermitage, the painting would be transferred from a circular panel to a square canvas during the early nineteenth century. Through analysis of the painting, it was determined that the original panel was severely splitting down the center and on the right side. The canvas pattern is visible in the painting and the landscape on the far right was damaged in the transfer process.

During World War II the Alba Madonna was part of a group of over 100 pieces of art belonging to the National Gallery of Art that were transported by train to Asheville, North Carolina, where they were stored in the unfinished music room of the Vanderbilt mansion, Biltmore House. Done with the utmost secrecy, heavy steel doors were installed and bars were put in the windows of the barren music room. In 1944 after it became clear that the war would soon be over the paintings were moved back to the National Gallery of Art.

== See also ==
- List of paintings by Raphael
- Soviet sale of Hermitage paintings
- List of original Hermitage paintings in the National Gallery of Art
