= Saint George and the Dragon (Raphael) =

Painting by Raphael

St. George and the Dragon
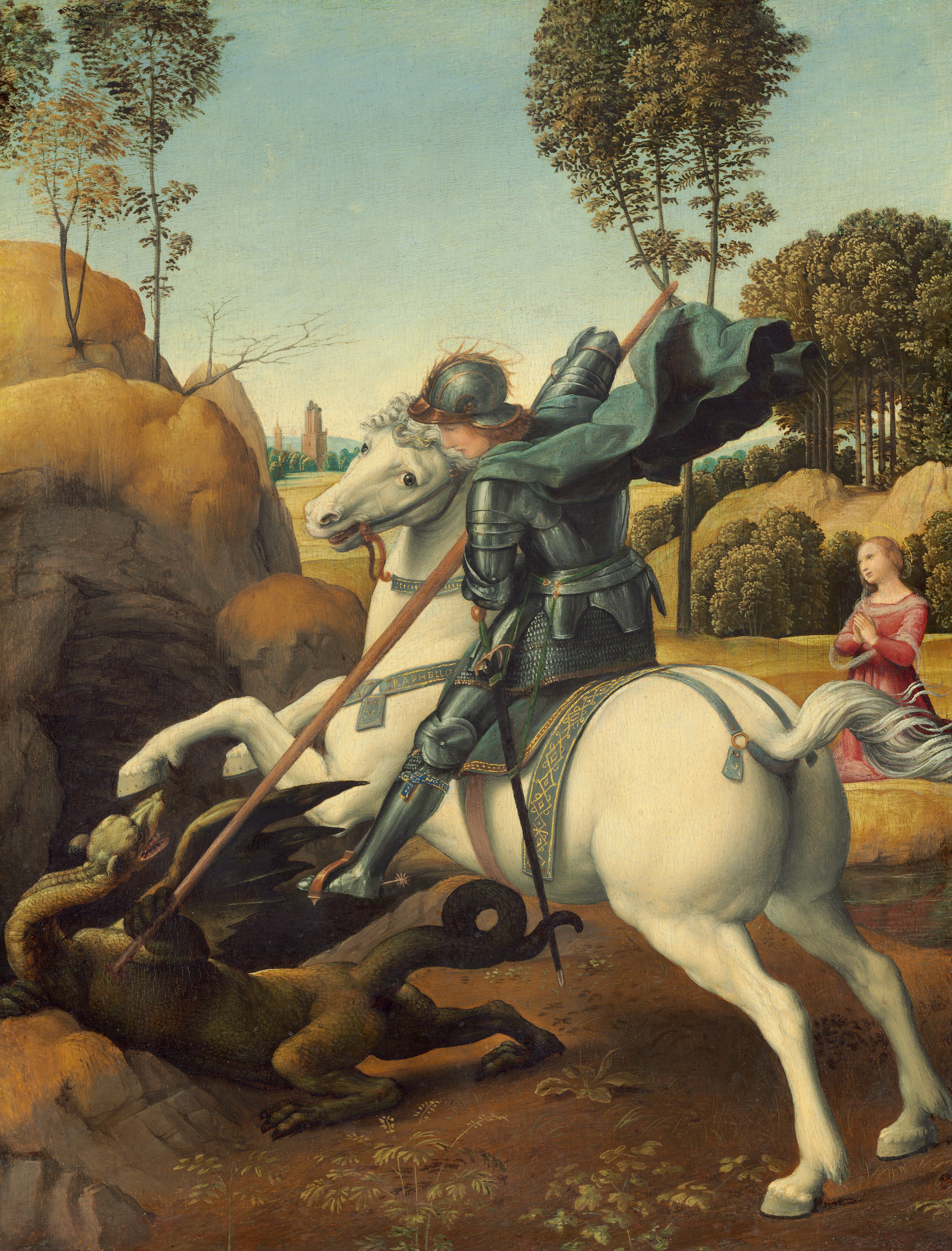
- Artist: Raphael
- Year: c. 1505
- Medium: Oil on wood
- Dimensions: 28.5 cm × 21.5 cm (11.2 in × 8.5 in)
- Location: National Gallery of Art, Washington, D.C.

St. George and the Dragon is a small oil on wood cabinet painting by the Italian High Renaissance artist Raphael, painted c. 1505, and now in the National Gallery of Art in Washington, D.C. The saint wears the blue garter of the English Order of the Garter, reflecting the award of this decoration in 1504 to Raphael's patron Guidobaldo da Montefeltro, Duke of Urbino, by King Henry VII of England. The first word of the order's motto, "HONI" can be made out. The painting was presumably commissioned by the Duke, either to present to the English emissary who brought the regalia to Urbino, Sir Gilbert Talbot, or to Henry himself—recent scholarship suggests the latter. The honour paid to a minor Italian ruler reflected Henry's appreciation of the cultural prestige of Renaissance Italy as much as any diplomatic purpose.

The traditional subject, Saint George and the Dragon, combining chivalry and Christianity, is appropriate for the occasion; like his father, Guidobaldo was a condottiero, or proprietor of a band of mercenary soldiers. In the early stages of his career Raphael painted a number of tiny cabinet paintings, including another St George in the Louvre, and the Vision of a Knight in the National Gallery in London.

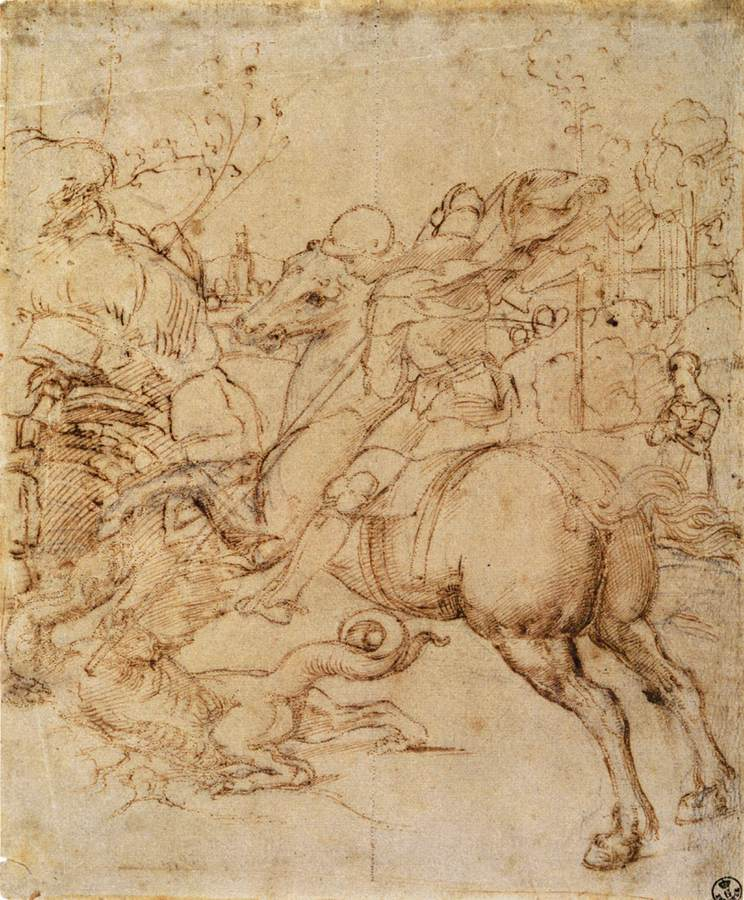
Pen-and-wash drawing for Saint George and the Dragon (Uffizi)

== Provenance ==
By 1627 the painting belonged to William Herbert, 3rd Earl of Pembroke (1580–1630), and was at Wilton House in Wiltshire. Either the 3rd or 4th earl presented it to King Charles I of England. After the English Civil War it was sold in one of the sales of the Royal Collection at Somerset House in London on 19 December 1651. Soon after it was in France. The painting was later a highlight of the Pierre Crozat collection which was acquired through Diderot's mediation by Catherine the Great of Russia in 1772. For a century and a half, the panel hung in the Imperial Hermitage Museum. It was one of the most popular paintings in the entire collection of the Tsars. In March 1931 it was part of the Soviet sale of Hermitage paintings, and bought by Andrew Mellon, as part of his founding donation to the National Gallery of Art in Washington D.C. This and other foundational artworks, including paintings by Jan van Eyck, Sandro Botticelli, and Titian, helped place the National Gallery among the most significant collections of Renaissance art.

== See also ==
- List of paintings by Raphael
- List of paintings in the National Gallery of Art formerly in the Hermitage Museum
