= The Finding of Moses (Veronese, Washington) =

Painting by Paolo Veronese

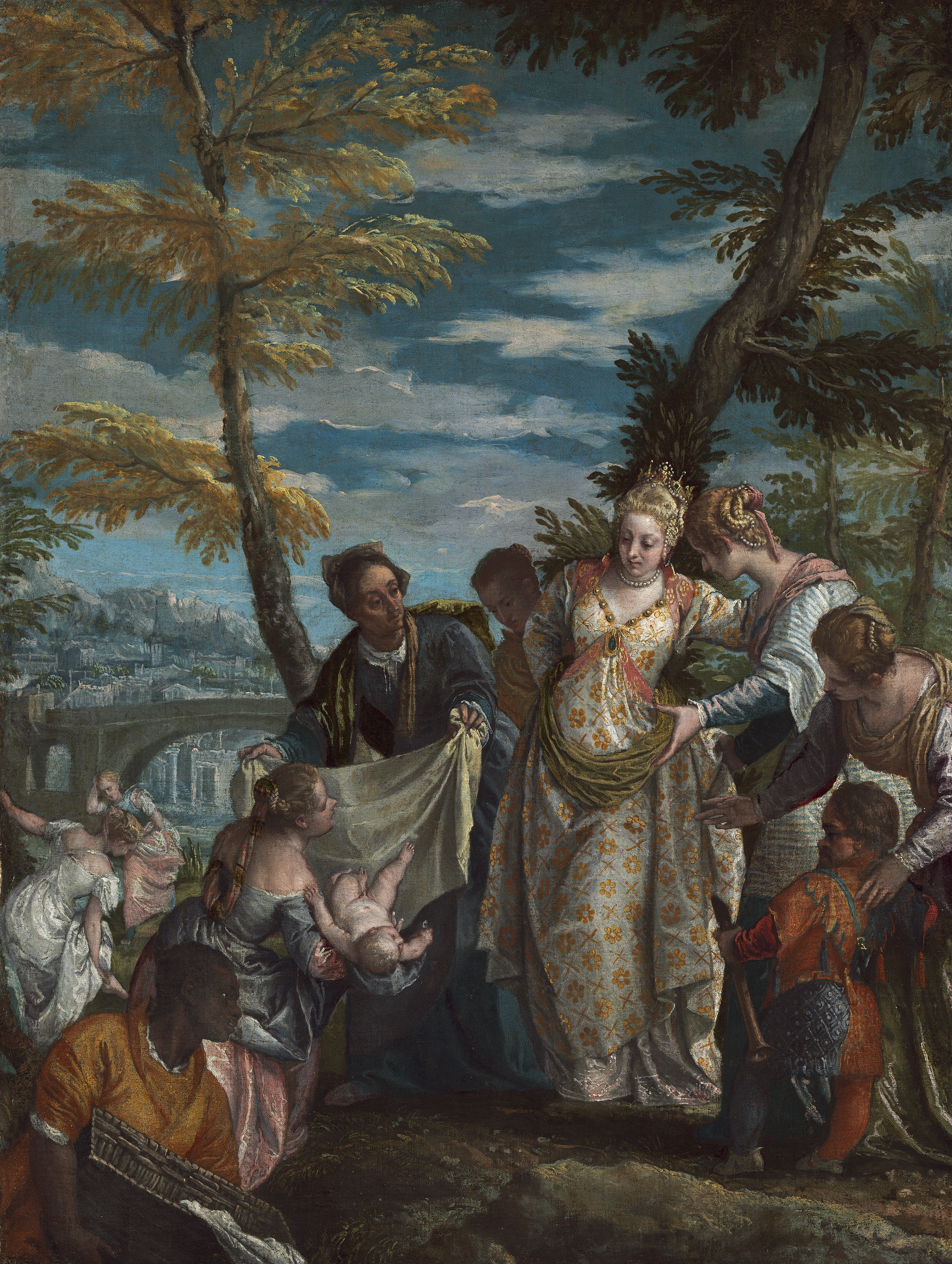
The Finding of Moses (c. 1581-1582) by Paolo Veronese

The Finding of Moses is an oil on canvas painting by Paolo Veronese, from c. 1581-1582. It is held in the National Gallery of Art, in Washington, D.C.

It was bought for Catherine the Great at the sale of Louis-Michel van Loo's collection in Paris on 14 December 1772 and remained in the Hermitage Museum until November 1930, when it was bought by Andrew Mellon via the Matthiesen Gallery in Berlin, P. & D. Colnaghi & Co. in London and M. Knoedler in New York during the Soviet sale of Hermitage paintings. Mellon transferred it to the A. W. Mellon Educational and Charitable Trust in 1937 and later that year the Trust donated it to its present owner.
