= Galitzin Triptych =

Triptych by Pietro Perugino

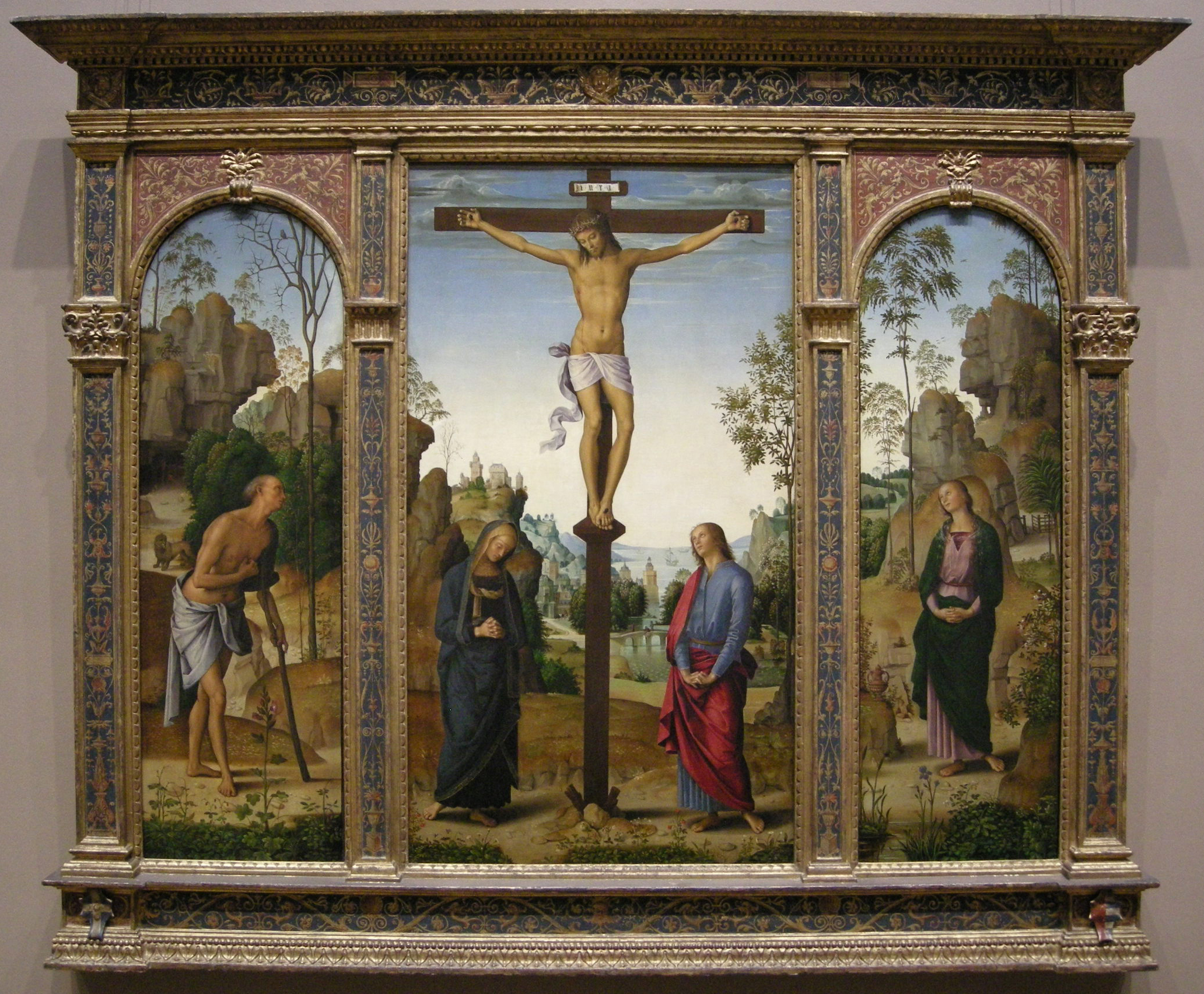
- Artist: Perugino
- Year: c.1485
- Medium: oil on panel, later transferred to canvas
- Dimensions: 101 cm × 116 cm (40 in × 46 in)
- Location: National Gallery of Art, Washington

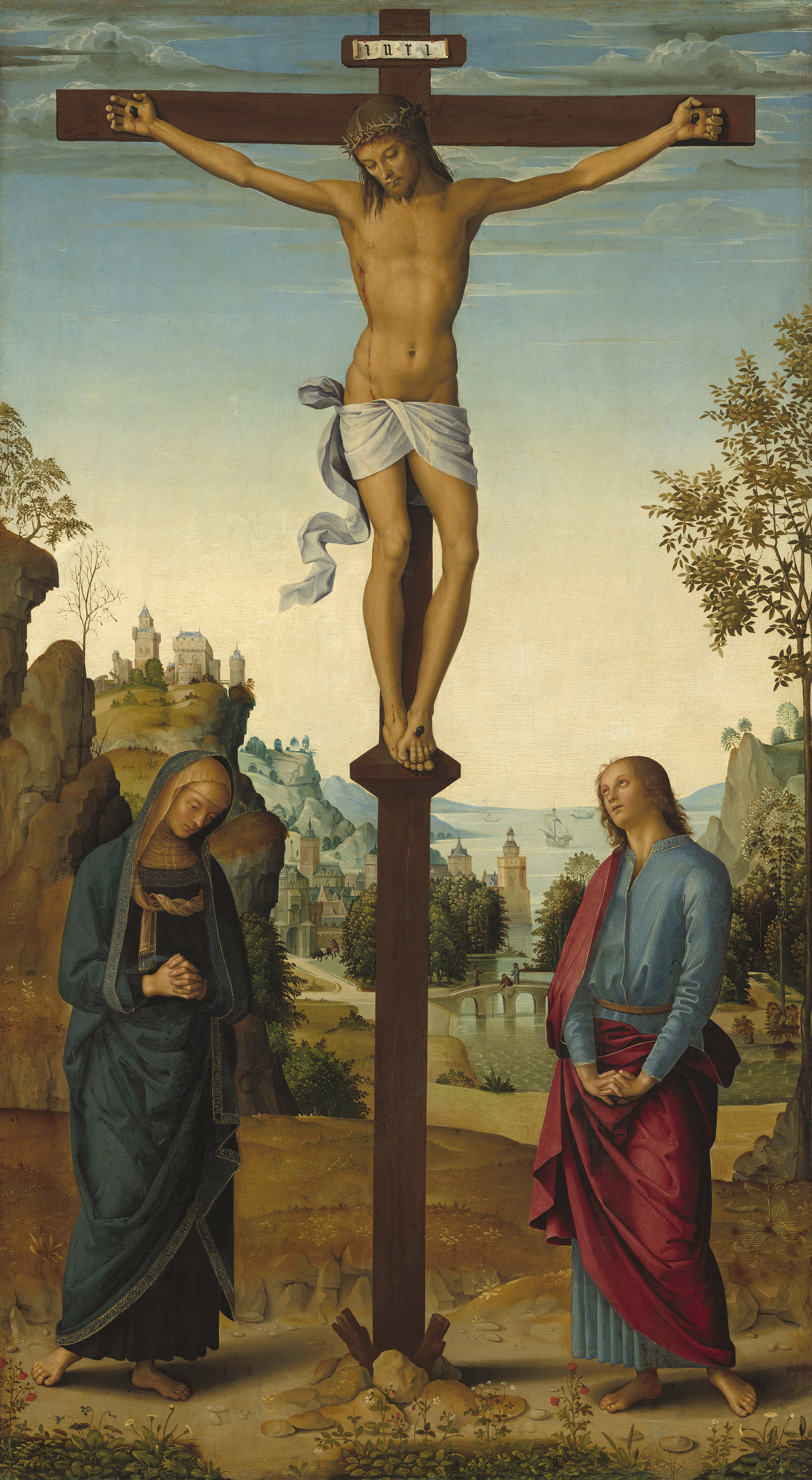
The central panel.

The Galitzin Triptych is a c.1485 painting by Perugino, now in the National Gallery of Art in Washington.

It was probably commissioned by Bartolommeo Bartoli, bishop of Cagli. It originated in a chapel of the Dominican monastic church of San Gimignano and when that was suppressed in 1796–97 it was confiscated by French troops. It was then sold to a certain 'Buzzi', who sold it as a work of Raphael to Prince Alexander Mikhailovich Galitzin, the Imperial Russian ambassador to Rome. His nephew Mikhailovich Galitzin moved it to Moscow where, in 1865, it was exhibited at the Galitzin Museum of Western Art. It was sold again in 1886 with the rest of the Galitzin collection, this time to the Hermitage Museum. In April 1931 it was one of the artworks sold by Stalin to Andrew Mellon, United States Secretary of the Treasury. In 1937 the Mellon collection formed the core of the new National Gallery of Art.

The central panel shows the Crucifixion of Christ with John the Apostle and the Virgin Mary. One side panel shows Jerome with his lion and the other shows Mary Magdalene in a contemplative pose identical to that of John.

== Bibliography (in Italian) ==
- Vittoria Garibaldi, Perugino, in Pittori del Rinascimento, Scala, Florence, 2004 ISBN 888117099X
- Pierluigi De Vecchi, Elda Cerchiari, I tempi dell'arte, volume 2, Bompiani, Milan, 1999 ISBN 88-451-7212-0
- Stefano Zuffi, Il Quattrocento, Electa, Milan, 2004 ISBN 8837023154
