= Nicolas Iljine =

Russian-French-German writer

Nicolas V. Iljine
- Nikolai V. Ilyin
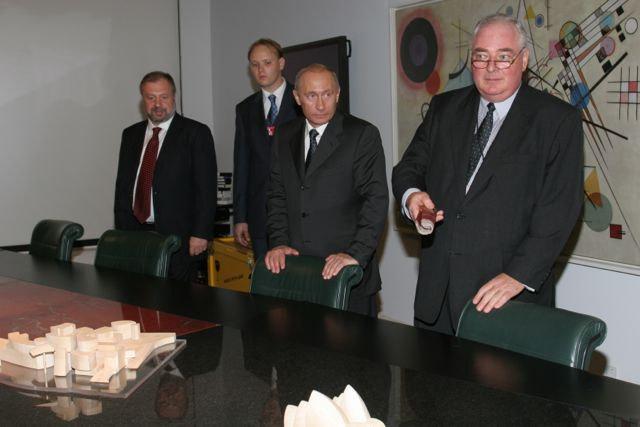
- Iljine (far right) with Vladimir Putin at the Guggenheim in 2005
- Born: September 10, 1944 (age 82)
- Citizenship: France, Russia, German
- Education: Sorbonne
- Occupations: Author, editor, executive, curator
- Spouse: Christa Iljine
- Children: 2
- Writing career
- Language: English, Russian, French, German
- Subjects: Russian and Western art
- Notable awards: Russian Order of Friendship

Nicolas Iljine (born September 10, 1944, Paris) is a German, French and Russian author, editor, curator, art consultant and best known as the advisor to the General Director of the Hermitage Museum. Among his publications are the 2003 book Odessa Memories, and he co-authored and edited Memories of Baku in 2013. Many of his books and exhibitions have involved the Russian and Western art of the 1920s-2010s, including the Soviet sale of Hermitage paintings. In 2006, Iljine was awarded the Russian Order of Friendship.

== Early life ==
Nicolas V. Iljine was born on September 10, 1944, the son of Russian immigrants. His father was Professor Vladimir Nikolayevich Iljine, a famous Russian Orthodox theologian and philosopher. His parents had fled Russia for their anti-Communist sentiments, and his father at one point had authored a book titled Communism: The Death of Culture. As a child Nick Iljine developed a keen interest in visiting Russia himself. He was educated in Great Britain and France, studied mathematics at the Sorbonne, and then specialized in public relations. He speaks fluent English, Russian, French, and German.

Iljine started his career in 1964 working at a travel agency. He first visited Russia in 1965, with a team of psychologists who were holding their World Congress in Moscow.

== Career ==
=== Business ===
Lufthansa, early exhibitions

From 1968 to 1994 Iljine worked at Lufthansa, the flagship airline company of Germany. He started in marketing and sales and in 1971 he moved to the public relations department, eventually serving as their general manager for public affairs. While working at Lufthansa Iljine began to study modern art, as his job acquainted him with artists, gallery owners, and museums.

As a member of the Friendship Society of the USSR-FRG in the 1970s-1980s, Iljine executed a number of cultural exchange programs and events. In 1976 he helped organize a film festival in Frankfurt, Berlin, and Munich, focusing on films made in Russia under the Soviet Union, such as the oft-censored Agony.

Starting in the early 1980s he began to gain experience with cultural exchange with Russia. He has stated that in 1988, "it occurred to me that we should show the world the Russian culture - what our country really is. And I came up with The Great Utopia - a retrospective of Russian avant-garde completely, inside and out, from 1913 to 1932." It led to his association with Thomas Krens, the future head of the Solomon R. Guggenheim Foundation. The Great Utopia was shown from 1991 until 1993 in Frankfurt am Main, Amsterdam, New York City and Moscow. Despite organizing the exhibit and numerous others, Iljine has stated he does not see himself as a curator, and he has no special education in the arts.

Guggenheim Foundation

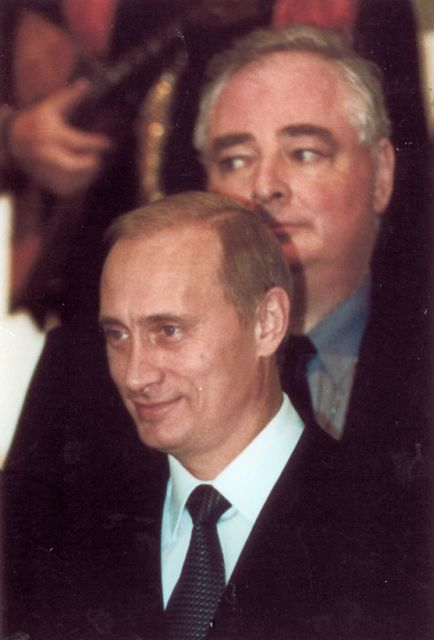
Putin and Iljine at the Guggenheim Museum in 2000

He worked as the European representative for the Solomon R. Guggenheim Foundation from 1994 to 2008, and in 2008 was also their representative in the Middle East. In this role he was instrumental in creating and implementing museum projects including Guggenheim Bilbao, Deutsche Guggenheim Berlin with Deutsche Bank, Guggenheim-Hermitage in Las Vegas, and the development of Guggenheim Abu Dhabi. He also curated architectural competitions for designing the Guggenheim museum in Lithuania and Mexico. While at the Guggenheim he organized major exhibitions such as RUSSIA!, a 2005 survey of Russian art at the Guggenheim in New York that was opened by Putin.

He has taken active part in organizing numerous other Russian art exhibitions, including Kazimir Malevich - Suprematism, Amazons of the Avant-Garde (opened in New York by President V.V. Putin) and Kazimir Malevich - Suprematism, and RUSSIA! Exhibition opened by V.V.Putin in September 2005. For three years during the Art Basel Miami fair, he organized an annual exhibition of Russian contemporary art.

Recent years

From 2008 to 2010 he worked for GCAM (Global Cultural Asset Management Group) in New York, headed by Thomas Krens. As VP for international development, Iljine dealt with museum construction, building art collections, management programming, and art investment. He worked jointly with French architect Jean Nouvel on the design for a project of a Museum of Contemporary Art in Baku.

As of February 2010, he was a consultant on issues such as "international cooperation" to several European cultural institutions. He is acting as Educational Activities Adviser at the M.T. Abraham Foundation, and since 2013 is heading the advisory board of the Hermitage Museum Foundation Israel.

=== Writing ===
Iljine has published, co-authored, and edited a number of novels in his career. Early on he contributed to eight illustrated publications for Lufthansa on flight myths and legends. He later worked on the 2008 book Nikolai Suetin, about the artist Nikolai Suetin.

==== Selling Russia's Treasures ====
In 2000, Iljine was an editor for the Russian-language anthology of essays titled Prodannye Sokrovishcha Rossii (Sold Treasures of Russia), a publication detailing of the sale of Russian art confiscated from the Tsarist royal family, the church, private individuals and museums in the Soviet Union. About the topic matter, Iljne has stated "[The sale] was ludicrous. They sold all these treasures to buy tractors but it made almost no difference to the state's budget." According to The Daily Telegraph in 2000, Russia's culture minister, Mikhail Shvydkoi, used the book's launch as a platform to accuse modern communists of hypocrisy, stating "Those politicians who see themselves as descendants of the party which sold these treasures abroad are especially jealous of the title of defenders of the national inheritance. This book destroys that myth."

In The Hedonist's Guide to Art, a 2010 collection of essays by critics, curators, collectors and critics, Iljine outlines such incidents as Putin opening a show for the Guggenheim in 2005. In 2013, Iljine was a project director and co-editor for the book Selling Russia's Treasures, published by the M.T. Abraham Foundation Press. The anthology is composed primarily of translated essays first published in Sold Treasures of Russia, with the addition of material such as archival photos.

==== Odessa Memories (2003) ====
In 2003 Iljine edited and co-authored the book Odessa Memories. Published by the University of Washington Press, it has contributions by writers such as Iljine, German novelist Bel Kaufman, author Oleg Gubar, and American historian Patricia Herlihy. Iljine, who had first visited Odessa in 1995, collected the visual material. According to a 2007 review in the Jewish Quarterly Review, "Odessa Memories is an attractive collection of scholarly, memoiristic, and visual perspectives on Odessa built around a rich album of visual material from the city, particularly in its last pre-Revolutionary years: post-cards, posters, advertisements, photographs, even candy-wrappers."

In early 2013, Iljine collected songs and lyrics for the album Odessa Memories, which has stair imagery from Battleship Potemkin on the cover. First published by the University of Washington Press, it was later translated for the Russian publishing house Shamrock, a company known mostly for publishing art books.

==== Memories of Baku (2013) ====
In 2013 Iljine edited and co-authored the book Memories of Baku: Beyond the Land of Fire, which uses a collection of photographs, art and essays to show the changes in Azerbaijan as it became a large oil-producing nation, particularly in the capital city of Baku. Iljine had first started the project after obtaining a postcard collection from Baku, and his interest had turned into a "passion for discovering local impressions from further afield in Azerbaijan." He traveled to the country eighteen times for the project, focusing his research on the formative period leading up to the 1920s. He collected hundreds of old postcards from local people and stores, and found authors familiar with the old city's architecture and music to contribute. He also added material from archives such as the Public Library in St. Petersburg.

The book was published in 2013 by Marquand Books in Seattle, and partly sponsored by Ulvi Kasimov, CEO of the investment company SFERIQ. Fakhraddin Gurbanov, the Ambassador of Azerbaijan, also contributed to the book's publication, and spoke at the September 2013 book launch event in London.

"Memories of Baku represents a true and vivid illustration of Azerbaijan and its evolution over a critical time in our country's history. This book beautifully illustrates our country's past and how Azerbaijan arrived at the present; it is a book to learn from, and to cherish." - Ambassador of Azerbaijan, (2013)

Other hosts at the event included the Britain Azerbaijan Business Council and Asia House. Beyond English, it was also released in Russian. in 2018 he published Memories of Tiflis.

=== Memberships, awards ===
In September 2006, Iljine was awarded the Order of Friendship, on order signed by President Vladimir Putin. He is a founding member of the Board of Trustees of the Kandinsky Prize, and is an honorary member of the Russian Academy of Arts. He has received honors in Venice, as documented by Artnet.com. He is also a member of the Paris Council of Emperor Alexander III for developing cultural and political ties between Russia and France. As of 2014 he is on the board for the Society of Historians of East European, Eurasian, and Russian Art and Architecture.

== Personal life ==
Iljine has been married to his wife Christa since 1964, and together they have two grown children and two granddaughter. A citizen of both France and Russia, since the early 1970s he has lived in the German city of Frankfurt, where he resided as of 2013.

== Publishing history ==
Selected publications as co-author, editor, or publisher
Year	Title	Publisher	ISBN	Role
2000	Sold Treasures of Russia	Trilistnik, Moscow	ISBN 5894800277	editor
2004	Odessa Memories	University of Washington Press, Seattle	ISBN 978-0295983455	editor, co-author
2008	Pass to Paradise	Vagrius, Moscow		
2008	Nikolai Suetin	Palace Editions, St. Petersburg	ISBN 978-3940761002	editor
2009	Fire of Worlds by Vladimir Iljine	Progress-Traditsia, Moscow		editor
2013	Memories of Baku	Marquand Books, Seattle	ISBN 978-0988227514	editor, co-author
2013	Selling Russia's Treasures	M.T. Abraham Foundation, Paris	ISBN 978-0789211545	co-editor
2018	Big Nic - Volume 1 (English)	LAS Press, New York	ISBN 978-1387536580	co-author
2018	Big Nic - Volume 1 (Russian)	LAS Press, New York	ISBN 978-1387590667	co-author
2018	Big Nic - Volume 2 (Russian)	LAS Press, New York	ISBN 978-1387590698	co-author
2018	Big Nic - Volume 3 (Russian)	LAS Press, New York	ISBN 978-1387539512	co-author

== Exhibits ==
- 1991–1993: The Great Utopia
- 1993: Chagall's Jewish Theater
- 1999: Amazons of the Avant-Garde
- 2003: Kazimir Malevich - Suprematism
- 2005: Russia!
