= List of heads of government of Armenia =

Armenian government list

This is a list of heads of government of Armenia from the establishment of the office in 1918 to the present day.

== First Republic of Armenia (1918–1920) ==
=== Prime Minister of Armenia ===
No.	Portrait	Name (Birth–Death)	Term of office		Political party
No.	Portrait	Name (Birth–Death)	Took office	Left office	Political party
1		Hovhannes Kajaznuni (1868–1938)	30 June 1918	28 May 1919	ARF
2		Alexander Khatisian (1874–1945)	28 May 1919	5 May 1920	ARF
3		Hamo Ohanjanyan (1873–1947)	5 May 1920	25 November 1920	ARF
4		Simon Vratsian (1882–1969)	25 November 1920	2 December 1920	ARF
Armenia was part of the Soviet Union from 1920 to 1991 (see below)

== Armenian Soviet Socialist Republic (1920–1991) ==
=== Chairmen of the Council of People's Commissars and the Council of Ministers of the Armenian Soviet Socialist Republic ===
Note: (Note: Part of the Transcaucasian Socialist Federative Soviet Republic (1922–1936) and the Soviet Union (1922–1991))

No.	Portrait	Name (Birth–Death)	Term of office		Political party	Title(s)
No.	Portrait	Name (Birth–Death)	Took office	Left office	Political party	Title(s)
1		Alexander Miasnikian (1886–1925)	1 January 1921	30 January 1922	HKK	Chairman of the Council of People's Commissars
2		Sargis Lukashin (1883–1937)	21 May 1922	24 June 1925	HKK	Chairman of the Council of People's Commissars
3		Sargis Hambardzumyan (1870–1944)	24 June 1925	22 March 1928	HKK	Chairman of the Council of People's Commissars
4		Sahak Ter-Gabrielyan (1886–1937)	22 March 1928	10 February 1935	HKK	Chairman of the Council of People's Commissars
5		Abraham Guloyan (1893–1938)	10 February 1935	February 1937	HKK	Chairman of the Council of People's Commissars
6		Sargis Hambardzumyan (1870–1944)	February 1937	May 1937	HKK	Chairman of the Council of People's Commissars
7		Stepan Akopyan (1878–1961)	May 1937	21 September 1937	HKK	Chairman of the Council of People's Commissars
8		Aram Piruzyan (1907–1996)	23 November 1937	October 1943	HKK	Chairman of the Council of People's Commissars
9		Aghasi Sargsyan (1905–1971)	October 1943	1946	HKK	Chairman of the Council of People's Commissars
9		Aghasi Sargsyan (1905–1971)	1946	29 March 1947	HKK	Chairmen of the Council of Ministers
10		Sahak Karapetyan (1906–1987)	29 March 1947	20 November 1952	HKK	Chairmen of the Council of Ministers
11		Anton Kochinyan (1913–1990)	20 November 1952	5 February 1966	HKK	Chairmen of the Council of Ministers
12		Badal Muradyan (1915–1991)	5 February 1966	21 November 1973	HKK	Chairmen of the Council of Ministers
13		Grigory Arzumanyan (1918–1976)	21 November 1973	28 November 1976	HKK	Chairmen of the Council of Ministers
—		G.A. Martirosyan (1934–2015)	28 November 1976	17 January 1977	HKK	Chairmen of the Council of Ministers
14		Fadey Sargsyan (1923–2010)	17 January 1977	16 January 1989	HKK	Chairmen of the Council of Ministers
15		Vladimir Markaryants (1934–2000)	16 January 1989	13 August 1990	HKK	Chairmen of the Council of Ministers
16		Vazgen Manukyan (born 1946)	13 August 1990	25 September 1991	AZhM	Chairmen of the Council of Ministers

== Armenia (1991–present) ==
=== Prime Minister of Armenia ===
NDU (1) PANM (1) RPA (7) Civil Contract (1)
No.	Name (Birth–Death)	Portrait	Political party	Term of office		Election (Parliament)	Government	
No.	Name (Birth–Death)	Portrait	Political party	Term of office		Election (Parliament)	No.	Composition
1	Vazgen Manukyan (born 1946)		PANM	13 August 1990	25 September 1991 (Independence)	1990	1st	Independents • PANM
	Vazgen Manukyan (born 1946)		NDU	25 September 1991 (Independence)	22 November 1991	1990	1st	Independents • PANM • NDU
2	Gagik Harutyunyan (born 1948)		Independent	22 November 1991	30 July 1992	1990	2nd	Independents • PANM
3	Khosrov Harutyunyan (born 1948)		Independent	30 July 1992	2 February 1993	1990	3rd	Independents • PANM
4	Hrant Bagratyan (born 1958)		PANM	2 February 1993	26 July 1995	1990	4th	Independents • PANM
4	Hrant Bagratyan (born 1958)		PANM	26 July 1995	4 November 1996	1995	5th	PANM • RPA
5	Armen Sarkissian (born 1952)		Independent	4 November 1996	20 March 1997	1995	6th	PANM • RPA
6	Robert Kocharyan (born 1954)		Independent	20 March 1997	10 April 1998	1995	7th	RPA • ARF
7	Armen Darbinyan (born 1964)		Independent	10 April 1998	11 June 1999	1995	8th	RPA • ARF • ACP
8	Vazgen Sargsyan (1959–1999)		RPA	11 June 1999	27 October 1999	1999	9th	RPA • PPA • ARF
9	Aram Sargsyan (born 1961)		RPA	3 November 1999	2 May 2000	1999	10th	RPA • PPA • ARF
10	Andranik Margaryan (1951–2007)		RPA	2 May 2000	25 May 2003	1999	11th	RPA • PPA • ARF • Heritage
10	Andranik Margaryan (1951–2007)		RPA	25 May 2003	25 March 2007 (Died in office)	2003	12th	RPA • ARF • Heritage
—	Serzh Sargsyan (born 1954)		RPA	25 March 2007	4 April 2007	2003	12th	RPA • ARF • Heritage
11	Serzh Sargsyan (born 1954)		RPA	4 April 2007	7 April 2008	2003	13th	RPA • ARF • Heritage
12	Tigran Sargsyan (born 1960)		RPA	9 April 2008	6 May 2012	2007	14th	RPA • ARF • OEK • PAP
12	Tigran Sargsyan (born 1960)		RPA	6 May 2012	19 April 2013	2012	15th	RPA • OEK
12	Tigran Sargsyan (born 1960)		RPA	19 April 2013	13 April 2014	2012	16th	RPA • OEK
13	Hovik Abrahamyan (born 1959)		RPA	13 April 2014	8 September 2016	2012	17th	RPA • OEK • ARF
14	Karen Karapetyan (born 1963)		RPA	13 September 2016	18 May 2017	2012	18th	RPA • ARF
14	Karen Karapetyan (born 1963)		RPA	18 May 2017	17 April 2018	2017	19th	RPA • ARF
15	Serzh Sargsyan (born 1954)		RPA	17 April 2018	23 April 2018	2017	20th	RPA • ARF
—	Karen Karapetyan (born 1963)		RPA	23 April 2018	8 May 2018	2017	20th	RPA • ARF
16	Nikol Pashinyan (born 1975)		Civil Contract (Yelk / My Step)	8 May 2018	14 January 2019	2017	21st	Yelk • Tsarukyan Alliance • ARF
16	Nikol Pashinyan (born 1975)		Civil Contract (Yelk / My Step)	14 January 2019	2 August 2021	2018	22nd	Civil Contract • Mission • Hanrapetutyun
16	Nikol Pashinyan (born 1975)		Civil Contract (Yelk / My Step)	2 August 2021	Incumbent	2021	23rd	Civil Contract

== Timeline ==
This is a graphical lifespan timeline of the heads of government of Armenia. They are listed in order of first assuming office.

The following chart lists heads of government by lifespan (living heads of government on the green line), with the years outside of their tenure in beige.

The following chart shows heads of government by their age (living heads of government in green), with the years of their tenure in blue. The vertical black line at 25 years indicates the minimum age to be prime minister.

== See also ==
- Prime Minister of Armenia
- President of Armenia
- List of leaders of Armenia
