= Deputy Prime Minister of Armenia =

Deputy head of government of Armenia

Deputy Prime Minister of Armenia Հայաստանի փոխվարչապետ
- Coat of arms of Armenia
- Incumbent; Mher Grigoryan and Tigran Khachatryan since 11 May 2018 and 19 December 2022
- Member of: Cabinet of Armenia
- Residence: Government House
- Seat: Yerevan
- Appointer: President of Armenia, based on Prime Minister's proposal
- Inaugural holder: Karen Karapetyan, Vache Gabrielyan and Armen Gevorgyan
- Website: www.gov.am

The Deputy Prime Minister of Armenia (Armenian: Հայաստանի փոխվարչապետ, romanized: Hayastani p’vokhvarch’apet) is the official deputy of the head of government of Armenia, the Prime Minister. According to the Constitution of Armenia, the number of Deputy Prime Ministers can be up to three. The current Deputy Prime Ministers are Mher Grigoryan and Tigran Khachatryan.

== List of deputy prime ministers of Armenia ==
Image	Name	Term of office		Political party	Prime Minister
	Hovik Abrahamyan	June 8, 2007	April 21, 2008	Republican Party of Armenia	Serzh Sargsyan (Sargsyan I)
	Armen Gevorgyan	April 21, 2008	October 17, 2014	Republican Party of Armenia	Tigran Sargsyan (Sargsyan)
	Vache Gabrielyan	28 November 2014	17 April 2018	Republican Party of Armenia	Abrahamyan government (Abrahamyan)
	Vache Gabrielyan	28 November 2014	17 April 2018	Republican Party of Armenia	Karen Karapetyan (Karapetyan)
Entry into force of new constitution
	Vache Gabrielyan	17 April 2018	23 April 2018	Republican Party of Armenia	Serzh Sargsyan (Sargsyan II)
	Armen Gevorgyan	17 April 2018	23 April 2018	Republican Party of Armenia	Serzh Sargsyan (Sargsyan II)
	Tigran Avinyan	11 May 2018	2 August 2021	Civil Contract	Nikol Pashinyan (Pashinyan I Pashinyan II; Pashinyan III)
	Mher Grigoryan	11 May 2018	Incumbent	Independent	Nikol Pashinyan (Pashinyan I Pashinyan II; Pashinyan III)
	Tigran Khachatryan	19 December 2022	Incumbent	Independent	Nikol Pashinyan (Pashinyan I Pashinyan II; Pashinyan III)
	Suren Papikyan	August 2, 2021	November 25, 2021	Civil Contract	Nikol Pashinyan (Pashinyan I Pashinyan II; Pashinyan III)
	Hambardzum Matevosyan	November 25, 2021	December 12, 2022	Civil Contract	Nikol Pashinyan (Pashinyan I Pashinyan II; Pashinyan III)

== First Deputy Prime Minister ==
As a result of the 2015 constitutional reforms, the position of First Deputy Prime Minister was established, who was supposed to replace the Prime Minister in the latter's absence.

=== List of first deputy prime ministers of Armenia ===
Image	Name	Term of office		Political party	Prime Minister
	Karen Karapetyan	17 April 2018	11 May 2018	Republican Party of Armenia	Serzh Sargsyan (Sargsyan II)
	Ararat Mirzoyan	11 May 2018	12 January 2019	Civil Contract	Nikol Pashinyan (Pashinyan I and Pashinyan II)

== See also ==
- Government of Armenia
- Prime Minister of Armenia
