= Second Serzh Sargsyan government =

Government of Armenia

Second Government of Serzh Sargsyan
- 15th government of Armenia

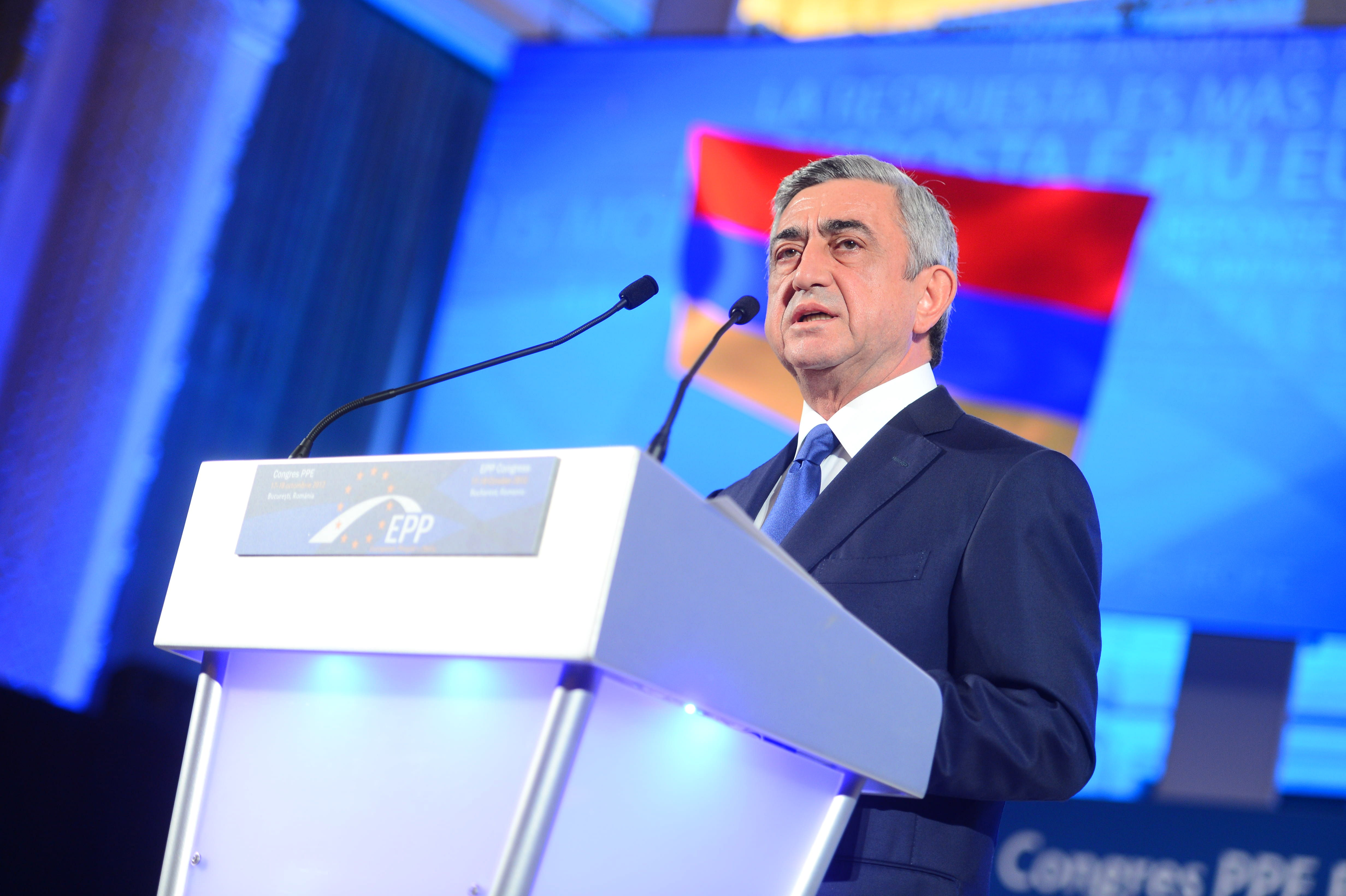
- Serzh Sargsyan (2012)
- Date formed: 17 April 2018
- Date dissolved: 23 April 2018

People and organisations
- Head of state: Armen Sarkissian
- Head of government: Serzh Sargsyan
- Deputy head of government: Karen Karapetyan
- No. of ministers: 18
- Member parties: Republican Party; ARF
- Status in legislature: Coalition
- Opposition parties: Tsarukyan Alliance; Way Out Alliance

History
- Predecessor: Karapetyan government
- Successor: First Pashinyan government

The Second Serzh Sargsyan government was the governing body of Armenia from 17 April 2018 until 23 April 2018. Serzh Sargsyan was elected by National Assembly and was appointed Prime Minister by President Armen Sarkissian on 17 April 2018.

It was a coalition government formed by two parliamentary groups: the Republicans and Dashnaktsutyun.

The cabinet consisted of eighteen ministries and eight adjunct bodies. Each ministry is responsible for elaborating and implementing governmental decisions in its respective sphere.

Sezh Sargsyan was forced to resign after few days of mass protests within the frames of the 2018 Armenian revolution.

== Structure ==
=== Governing staff ===
Main office holders
| Office | Name | Party | Since |
|---|---|---|---|
| Prime Minister | Serzh Sargsyan | Republican Party | 17 April 2018 |
| First Deputy Prime Minister | Karen Karapetyan | Republican Party | 17 April 2018 |
| Deputy Prime Minister | Vache Gabrielyan | Republican Party | 17 April 2018 |
| Deputy Prime Minister | Armen Gevorgyan | Republican Party | 17 April 2018 |

=== Ministries ===
Main office holders
| Office | Name | Party | Since |
|---|---|---|---|
| Prime Minister of Armenia | Karen Karapetyan | Republican Party | 17 April 2018 |
| Vice Prime Minister Minister of International Economic Integration and Reforms | Vache Gabrielyan | Republican Party | 17 April 2018 |
| Minister of Defence | Vigen Sargsyan | Republican Party | 17 April 2018 |
| Minister of Economic Development and Investments | Suren Karayan | Republican Party | 17 April 2018 |
| Minister of Agriculture | Ignati Arakelyan | Republican Party | 17 April 2018 |
| Minister of Culture | Armen Amiryan | Republican Party | 17 April 2018 |
| Minister of Diaspora | Hranush Hakobyan | Republican Party | 17 April 2018 |
| Minister of Nature Protection | Artsvik Minasyan | Armenian Revolutionary Federation | 17 April 2018 |
| Minister of Education and Science | Levon Mkrtchyan | Armenian Revolutionary Federation | 17 April 2018 |
| Minister of Energy Infrastructures and Natural Resources | Ashot Manukyan | Non-partisan | 17 April 2018 |
| Minister of Finance | Vardan Aramyan | Republican Party | 17 April 2018 |
| Minister of Foreign Affairs | Eduard Nalbandyan | Non-partisan | 17 April 2018 |
| Minister of Health | Levon Altunyan | Republican Party | 17 April 2018 |
| Minister of Justice | Davit Harutyunyan | Republican Party | 17 April 2018 |
| Minister of Labor and Social Affairs | Artem Asatryan | Republican Party | 17 April 2018 |
| Minister of Sport and Youth Affairs | Hrachya Rostomyan | Non-partisan | 17 April 2018 |
| Minister of Territorial Administration and Development | Davit Lokyan | Armenian Revolutionary Federation | 17 April 2018 |
| Minister of Emergency Situations | Davit Tonoyan | Non-partisan | 17 April 2018 |
| Minister of Transport, Communication and Information Technologies | Vahan Martirosyan | Republican Party | 17 April 2018 |

=== Adjunct bodies ===
The role of adjunct bodies is to elaborate, implement and administer governmental decision in respective sphere. Similar to ministries, adjunct bodies are subordinate to Prime Minister. There are eight adjunct bodies to Armenian government.

| Adjunct body | Head | Party | Since in office |
|---|---|---|---|
| General Department of Civil Aviation | Sergey Avetisyan | Non-party | 8 June 2016 |
| National Security Service | Georgy Kutoyan | Non-party | 12 February 2016 |
| State Nuclear Safety Regulatory Committee by the Government | Ashot Martirosyan | Non-party | 17 September 2008 |
| Police | Vladimir Gasparyan | Non-party | 1 November 2011 |
| State Committee of the Real Estate Cadastre | Martin Sargsyan | Republican Party | 3 June 2014 |
| State Property Management Department | Arman Sahakyan | Republican Party | 22 June 2011 |
| State Revenue Committee | Vardan Harutyunyan | Non-party | 8 October 2016 |
| State Urban Development Committee | Narek Sargsyan | Non-party | 11 October 2016 |
