= Tigran Sargsyan government =

Government of Armenia

Government of Tigran Sargsian
- 12th government of Armenia

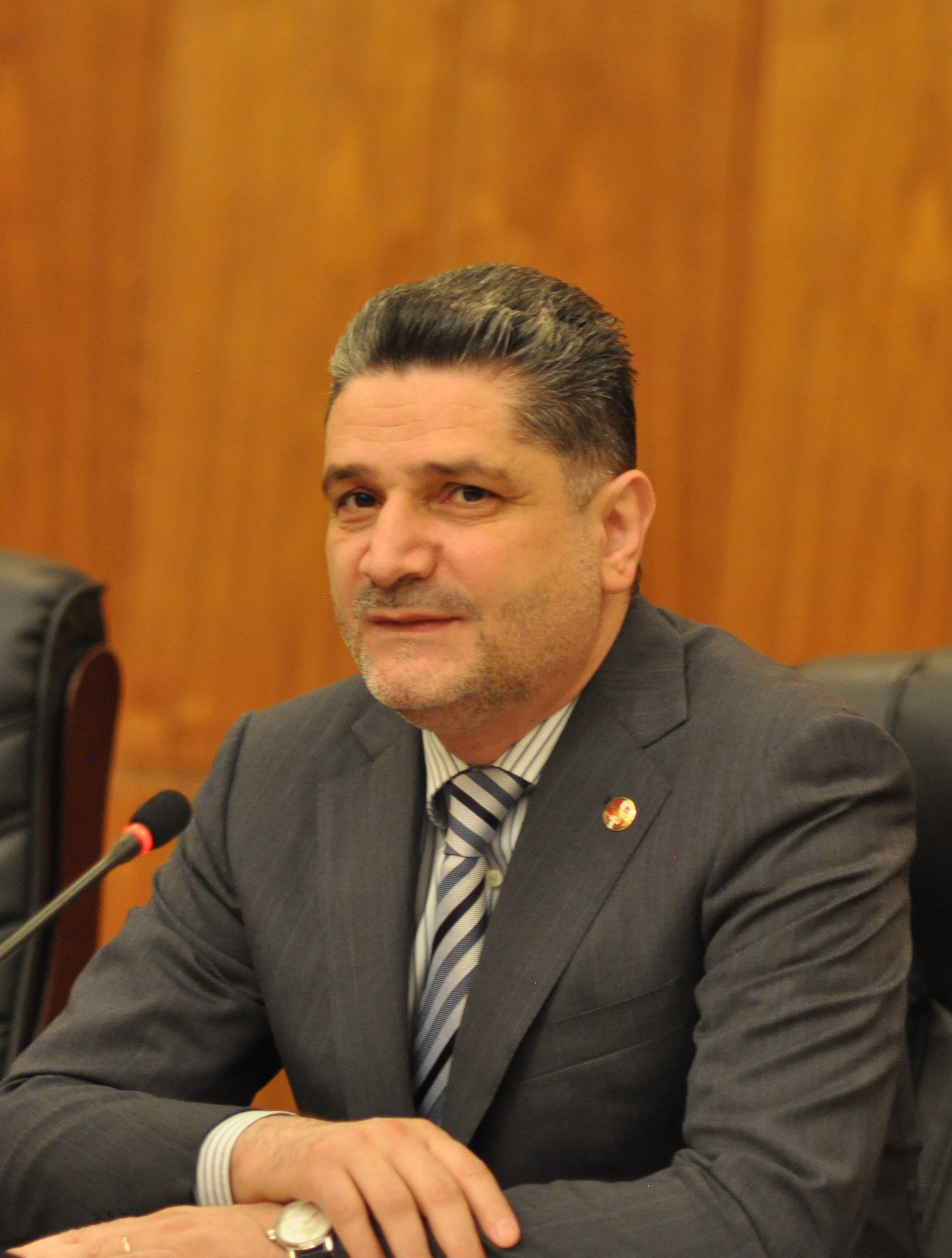
- Date formed: April 2008
- Date dissolved: April 2014

People and organisations
- Head of state: Serzh Sargsyan
- Head of government: Tigran Sargsyan
- No. of ministers: 18
- Member parties: Republican Party; Prosperous Armenia; Rule of Law Party; ARF
- Status in legislature: Coalition
- Opposition parties: ANC; Heritage

History
- Predecessor: First Serzh Sargsyan government
- Successor: Abrahamyan government

Tigran Sargsian's government was the governing body of Armenia from April 2008 to April 2014. Tigran Sargsyan was designated Prime Minister by President Serzh Sargsyan in April 2008.

It was a coalition government formed by Republican Party, Prosperous Armenia, Rule of Law party and ARF.

The cabinet consisted of eighteen ministries and eight adjunct bodies. Each ministry is responsible for elaborating and implementing governmental decisions in its respective sphere.

== Structure ==
=== Ministries ===
Main office-holders
Office	Name	Party	Since
Prime Minister	Tigran Sargsyan	Republican Party	9 April 2008
Minister of Defense	Seyran Ohanyan	Independent	14 April 2008
Chief of the staff of the Government	David Sargsyan	Republican Party	22 April 2008
Minister of Healthcare	Harutyun Kushkyan	Prosperous Armenia	1 June 2007
Minister of Economy	Tigran Davtyan	Republican Party	December 2010
Minister of Education and Science	Armen Ashotyan	Republican Party	13 May 2009
Minister of Foreign Affairs	Eduard Nalbandyan	Independent	15 April 2008
Minister of Nature Protection	Aram Harutyunyan	Republican Party	1 June 2007
Minister of Emergency Situations	Mher Shahgeldyan	Rule of Law	1 April 2008
Minister of Culture	Hasmik Poghosyan	Independent	1 June 2007
Minister of Agriculture	Sergo Karapetyan	Rule of Law	31 December 2010
Minister of Energy and Natural Resources	Armen Movsisyan	Republican Party	8 June 2007
Minister of Transport and Communications	Gurgen Sargsyan	Rule of Law Party	21 April 2008
Minister of Finance	Vache Gabrielyan	Republican Party	December 2010
Minister of Territorial Administration	Armen Gevorgyan	Independent	21 April 2008
Minister of Urban Development	Vardan Vardanyan	Prosperous Armenia	1 April 2008
Minister of Justice	Gevorg Danielyan	Republican Party	20 June 2007
Minister of Diaspora	Hranush Hacobyan	Republican Party	1 October 2008
Minister of Labor and Social Affairs	Mkhitar Mnatsakanyan	Prosperous Armenia	23 November 2009
Minister of Sport and Youth Affairs	Hrachya Rostomyan	Independent	16 June 2012
