= Government of Armenia =

National government

- Armenian: Հայաստանի Կառավարություն
- Coat of arms

Overview
- Country: Armenia
- Leader: Prime Minister
- Leader Name: Nikol Pashinyan
- Appointed by: President
- Main organ: Cabinet of Armenia
- Responsible to: National Assembly
- Headquarters: Government House Number 1 Yerevan, Armenia
- Website: gov.am

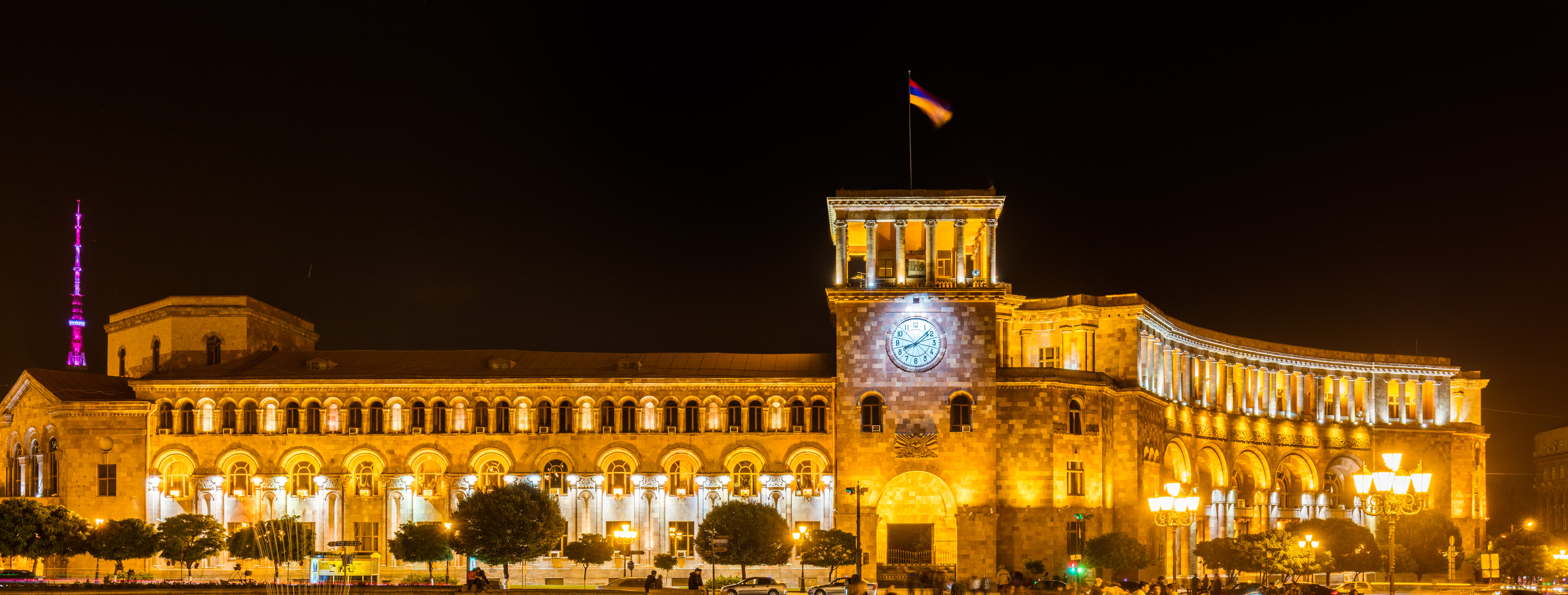
The Government House in Yerevan at the Republic Square, housing the Prime Minister's office

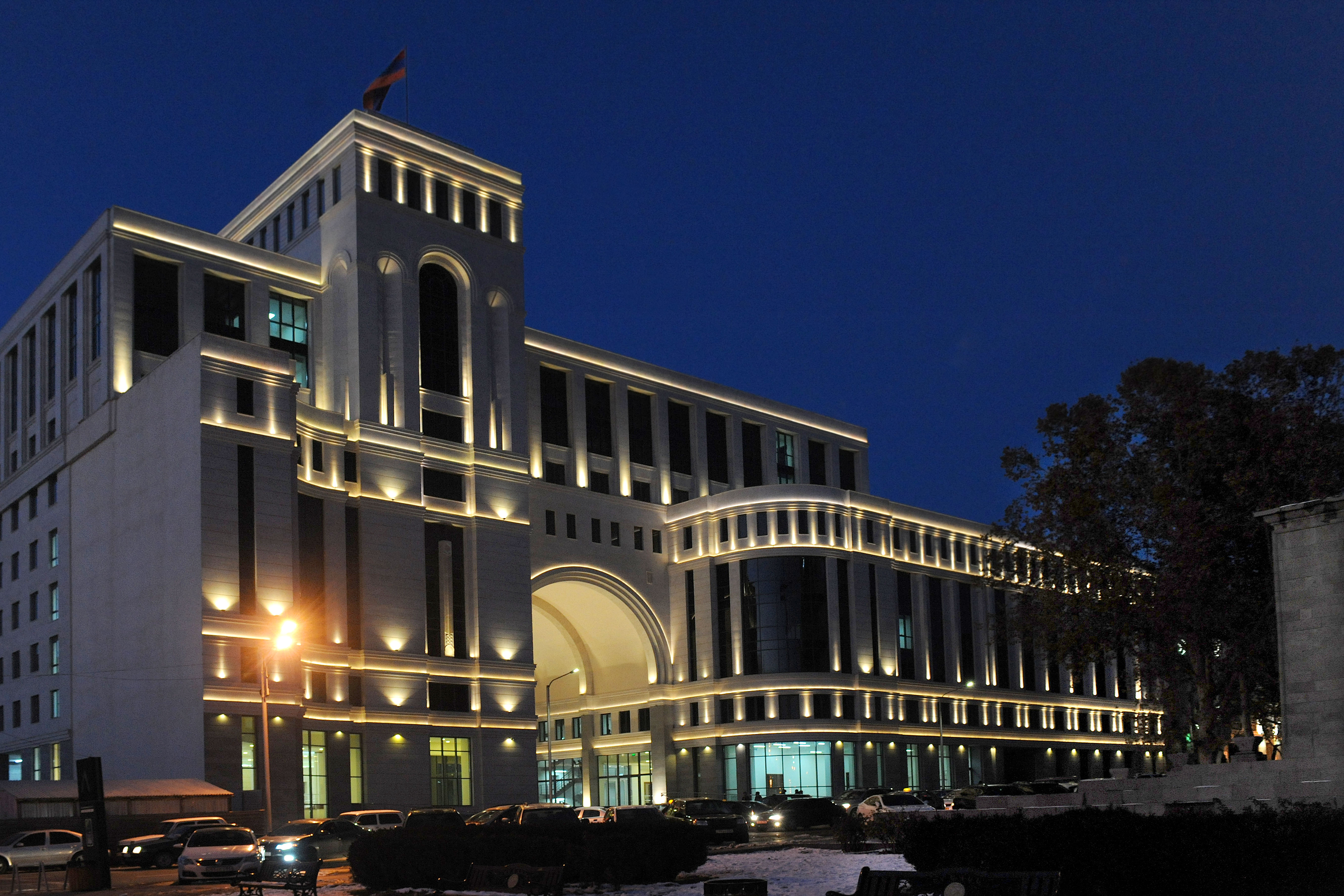
New government building housing several ministries

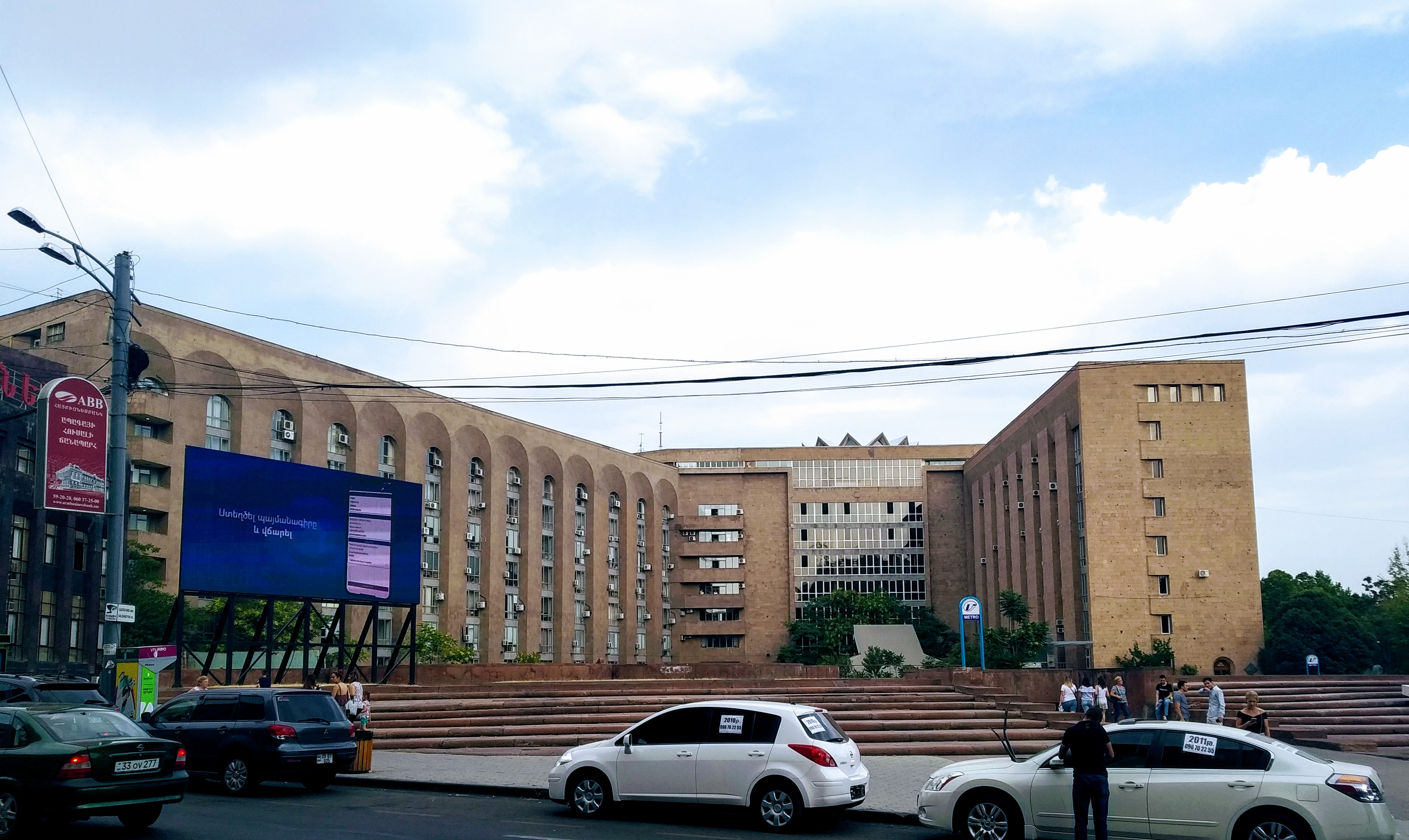
Government building no.3 housing several ministries

The Government of Armenia (Armenian: Հայաստանի Կառավարություն) or the executive branch of the Armenian government is an executive council of government ministers in Armenia. It is one of the three main governmental branches of Armenia and is headed by the Prime Minister of Armenia.

== Current government ==
The incumbent government of Armenia is led by Prime Minister Nikol Pashinyan who, as leader of Civil Contract (the party which won elections in December 2018), was appointed prime minister on 14 January 2019 by President Armen Sarkissian.

== Powers ==
=== Powers of Government granted by former revision of Constitution (accepted in 2005) ===
==== Resignation of the Government and its formation ====
Following the Article 55 of Armenian Constitution, the Republic's president must accept resignation of the government on the day of

1. first sitting of newly elected Nation Assembly
2. assumption of the office by the president of the Republic
3. expression of the vote of no confidence to the Government
4. resignation of the prime minister
5. vacant position of prime minister

Later on the prime minister must be appointed by the president of the Republic. The elected prime minister should enjoy the confidence of majority Deputies and if this is impossible the confidence of maximum number of the deputies. Ministers must be appointed within 20 days after prime minister is appointed. After these the Government is considered to be formed. All the ministers, including the prime minister, must be citizens of the Republic of Armenia. The structure of the Government must be defined by law in regard to recommendation by the Government. The procedure for the organization of operations of the Government and other public administration bodies under the Government must be defined by the decree of the president upon the submission of prime minister.

The role of the Prime Minister is that it should supervise the Government activities, coordinate the work of the Ministers and it should adopt decisions on the organization of Government activities. In addition, decisions passed by the Government must be signed by the Prime Minister. The president has the right to suspend Governmental decisions for one month for checking the compliance of decisions with the constitution. Government decisions about appointment or dissolution of the governors must be approved by the President.

The president has a right to invite and head government sittings about issues of defence, foreign policy or national security.

==== The mission of government ====
According to article 85 of the Armenian constitution, the government shall develop and implement the domestic policy and it should implement foreign policy of the Republic of Armenia jointly with the President of the Republic of Armenia.

By virtue of the constitution, the international treaties, the laws of the Republic of Armenia, or the decrees of the President of the Republic and to ensure the implementation thereof the government shall adopt decisions, which shall be subject to observance in the whole territory of the Republic"

==== Responsibilities of the government ====
As it is defined in the Article 89 of the Constitution of Armenia the government shall:

1) submit its program to the National Assembly for approval in accordance with Article 74 of the Constitution; 2) submit the draft state budget to the National Assembly for approval, ensure the execution of the budget and submit financial reports on the budget execution to the National Assembly; 3) manage the state property; 4) implement unified state policies in the areas of finances, economy, taxation, loans and credits; 4.1) implement the state territorial development policy. 5) implement state policies in the areas of science, education, culture, health, social security and environmental protection; 6) ensure the implementation of the defense, national security and foreign policies of the Republic; 7) ensure maintenance of law and order, take measures to strengthen the legal order and ensure rights and freedoms of the citizens; 8) perform other functions and powers provided by the Constitution and laws.

==== Program and budget ====
The Article 74 of the Constitution of Armenia states that the government must within twenty days of its formation present its developed program to the National Assembly of the Republic. Later on the National Assembly should discuss and vote for the approval of the program within five days after its presentation. The President shall dissolve the National Assembly if it does not give an approval to the program of the Government two times in succession within two months.

Regarding state budget, The Government shall submit the draft of the state budget to the National Assembly at least ninety days prior to the beginning of the fiscal year. The Government may put forward a motion of its confidence in conjunction with the adoption of the state budget. If the National Assembly does not express no confidence in the Government then the state budget as well as the amendments approved by the Government shall be considered adopted.

If the National Assembly expresses no confidence in the Government in conjunction to the draft of the state budget, the new Government shall submit the draft state budget to the National Assembly within a period of ten days after the approval of its program. This draft shall be debated and voted on by the National Assembly within a period of thirty days in accordance with the procedure defined by this Article.

==== Restriction on members ====
According to Article 88 of Armenian Constitution "A member of Government can not be engaged in hold an office in commercial organizations or in state and local self-government bodies not connected with his/her duties, or be involved in entrepreneurial activities, save for pedagogical creative, and academic activities."

==== Powers on local self-governed communities ====
Articles 109 and 110 of Armenian Constitution state that the Government may remove the Head of Community in cases prescribed by the law on the basis of the conclusion of the Constitutional Court. The communities may, based on the interests of the public, be merged with each other or separated by the law. The appropriate law shall be adopted by the National Assembly upon the recommendation of the Government. Before submitting the legislative initiative the Government shall appoint local referendums in those communities. The outcomes of the local referendums shall be attached to the legislative initiative. The communities may be merged or separated irrespective of the outcomes of the local referendums.

==== Regional governors ====
Based on Article 88.1, regional governors are appointed and dismissed by decisions of Government and they are validated by the President. The Regional Governors shall pursue the territorial policy of the Government, coordinate the activities of the territorial services of the executive bodies, save for cases prescribed by the law.

==== Powers regarding legislative initiatives ====
The Government has a right of legislative initiative. It has the right to determine the sequence of the debate for its proposed draft legislation and can demand that they be voted only with amendments acceptable to it.

The Government may put forward a motion on confidence in the Government in conjunction with the adoption of a draft law proposed by the Government. If within twenty four hours after the Government has raised the question of the vote of confidence a minimum of one third of the total number of Deputies does not put forward a draft resolution on expressing no confidence in the Government or if no resolution on expressing no confidence in the Government is adopted by the majority of the total number of Deputies the draft law proposed by the Government shall be considered adopted. However, the Government can not put the motion on confidence more than two times in any single session.

== Leaders ==
Each of the three Armenian Republics had an executive branch at the time of their existence, each being led by a prime minister.

=== Prime Ministers of Armenia ===
Prime Minister	Years in office	Party membership	Other information
Nikol Pashinyan	2018–	Civil Contract	See First Pashinyan government for list of cabinet members Acting prime minister after resignation on 16 October 2018. Re-elected on 14 January 2019. See Second Pashinyan government for list of cabinet members
Serzh Sargsyan	2018	RPA	See Second Serzh Sargsyan government for list of cabinet members. Serzh Sargsyan was elected as prime minister and resigned after six days under large scale protests known as 2018 Armenian Velvet Revolution
Karen Karapetyan	2016–2018	RPA	See Karapetyan government for list of cabinet members
Hovik Abrahamyan	2014–2016	RPA	See Abrahamyan government for list of cabinet members. President of the Council of the Armenian State University of Economics. Awarded First Grade medal "For Services Contributed to the Motherland." Awarded the Order of "Mesrop Mashtots" for services to the Republic of Artsakh.
Tigran Sargsyan	2008–2014	RPA	See Tigran Sargsyan government for list of cabinet members. Author of 20 scientific articles, has a military officer rank and Anania Shirakatsi Medal.
Serzh Sargsyan	2007–2008	RPA	Awarded Battle Cross, Tigran the Great and Golden Eagle orders and other State Awards. Holder of the title of Hero of Artsakh. He is president of the Armenian Chess Federation and the Yerevan State University Academic Board. President of RA since 2008.
Andranik Margaryan	2000–2007	RPA	Holder of Sourb Mesrop Mashtots Medal. Was decorated with V. Sargsyan and G. Nezhdeh medals of RA Ministry of Defense, V. Sargsyan order of the NEVU, Aram Manukian Medal of RA Police, F. Nansen Medal of Fridjof Nansen Foundation. Died from heart attack in 2007.
Aram Sargsyan	1999–2000	RPA	Member of Yerkrapah Volunteers Union, Vazgen Sargsyan's brother, founder and leader of Hanrapetutyun Party.
Vazgen Sargsyan	1999	RPA	National Hero of Artsakh, national hero of Armenia, holder of Golden Eagle Prose writer, member of former SU Writers' Union, author of articles and books Holder of Armenian Komsomol's Lenin award in literature
Armen Darbinyan	1998–1999	Non-party	Professor, RA NAS Corresponding Member, Doctor of Economics.
Robert Kocharyan	1997–1998	Non-party	RA president from 1998 to 2008. Holder of Gold Eagle Medal, Hero of Artsakh (NKR), Grigor Lusavorich order (NKR), Legion of Honor (France), Knight of Big Cross (Georgia), Order of Honor (IOC), Order of Vitautas the Great (Lithuania), Knight of Big Cross and White Eagle Order (Poland), Savior Order (Greece), Order of Lebanese Cedar (Lebanon) Awards.
Armen Sarkissian	1996–1997	Non-party	Member of the International Institute of Strategic Research and the British Astronomical Society, Honorary member of the Pan-Armenian Academic and Scientific Society, Candidate of physical and mathematical sciences. Author of 51 scientific articles and 3 manuals on politics, theoretical physics, astrophysics and computer modeling.
Hrant Bagratyan	1993–1995	Freedom Party of Armenia, ANC	Academician of Russia's Humanitarian Sciences Academy, Doctor of Economics and Philosophy 2005 - Honorary Doctor of Yerevan State Economics Institute 2006 - Independent journalists recognized him as the best economic public man of Armenia for the whole period of the independence. He has authored 7 books and 52 research papers.
Khosrov Harutyunyan	1992–1993	Christian Democrat Party	1996-1998–RA Government, senior adviser to the Prime Minister 1998-1999–RA National Assembly Speaker 1999-2000–RA Minister of Territorial Administration [15]
Gagik Harutyunyan	1991–1992	Non-party	Professor, Doctor of Law, President of the Center of Constitutional Law of Armenia, Coordinator of Emerging Democracy Constitutional Court Conference, Member of the International Academy of Information, International Constitutional Law Association Board Member,“Constitutional Justice” international bulletin's editorial board chairman, Member of Yerevan State University Law Department's Scientific Board, author of over 200 research works.
Vazgen Manukyan	1990–1991	ADU	Candidate of Physical and Mathematical Sciences, senior lecturer First chairman of AAM, Director of the Center of Strategic Studies.

=== Chairman of the Council of Ministers of the Armenian Soviet Socialist Republic ===
The governmental structure of the Armenian Soviet Socialist Republic was similar to that of the other Soviet republics. It is mentioned in the article 79 of USSR constitution "The highest executive and administrative organ of state power of a Union Republic is the Council of People's Commissars of the Union Republic". The council was formed by Supreme Soviet of the Union Republic, which was the only legislative body in a Union Republic and the highest organ of state power. The council consisted of the following positions:

- Chairman
- Vice-chairman
- Chairman of the State Planning Commission
- People's Commissars-of:
  - Food industry, light industry, agriculture, finance, internal trade, justice, education, municipal economy, public health etc.
- The Representative of the Committee of Agricultural Stocks
- Chief of the Board of Arts
- The Representative of the All-Union People's Commissariats

The Council issued orders and decisions and supervised their execution. The Council was responsible and accountable to Supreme Soviet of the Union Republic but between the sessions of the Union Republics Supreme Soviet, the Council was responsible and accountable to the Presidium of the same Supreme Soviet. The Council of People's Commissars controlled those branches of state administration that came within the jurisdiction of Union Republic. It issued within the limits of the jurisdiction of their respective People's Commissariats, orders and instructions. The Council of People's Commissariats of a Union Republic were either Union-Republic or Republican Commissariats. Union-Republican controlled those branches of the state administration that were entrusted to them and were subordinate both to the Council of People's Commissars of the Union Republic and to the appropriate Union-Republic People's Commissars of the U.S.S.R.. The Republican Commissariats again directed branches that were entrusted to them but were subordinate only to Council of People's Commissars of the Union Republic.

Prime Minister/Chairman	Years in office	Other information
Vladimir Margaryants	1989–1990	V. Margaryants had to deal with the reconstruction of the earthquake zone like his predecessor. He was appointed as the first minister over a dozen ministers from the Center.
Fadey Sargsyan	1977–1989	During the tenure of Fadey Sargsyan he always was in the territory of destruction of 1988, December 7 earthquake. He was responsible of eliminating the results of destructions.
Grigor Arzumanyan	1972–1976	Microelectronic, light and food industry developed rapidly during the tenure of Grigor Arzumanyan.
Badal Muradyan	1966–1972	B. Muradyan's tenure was during Brezhnev's "stagnation" and everything that was happening in Center transferred in a chain reaction to subordinate republics.
Anton Kochinyan	1952–1966	Arpa-Sevan underground aqueduct, the monument for the Genocide victims were built during Anton Kochinyan's tenure. The idea to build a metro in Yerevan and the decision of building the atomic electro station also were A. Kochinyan's.
Sahak Karapetyan	1947–1952	During S. Karapetyan tenure the large immigration took place. In 1949 in the middle of Karapetyan's tenure 12,000 Armenians were deported to Altai.
Aghasi Sargsyan	1943–1947	Aghasi Sargsyan's tenure was the most difficult one, as he was a prime minister/chairman during the World War II, but he was able to overcome that and move the country from that situation.
Aram Piruzyan	1937–1943	Piruzyan's tenure was at the beginning of World War II and he was responsible for organizing the production of military products in factories.
Mushegh Danelyan (Note: Also spelled "Danielyan" in some sources.)	1937–1937	Danelyan was appointed to lead the Armenian government by Anastas Mikoyan on 23 September 1937. He was arrested in Yerevan on 19 October of that year and later posthumously rehabilitated during the Khrushchev Thaw on 24 September 1955.
Abraham Guloyan	1935–1937	Guloyan's tenure coincided with the Great Purge in Soviet Armenia. Guloyan himself was not spared from the repressions and was arrested on 14 September 1937 by Georgy Malenkov in Yerevan, on the personal orders of Joseph Stalin.
Sahak Ter-Gabrielyan	1928–1935	Ter-Gabrielyan was another victim of Stalinism. During his tenure, several revolutions took place in villages and it was very difficult to govern the country, but he was able to create several new industrial branches.
Sargis Hambardzumyan	1925–1928	The first and second hydroelectric stations were built during the tenure of S. Hambardzumyan. He also was Zangezur cooper mines heas till 1928.
Sargis Lukashin (Srapionyan)	1922–1925	Lukashin was the one who started to create a new economy in country. In 1923 he began the construction of hydro power plants, he built Hrazdan river hydro power plant, but the construction was ended the time when he was no longer the prime minister.
Alexandr Myasnikyan	1921–1922	Alexandr Myasnikyan was the first chairman of Soviet Armenia. Al. Tamanyan who was banished from Armenia returned during his tenure. Alexandr Myasnikyan died on the plane, while flying to Abkhazia, and there are opinions that it was a murder organized by Lavrenti Beria.

=== Prime Ministers of the First Armenian Republic ===
On May 30, 1918, Armenian Revolutionary Federation (ARF) decided that Armenia must be a republic under a provisional coalition government. It was decided that the Republic must have its own constitution and self-governing system. The government of the Republic was headed by prime minister. He was chosen by the National Council of Armenia. Later on the prime minister himself formed his cabinet. Prime minister was accountable for international, domestic and regional issues. The first prime minister became Hovhannes Katchaznouni whose cabinet was made up from five members, all of which were from ARF. In addition, a ministry of interior was created, whose first head was Aram Manukian. The ministry of interior was responsible for domestic problems. Its key responsibilities were to create public school system, railroad system, communication and telegraph systems, also it was responsible for enforcing law and order. All these responsibilities were controlled by a specific department, each of which became a separate ministry later on.

Prime minister had direct involvement in regional and international issues. Hamazasp Ohanjyan, the third prime minister, and Avetis Aharonian left for Berlin trying to reassure the tense relations between Turkey and Armenia. Unfortunately none of them succeeded to accomplish his goal.

Prime Minister	Years in office	Political party	Other information
Simon Vratsyan	11/1920–12/1920	ARF	The government headed by Simon Vratsyan had a short life (8 days). The government wanted to create a peaceful combination with neighbor countries and remove the country from the “whirlpool”.
Hamazasp Ohanjanyan	05/1920–11/1920	ARF	During the tenure of Hamazasp Ohanjanyan in agriculture and state property industries the important work was done. The government also confirmed academic Al. Tamanyan's and painter Kojoyan's project of national coat of arms. On August 10 the Sèvres treaty was signed and was created a United Armenia, which was a dream of centuries.
Alexandr Khatisyan	05/1919–05/1920	ARF	During 1919–1920 the government had problems with a favorable state loans creation, giving state assistance to working-class people, encouraging the entrance of private capital, use productive taxation mechanisms. Also the government decided not to solve problems with neighbors with the help of weapon.
Hovhannes Kajaznuni	07/1918–05/1919	ARF	The first prime minister of the First Republic of Armenia was Hovhannes Qajaznani/Igitghanyan. The economy at that time was in very difficult situation, there was no food, no transportation. The prime minister was sent to Europe and USA to find a solution of that problem. He was able to bring back three hundred thousand bags of flour, canned products and a lot of crops. He also was a victim of violence in Soviet Union.

== See also ==
- Audit Chamber of Armenia
- National Assembly (Armenia)
- Politics of Armenia
- President of Armenia
- Prime Minister of Armenia
