= First Pashinyan government =

Government of Armenia

First government of Nikol Pashinyan
- 16th government of Armenia

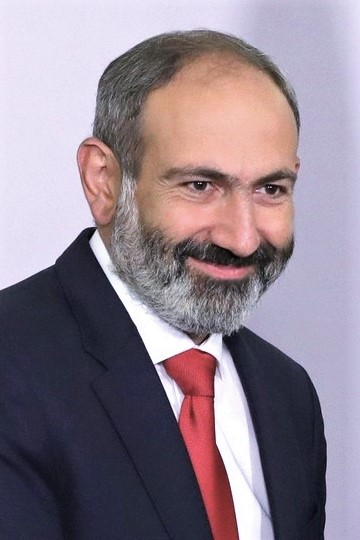
- Nikol Pashinyan (2018)
- Date formed: 12 May 2018
- Date dissolved: 14 January 2019

People and organisations
- Head of state: Armen Sarkissian
- Head of government: Nikol Pashinyan
- Deputy head of government: Ararat Mirzoyan
- No. of ministers: 17
- Member parties: Way Out Alliance
- Status in legislature: Minority government
- Opposition parties: Republican; Tsarukyan Alliance; Armenian Revolutionary Federation
- Opposition leader: Serzh Sargsyan

History
- Predecessor: Second Serzh Sargsyan government
- Successor: Second Pashinyan government

The First Pashinyan government was the 16th government of Armenia and the governing body from 12 May 2018 to 14 January 2019. Nikol Pashinyan was appointed Prime Minister by President Armen Sarkissian on 8 May 2018, after receiving a majority of votes in the National Assembly.

It was a minority government ruled by parliamentary group Way Out Alliance consisted of three political parties: Civil Contract, Bright Armenia and the Hanrapetutyun Party.

It was a coalition government formed by Way Out Alliance, Tsarukyan Alliance, and Armenian Revolutionary Federation until 3 October 2018.

The current structure of the government of Armenia consists of seventeen ministries and eight adjunct bodies. Each ministry is responsible for elaborating and implementing governmental decisions in its respective sphere.

On 3 October 2018, Pashinyan fired six ministers after their parties (Armenian Revolutionary Federation and Tsarukyan Alliance) supported a controversial bill which will make it harder for the Prime Minister to call snap elections to the National Assembly. On the same day, the ARF accused Pashinyan of "attempting to establish one-party rule in Armenia".

== Structure ==
=== Governing staff ===
Main office holders
Office	Name	Party	Affiliation/quota	Since
Prime Minister	Nikol Pashinyan	Civil Contract	Way Out Alliance	8 May 2018
First Deputy Prime Minister	Ararat Mirzoyan	Civil Contract	Way Out Alliance	11 May 2018
Deputy Prime Minister	Tigran Avinyan	Civil Contract	Way Out Alliance	11 May 2018
Deputy Prime Minister	Mher Grigoryan	Independent	Tsarukyan Alliance	12 May 2018
Minister of Agriculture	Artur Khachatryan	Armenian Revolutionary Federation	Armenian Revolutionary Federation	12 May 2018 - 3 October 2018
Minister of Agriculture	Gegham Gevoryan			16 October 2018
Minister of Culture	Lilit Makunts	Independent	Way Out Alliance	12 May 2018
Minister of Defence	Davit Tonoyan	Independent	Way Out Alliance	11 May 2018
Minister of Diaspora	Mkhitar Hayrapetyan	Civil Contract	Way Out Alliance	11 May 2018
Minister of Economic Development and Investments	Artsvik Minasyan	Armenian Revolutionary Federation	Armenian Revolutionary Federation	12 May 2018 - 3 October 2018
Minister of Economic Development and Investments	Tigran Khachatryan			16 October 2018
Minister of Education and Science	Arayik Harutyunyan	Civil Contract	Way Out Alliance	11 May 2018
Minister of Emergency Situations	Hrachya Rostomyan	Independent	Tsarukyan Alliance	12 May 2018 - 3 October 2018
Minister of Emergency Situations	Feliks Tsolakyan	Independent		4 October 2018
Minister of Energy Infrastructures and Natural Resources	Artur Grigoryan	Prosperous Armenia	Tsarukyan Alliance	12 May 2018 - 3 October 2018
Minister of Energy Infrastructures and Natural Resources	Garegin Baghramyan	Independent		4 October 2018
Minister of Finance	Atom Janjughazyan	Independent	Way Out Alliance	12 May 2018
Minister of Foreign Affairs	Zohrab Mnatsakanian	Independent	Way Out Alliance	12 May 2018
Minister of Health	Arsen Torosyan	Independent	Way Out Alliance	12 May 2018
Minister of Justice	Artak Zeynalyan	Hanrapetutyun Party	Way Out Alliance	12 May 2018
Minister of Labor and Social Affairs	Mane Tandilyan	Bright Armenia	Way Out Alliance	12 May 2018 - 14 November 2018
Minister of Nature Protection	Erik Grigoryan	Independent	Way Out Alliance	12 May 2018
Minister of Sport and Youth Affairs	Levon Vahradyan	Prosperous Armenia	Tsarukyan Alliance	12 May 2018 - 3 October 2018
Minister of Sport and Youth Affairs	Gabriel Ghazaryan			10 October 2018
Minister of Territorial Administration and Development	Suren Papikyan	Civil Contract	Way Out Alliance	11 May 2018
Minister of Transport, Communication and Information Technologies	Ashot Hakobyan	Independent	Tsarukyan Alliance	12 May 2018 - 3 October 2018
Minister of Transport, Communication and Information Technologies	Hakob Arshakyan	Civil Contract	Way Out Alliance	4 October 2018

=== Bodies under the Government ===
Body	Head	Since
Committee of the Real Estate Cadastre	Sarhat Petrosyan	9 August 2018
Education Inspectorate	Aleksandr Shagafyan	9 July 2018
Food Safety Inspectorate	Georgi Avetisyan	21 June 2018
Health and Labor Inspectorate	Hovhannes Navasardyan	27 March 2018
Nature Protection and Subsoil Inspectorate	Artur H. Grigoryan	21 June 2018
Market Surveillance Inspection Body	vacant	
Nuclear Safety Committee	Ashot Martirosyan	17 September 2008
State Revenue Committee	Davit Ananyan	17 May 2018
Statistics Committee	Stepan Mnatsakanyan	21 May 2018
Urban Development Committee	Avetiq Eloyan	15 June 2018
Urban Development, Technical Standards and Fire Safety Inspectorate	vacant	

=== Bodies under the Prime Minister ===
Body	Head	Since
National Security Service	Artur Vanetsyan	10 May 2018
Police	Valeriy Osipyan	10 May 2018
State Inspection Service	Davit Sanasaryan	21 May 2018
