= Karapetyan government =

Government of Armenia

Government of Karen Karapetyan
- 14th government of Armenia

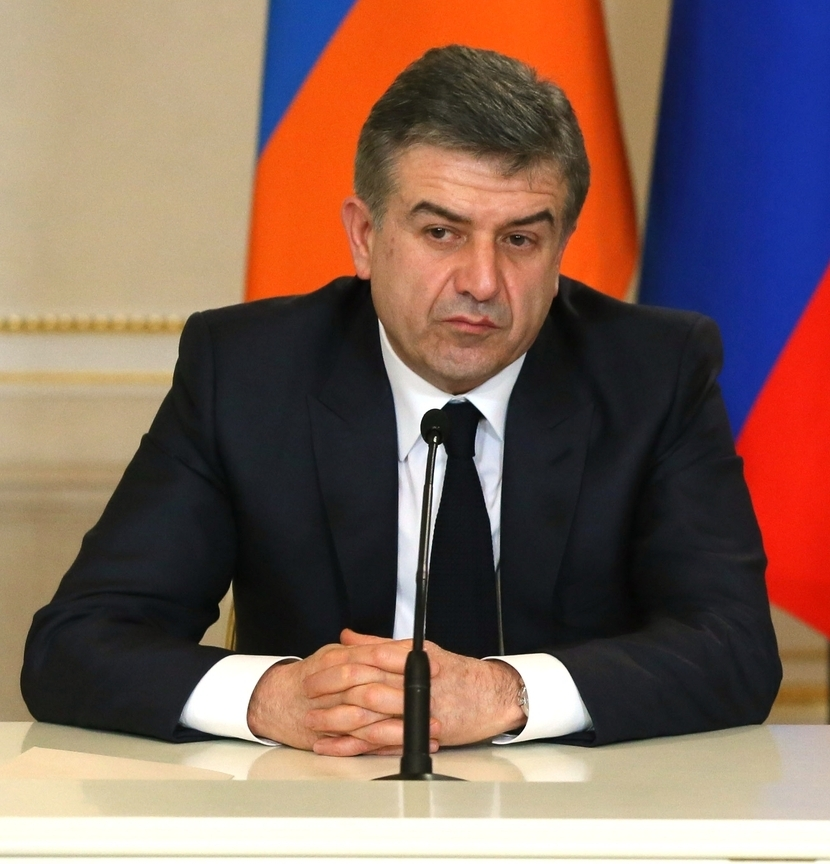
- Karen Karapetyan (2017)
- Date formed: 27 September 2016
- Date dissolved: 17 April 2018

People and organisations
- Head of state: Serzh Sargsyan
- Head of government: Karen Karapetyan
- Deputy head of government: Vache Gabrielyan
- No. of ministers: 18
- Member parties: Republican Party; ARF
- Status in legislature: Coalition
- Opposition parties: Tsarukyan Alliance; Way Out Alliance

History
- Predecessor: Abrahamyan government
- Successor: Second Serzh Sargsyan government

Karapetyan's government was the governing body of Armenia from September 2016 until April 2018. Karen Karapetyan was designated prime minister by President Serzh Sargsyan on 13 September 2016.

It was a coalition government formed by two parliamentary groups: the Republicans and Revolutionary Federation.

The cabinet consisted of eighteen ministries and eight adjunct bodies. Each ministry is responsible for elaborating and implementing governmental decisions in its respective sphere.

== Structure ==
=== Ministries ===
Main office holders
Office	Name	Party	Since
Prime Minister of Armenia	Karen Karapetyan	Republican Party	13 September 2016
Vice prime minister Minister of International Economic Integration and Reforms	Vache Gabrielyan	Republican Party	20 September 2016
Minister of Defence	Vigen Sargsyan	Republican Party	3 October 2016
Minister of Economic Development and Investments	Suren Karayan	Republican Party	27 September 2016
Minister of Agriculture	Ignati Arakelyan	Republican Party	20 September 2016
Minister of Culture	Armen Amiryan	Republican Party	27 September 2016
Minister of Diaspora	Hranush Hakobyan	Republican Party	1 October 2008
Minister of Nature Protection	Artsvik Minasyan	Armenian Revolutionary Federation	27 September 2016
Minister of Education and Science	Levon Mkrtchyan	Armenian Revolutionary Federation	27 September 2016
Minister of Energy Infrastructures and Natural Resources	Ashot Manukyan	Non-partisan	20 September 2016
Minister of Finance	Vardan Aramyan	Republican Party	20 September 2016
Minister of Foreign Affairs	Eduard Nalbandyan	Non-partisan	15 April 2008
Ministry of Health	Levon Altunyan	Republican Party	27 September 2016
Minister of Justice	Davit Harutyunyan	Republican Party	25 May 2017
Minister of Labor and Social Affairs	Artem Asatryan	Republican Party	16 June 2012
Minister of Sport and Youth Affairs	Hrachya Rostomyan	Non-partisan	27 September 2016
Minister of Territorial Administration and Development	Davit Lokyan	Armenian Revolutionary Federation	27 September 2016
Minister of Emergency Situations	Davit Tonoyan	Non-partisan	6 February 2017
Minister of Transport, Communication and Information Technologies	Vahan Martirosyan	Republican Party	20 September 2016

=== Adjunct bodies ===
The role of adjunct bodies is to elaborate, implement and administer governmental decision in respective sphere. Similar to ministries, adjunct bodies are subordinate to Prime Minister. There are eight adjunct bodies to Armenian government.

Adjunct body	Head	Party	Since in office
General Department of Civil Aviation	Sergey Avetisyan	Non-party	8 June 2016
National Security Service	Georgy Kutoyan	Non-party	12 February 2016
State Nuclear Safety Regulatory Committee by the Government	Ashot Martirosyan	Non-party	17 September 2008
Police	Vladimir Gasparyan	Non-party	1 November 2011
State Committee of the Real Estate Cadastre	Martin Sargsyan	Republican Party	3 June 2014
State Property Management Department	Arman Sahakyan	Republican Party	22 June 2011
State Revenue Committee	Vardan Harutyunyan	Non-party	8 October 2016
State Urban Development Committee	Narek Sargsyan	Non-party	11 October 2016
