= Second Pashinyan government =

Government of Armenia

Second government of Nikol Pashinyan
- 17th government of Armenia

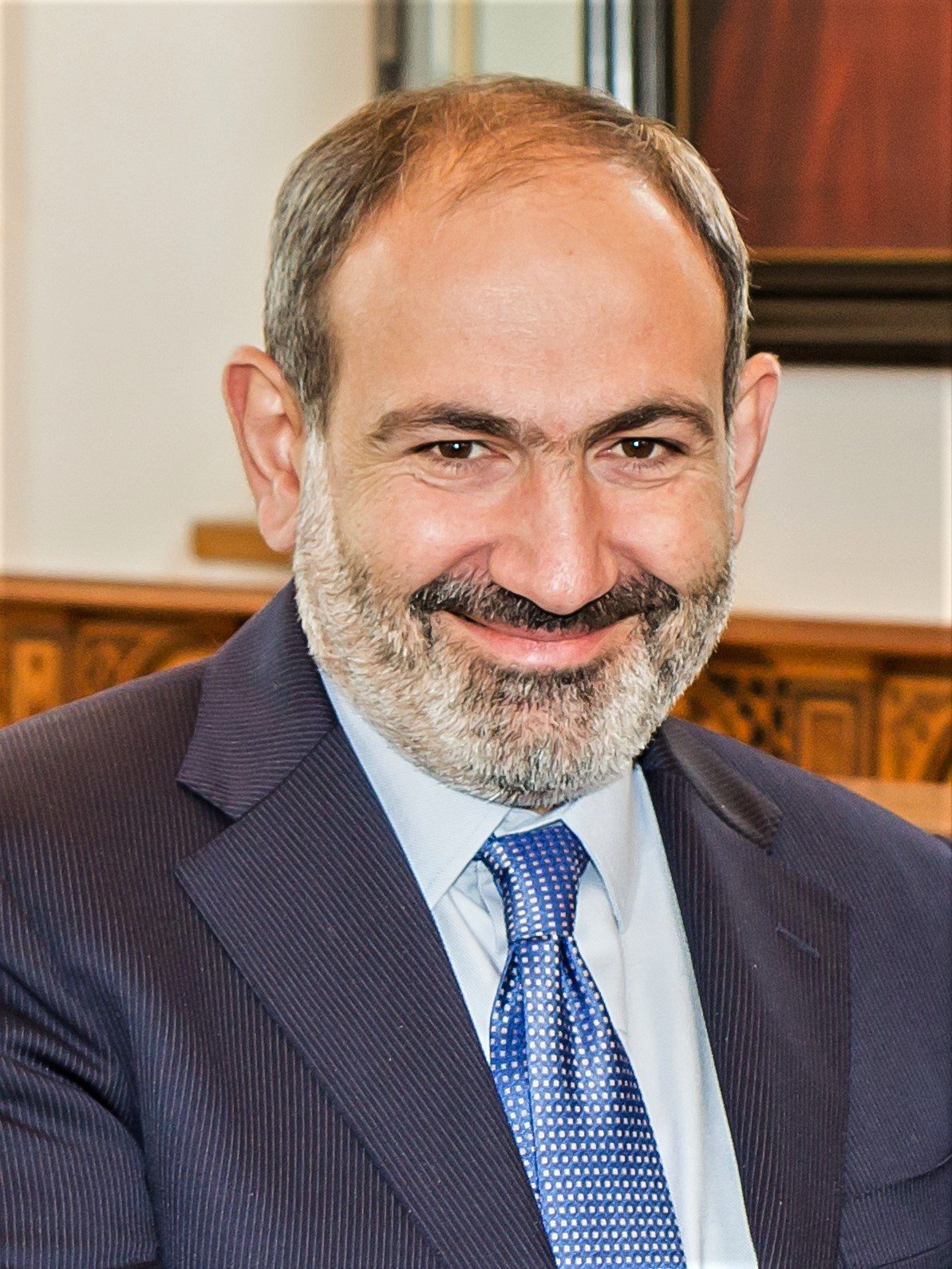
- Nikol Pashinyan (2019)
- Date formed: 14 January 2019
- Date dissolved: 2 August 2021

People and organisations
- Head of state: Armen Sarkissian
- Head of government: Nikol Pashinyan
- Deputy head of government: Tigran Avinyan; Mher Grigoryan
- Member parties: My Step Alliance (Civil Contract, Mission)
- Status in legislature: Majority
- Opposition parties: Prosperous Armenia; Bright Armenia

History
- Election: 2018 Armenian parliamentary election
- Predecessor: First Pashinyan government
- Successor: Third Pashinyan government

The Second Pashinyan government was the executive branch of the government of Armenia from 14 January 2019 to 2 August 2021. Nikol Pashinyan was appointed Prime Minister by President Armen Sarkissian on 14 January 2019, after My Step Alliance's decisive victory in the 2018 Armenian parliamentary election.

The Government was formed by the My Step Alliance, which consisted of the Civil Contract Party and the much smaller Mission Party.

The National Assembly approved a reduction to 12 ministries from the previous 17.

== Structure ==
=== Governing staff ===
Office	Name	Image	Party	Since	Until
Prime Minister	Nikol Pashinyan		Civil Contract	14 January 2019	
Deputy Prime Minister	Tigran Avinyan		Civil Contract	16 January 2019	
Deputy Prime Minister	Mher Grigoryan		Independent	16 January 2019	
Minister of Defence	David Tonoyan		Independent	19 January 2019	20 November 2020
Minister of Defence	Vagharshak Harutiunyan		Independent	20 November 2020	3 August 2021
Minister of Economy	Tigran Khachatryan (hy)		Independent	19 January 2019	26 November 2020
Minister of Economy	Vahan Kerobyan (hy)		Independent	26 November 2020	
Minister of Education, Science, Culture and Sport	Arayik Harutyunyan (hy)		Civil Contract	19 January 2019	23 November 2020
Minister of Education, Science, Culture and Sport	Vahram Dumanyan (hy)		Independent	23 November 2020	
Minister of Emergency Situations	Feliks Tsolakyan		Independent	19 January 2019	20 November 2020
Minister of Emergency Situations	Andranik Piloyan (hy)		Independent	20 November 2020	
Minister of Finance	Atom Janjughazyan (hy)		Independent	19 January 2019	
Minister of Foreign Affairs	Zohrab Mnatsakanyan		Independent	19 January 2019	16 November 2020
Minister of Foreign Affairs	Ara Ayvazyan		Independent	18 November 2020	27 May 2021
Minister of Health	Anahit Avanesian		Civil Contract	January 2021	
Minister of Justice	Artak Zeynalyan		Hanrapetutyun	19 January 2019	7 June 2019
Minister of Justice	Rustam Badasyan		Independent	19 June 2019	
Minister of Labor and Social Affairs	Zaruhi Batoyan		Civil Contract	19 January 2019	20 November 2020
Minister of Labor and Social Affairs	Mesrop Arakelyan (hy)		Mission Party	20 November 2020	23 April 2021
Minister of Environment	Erik Grigoryan (hy)		Independent	19 January 2019	5 May 2020
Minister of Environment	Romanos Petrosyan (hy)		Civil Contract	31 July 2020	
Ministry of Territorial Administration and Infrastructure	Suren Papikyan (hy)		Civil Contract	19 January 2019	
Minister of High-Tech Industry	Hakob Arshakyan (hy)		Civil Contract	19 January 2019	2 April 2021
Minister of High-Tech Industry	Hayk Chobanyan (hy)		Independent	2 April 2021	
