= Third Pashinyan government =

Government of Armenia

Third government of Nikol Pashinyan
- 18th government of Armenia

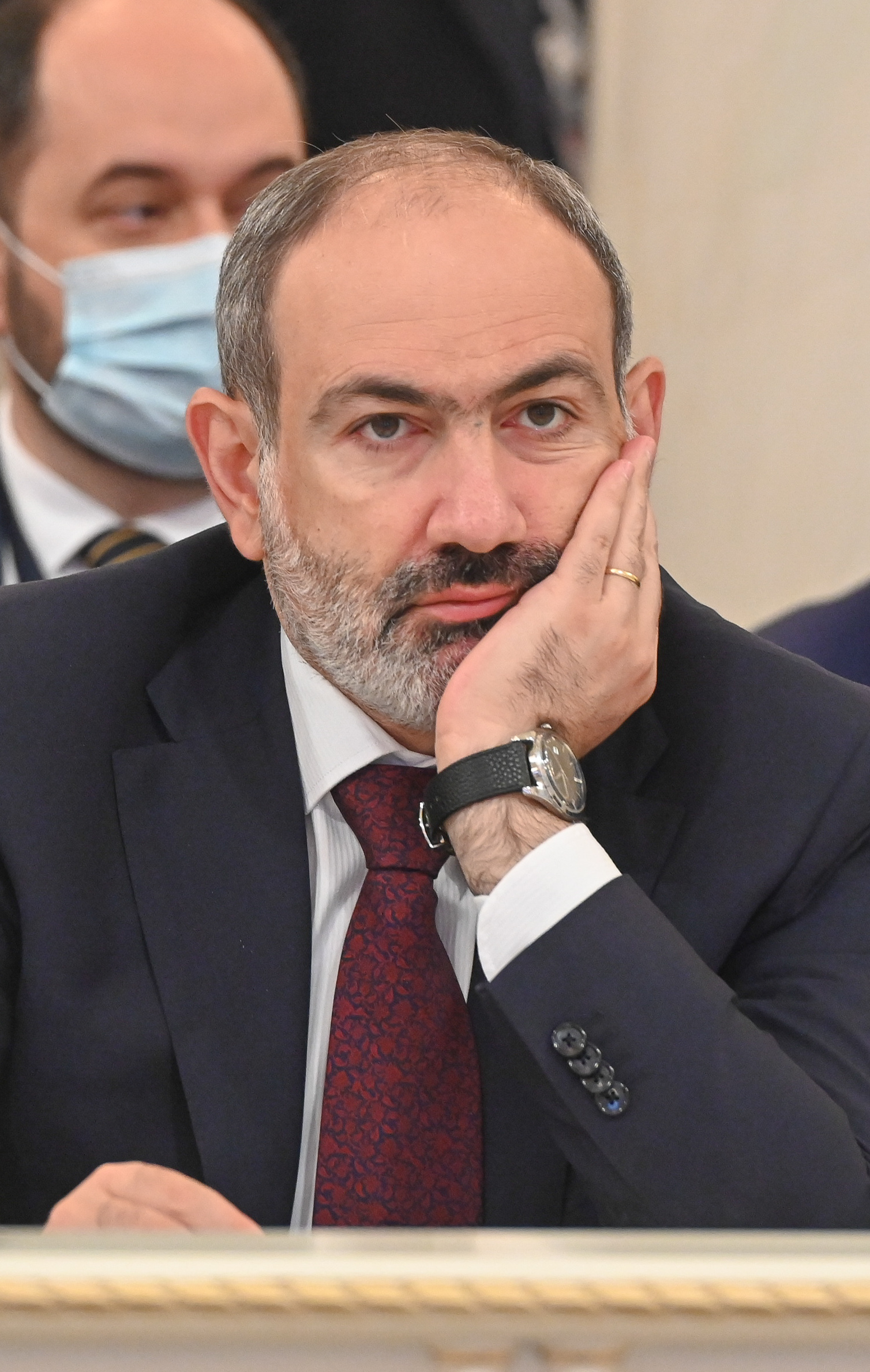
- Nikol Pashinyan (2021)
- Date formed: 2 August 2021
- Date dissolved: 2 August 2026

People and organisations
- Head of state: Vahagn Khachaturyan
- Head of government: Nikol Pashinyan
- Deputy head of government: Tigran Khachatryan; Mher Grigoryan
- Member party: Civil Contract
- Status in legislature: Majority
- Opposition parties: Armenia Alliance; I Have Honor Alliance

History
- Election: 2021 Armenian parliamentary election
- Predecessor: Second Pashinyan government
- Successor: Fourth Pashinyan government

The Third Pashinyan government was the 18th government of Armenia from 2 August 2021 to 2 August 2026. Nikol Pashinyan continued in his role as prime minister after his Civil Contract Party's victory in the 2021 Armenian snap parliamentary elections.

== Structure ==
Office	Name	Image	Party	Since	Until
Prime Minister	Nikol Pashinyan		Civil Contract	8 May 2018	
Deputy Prime Minister	Tigran Khachatryan		Independent	19 December 2022	
Deputy Prime Minister	Mher Grigoryan		Independent	11 May 2018	
Minister of Defence	Arshak Karapetyan		Independent	3 August 2021	15 November 2021
Minister of Defence	Suren Papikyan		Civil Contract	15 November 2021	
Minister of Economy	Vahan Kerobyan (hy)		Independent	26 November 2020	14 February 2024
Minister of Economy	Gevorg Papoyan		Civil Contract	5 March 2024	
Minister of Education, Science, Culture and Sport	Vahram Dumanyan (hy)		Independent	23 November 2020	12 December 2022
Minister of Education, Science, Culture and Sport	Zhanna Andreasyan		Independent	13 December 2022	
Minister of Emergency Situations	Andranik Piloyan (hy)		Independent	20 November 2020	1 April 2022
Minister of Emergency Situations	Armen Pambukhchyan		Civil Contract	12 April 2022	
Minister of Finance	Tigran Khachatryan (hy)		Independent	3 August 2021	19 December 2022
Minister of Finance	Vahe Hovhannisyan		Civil Contract	20 December 2022	
Minister of Foreign Affairs	Ararat Mirzoyan		Civil Contract	19 August 2021	
Minister of Health	Anahit Avanesian		Civil Contract	18 January 2021	
Minister of Justice	Karen Andreasyan		Civil Contract	3 August 2021	5 October 2022
Minister of Justice	Grigor Minasyan		Independent	26 December 2022	5 November 2024
Minister of Justice	Srbuhi Galyan		Independent	5 November 2024	
Minister of Labor and Social Affairs	Narek Mkrtchyan (hy)		Civil Contract	2 August 2021	
Minister of Environment	Romanos Petrosyan (hy)		Civil Contract	30 July 2020	9 December 2021
Minister of Environment	Hakob Simidyan		Civil Contract	10 December 2022	
Ministry of Territorial Administration and Infrastructure	Gnel Sanosyan (hy)		Civil Contract	2 August 2021	
Minister of High-Tech Industry	Vahagn Khachaturyan		Independent	4 August 2021	3 March 2022
Minister of High-Tech Industry	Robert Khachatryan		Independent	27 April 2022	29 December 2023
Minister of High-Tech Industry	Mkhitar Hayrapetyan		Civil Contract	29 December 2023	
Minister of Internal Affairs	Arpine Sargsyan		Independent	20 November 2024	

== See also ==
- Politics of Armenia
