= Vazgen Manukyan government =

Vazgen Manukyan's cabinet
- 1st Cabinet of Armenia

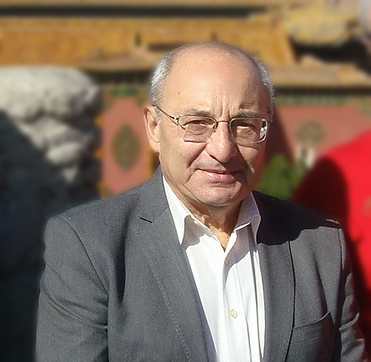
- Vazgen Manukyan
- Date formed: 13 August 1990
- Date dissolved: 22 November 1991

People and organisations
- Head of state: Levon Ter-Petrosyan
- Head of government: Vazgen Manukyan
- Member parties: National Democratic Union

History
- Successor: Gagik Harutyunyan

The cabinet of Vazgen Manukyan in Armenia was formed August 13, 1990.

== Cabinet ==
=== Inaugural cabinet: 13 August 1990 – 22 November 1991 ===
Incumbent	Minister	Ministry	Party
Gagik Harutyunyan	Prime Minister (Վարչապետ)	Prime Minister	National Democratic Union
Henrik Kochinian	Automobile Transportation		
Robert Avoyan	Communal Industry		
Gagik Martirosian	Construction		
Yuri Melik-Ohandjanian	Culture		
Artak Davtian	Domestic Trade		
Janik Janoyan	Finance		
Robert Mehrabyan	Food Industry		
Yesayi Stepanian	Foreign Trade Relations		
Ashot Yeghiazaryan	Foreign Affairs		
Rafael Shahbazian	Grain Products		
Simeon Akhumian	Higher and Special Education		
Artashes Aznavurian	Health		
Karlos Kazarian	Internal Affairs		
Vahe Stepanyan	Justice		
Ashot Yesayan	Labor and Social Welfare		
Robert Mkrtchian	Light Industry		
Yurik Javadian	Servicr and Water Supply		
Misak Davtian	Public Education		
Georgi Melkumian	Road Construction and Maintenance		

== See also ==
- Government of Armenia
- Cabinet of Armenia
