= Prime Minister of Armenia =

Head of government

Prime Minister of the Republic of Armenia Հայաստանի Հանրապետության վարչապետ
- Coat of arms of Armenia

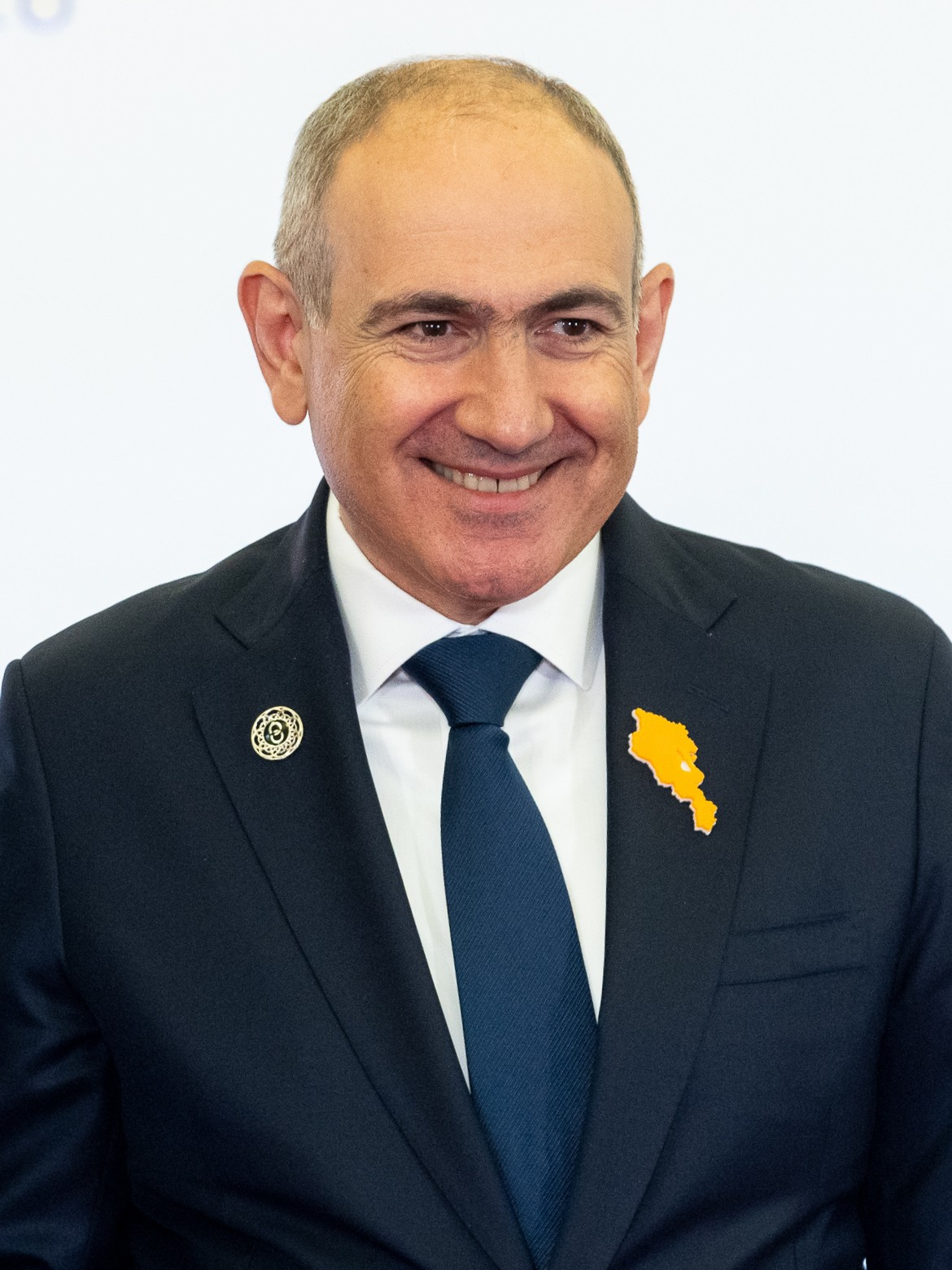
- Incumbent; Nikol Pashinyan since 8 May 2018
- Government of Armenia; Prime Minister's Office
- Style: Mr. Prime Minister (formal); His Excellency (diplomatic, abroad)
- Status: Head of government
- Member of: Cabinet of Armenia; Security Council
- Residence: Prime Minister's Residence
- Seat: Yerevan
- Appointer: President of Armenia, based on appointee's ability to command confidence in the National Assembly
- Term length: No term limit Parliamentary elections to the National Assembly are held every five years at most. After election Prime Minister and the Cabinet resigns and the newly elected National Assembly approves the Prime Minister.
- Constituting instrument: Constitution of Armenia
- Inaugural holder: Hovhannes Kajaznuni
- Formation: 30 June 1918
- Deputy: Deputy Prime Minister
- Salary: ֏ 15,079,920 / US$38,825 annually
- Website: www.primeminister.am

The prime minister of the Republic of Armenia (Armenian: Հայաստանի Հանրապետության վարչապետ, romanized: Hayastani Hanrapetut’yan varch’apet) is the head of government and most senior minister within the Armenian government, and is required by the constitution to "determine the main directions of policy of the Government, manage the activities of the Government and coordinate the work of the members of the Government." Also, according to the constitution, the prime minister heads the Security Council, which prescribes the main directions of the country's defense policy; thus, the prime minister is effectively the commander-in-chief of the Armed Forces of Armenia. Nikol Pashinyan is the current prime minister. He took the office on 8 May 2018 following the resignation of Serzh Sargsyan.

== History ==
=== Original role ===
The office of prime minister was first established in 1918 with the foundation of the First Republic of Armenia. The prime minister chosen by the National Council of Armenia and was accountable for international, domestic and regional issues. The first prime minister became Hovhannes Katchaznouni whose cabinet was made up from five members, all of which were from ARF. In addition, a ministry of interior was created, whose first head was Aram Manukian. It vanished when the First Republic of Armenia was incorporated into the Transcaucasian Socialist Federative Soviet Republic and then transferred into a full Soviet republic.

=== Soviet era ===
The governmental structure of the Armenian Soviet Socialist Republic was similar to that of the other Soviet republics. The highest executive and administrative organ of state power was the Council of Ministers. The Council consisted of the following positions:

- Chairman
- Vice Chairman
- Chairman of the State Planning Commission
- Cabinet Ministers
- Representative of the Committee of Agricultural Stocks
- Chairman of the Board of Arts
- Representative of the All-Union People's Commissariat

=== Restoration ===
When Armenia regained its independence in 1991, the office of prime minister was reintroduced. Under the new 2015 constitution, the prime minister is the most powerful and influential person in Armenian politics. The prime minister is appointed by the president of Armenia upon the vote of the National Assembly. The prime minister can be removed by a vote of no confidence in Parliament. In the constitutional referendum held in 2015, citizens voted in favor of transferring Armenia into a parliamentary republic.

== Selection ==
Following a general election, after commencement of the term of the newly-elected National Assembly the president appoints the representative of the party a plurality of seats in the assembly (i.e. the largest party). Factions of the National Assembly are entitled to nominate candidates for prime minister within a period of seven days.

== Deputy ==
The principal deputy of the prime minister is the deputy prime minister, the possibility of having more than one deputy prime minister, but no more than three.

=== Current deputies ===
Title	Portfolio/Area of responsibility	Name
Deputy Prime Minister	Labor and social affairs; Healthcare; Justice; Civil defense; Environment; Natural resources; Education and science; Culture and sports; Territorial administration and local self-government; Infrastructure; Urban development; Real estate cadastre; State property; Investments; Business environment; Fiscal and budgetary affairs; High-tech industry; Communications; Charity; Civil Service	Mher Grigoryan
Deputy Prime Minister	Financial and payment and settlement system; Tax and customs system; External and internal security; Justice; Anti-corruption and judicial; Labor and social issues; Healthcare; Environmental protection; Efficient use of natural resources; Education and science; Youth; Culture and sports; Urban development; Infrastructure; State property and assets; Economy; Investments; Business environment; Foreign economic relations; International trade; High-tech industry; Communication and telecommunications; Public administration; Strategic planning; Public service provision; Human capital development reforms in the public sector; Chief Information Coordinator; E-society; Economy and e-governance	Tigran Khachatryan

== Prime minister's office ==
The prime minister's staff has the task of ensuring the enforcement of the powers vested in the prime minister and the deputy prime ministers, as well as making preparations for Cabinet meetings:

== Bodies subordinate to the prime minister ==
- National Security Service
- Foreign Intelligence Service
- State Protection Service
- State Supervisory Service

== List of officeholders (1991–present) ==
Since the country's independence, it has had 16 prime ministers, none of whom were women.

NDU (1) PANM (1) RPA (7) Civil Contract (1)
No.	Name (Birth–Death)	Portrait	Political party	Term of office		Election (Parliament)	Government	
No.	Name (Birth–Death)	Portrait	Political party	Term of office		Election (Parliament)	No.	Composition
1	Vazgen Manukyan (born 1946)		PANM	13 August 1990	25 September 1991 (Independence)	1990	1st	Independents • PANM
	Vazgen Manukyan (born 1946)		NDU	25 September 1991 (Independence)	22 November 1991	1990	1st	Independents • PANM • NDU
2	Gagik Harutyunyan (born 1948)		Independent	22 November 1991	30 July 1992	1990	2nd	Independents • PANM
3	Khosrov Harutyunyan (born 1948)		Independent	30 July 1992	2 February 1993	1990	3rd	Independents • PANM
4	Hrant Bagratyan (born 1958)		PANM	2 February 1993	26 July 1995	1990	4th	Independents • PANM
4	Hrant Bagratyan (born 1958)		PANM	26 July 1995	4 November 1996	1995	5th	PANM • RPA
5	Armen Sarkissian (born 1952)		Independent	4 November 1996	20 March 1997	1995	6th	PANM • RPA
6	Robert Kocharyan (born 1954)		Independent	20 March 1997	10 April 1998	1995	7th	RPA • ARF
7	Armen Darbinyan (born 1965)		Independent	10 April 1998	11 June 1999	1995	8th	RPA • ARF • ACP
8	Vazgen Sargsyan (1959–1999)		RPA	11 June 1999	27 October 1999	1999	9th	RPA • PPA • ARF
9	Aram Sargsyan (born 1961)		RPA	3 November 1999	2 May 2000	1999	10th	RPA • PPA • ARF
10	Andranik Margaryan (1951–2007)		RPA	2 May 2000	25 May 2003	1999	11th	RPA • PPA • ARF • Heritage
10	Andranik Margaryan (1951–2007)		RPA	25 May 2003	25 March 2007 (Died in office)	2003	12th	RPA • ARF • Heritage
—	Serzh Sargsyan (born 1954)		RPA	25 March 2007	4 April 2007	2003	12th	RPA • ARF • Heritage
11	Serzh Sargsyan (born 1954)		RPA	4 April 2007	7 April 2008	2003	13th	RPA • ARF • Heritage
12	Tigran Sargsyan (born 1960)		RPA	9 April 2008	6 May 2012	2007	14th	RPA • ARF • OEK • PAP
12	Tigran Sargsyan (born 1960)		RPA	6 May 2012	19 April 2013	2012	15th	RPA • OEK
12	Tigran Sargsyan (born 1960)		RPA	19 April 2013	13 April 2014	2012	16th	RPA • OEK
13	Hovik Abrahamyan (born 1959)		RPA	13 April 2014	8 September 2016	2012	17th	RPA • OEK • ARF
14	Karen Karapetyan (born 1963)		RPA	13 September 2016	18 May 2017	2012	18th	RPA • ARF
14	Karen Karapetyan (born 1963)		RPA	18 May 2017	17 April 2018	2017	19th	RPA • ARF
15	Serzh Sargsyan (born 1954)		RPA	17 April 2018	23 April 2018	2017	20th	RPA • ARF
—	Karen Karapetyan (born 1963)		RPA	23 April 2018	8 May 2018	2017	20th	RPA • ARF
16	Nikol Pashinyan (born 1975)		Civil Contract (Yelk / My Step)	8 May 2018	14 January 2019	2017	21st	Yelk • Tsarukyan Alliance • ARF
16	Nikol Pashinyan (born 1975)		Civil Contract (Yelk / My Step)	14 January 2019	2 August 2021	2018	22nd	Civil Contract • Mission • Hanrapetutyun
16	Nikol Pashinyan (born 1975)		Civil Contract (Yelk / My Step)	2 August 2021	2 August 2026	2021	23rd	Civil Contract
16	Nikol Pashinyan (born 1975)		Civil Contract (Yelk / My Step)	2 August 2026	Incumbent	2026	24th	Civil Contract

== Notes ==
α. Assassinated while in office in the 1999 Armenian parliament shooting.

β. Died of heart attack while in office.
