= Abrahamyan government =

Government of Armenia

Government of Hovik Abrahamyan
- 13th government of Armenia

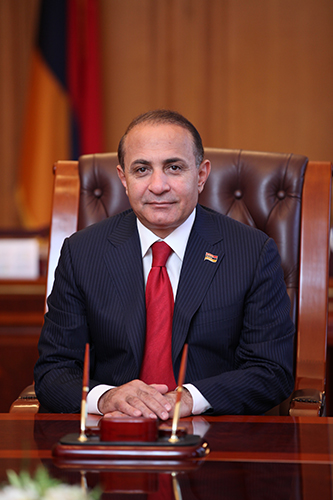
- Hovik Abrahamyan (2012)
- Date established: April 2014
- Date dissolved: 27 September 2016

Leadership and composition
- Head of state: Serzh Sargsyan
- Head of government: Hovik Abrahamyan
- Deputy: Vache Gabrielyan
- No. of ministers: 18
- Member parties: Republican Party; Prosperous Armenia; Rule of Law Party; ARF
- Status in legislature: Coalition
- Opposition parties: ANC; Heritage

Formation and history
- Predecessor: Tigran Sargsyan government
- Successor: Karapetyan government

Abrahamyan's government was the governing body of Armenia from April 2014 to September 2016. Hovik Abrahamyan was designated Prime Minister by President Serzh Sargsyan in April 2014.

It was a coalition government formed by Republican Party, Prosperous Armenia, Rule of Law party and ARF.

The cabinet consisted of eighteen ministries and eight adjunct bodies. Each ministry is responsible for elaborating and implementing governmental decisions in its respective sphere.

== Structure ==
=== Ministries ===
The government of Armenia is led by Hovik Abrahamyan, who took the office in April 2014. The government of Armenia consists of eighteen ministries and has six adjunct bodies. Each ministry is responsible for elaborating and implementing the governmental decisions in its respective sphere.

Main office-holders
Office	Name	Party	Since
Prime Minister	Hovik Abrahamyan	Republican Party	April 2014
Ministry of Defence	Seyran Ohanyan	Non-party	14 April 2008
Ministry of International Economic Integration and Reforms	Vache Gabrielyan	Republican Party	28 November 2014
Ministry of Agriculture	Sergo Karapetyan	Non-party	31 December 2010
Ministry of Culture	Hasmik Poghosyan	Non-party	1 June 2007
Ministry of Diaspora	Hranush Hakobyan	Republican Party	1 October 2008
Ministry of Economy	Artsvik Minasyan	Armenian Revolutionary Federation	24 February 2016
Ministry of Nature Protection	Aramayis Grigoryan	Non-party	30 June 2014
Ministry of Education and Science	Levon Mkrtchyan	Armenian Revolutionary Federation	24 February 2016
Ministry of Energy and Natural Resources	Levon Yolyan	Non-party	29 February 2016
Ministry of Finance	Gagik Khachatryan	Non-party	26 April 2014
Ministry of Foreign Affairs	Eduard Nalbandyan	Non-party	15 April 2008
Ministry of Healthcare	Armen Muradyan	Non-party	23 April 2014
Ministry of Justice	Arpine Hovhannisyan	Republican Party	4 September 2015
Ministry of Labor and Social Affairs	Artem Asatryan	Republican Party	16 June 2012
Ministry of Sport and Youth Affairs	Gabriel Ghazaryan	Non-party	3 May 2014
Ministry of Territorial Administration and Development	Davit Lokyan	Armenian Revolutionary Federation	24 February 2016
Ministry of Emergency Situations	Armen Yeritsyan	Non-partisan	24 February 2016
Ministry of Transport and Communication	Gagik Beglaryan	Republican Party	16 June 2012
Ministry of Urban Development	Narek Sargsyan	non-party	23 April 2014

=== Adjunct bodies ===
The role of adjunct bodies is to elaborate, implement and administer governmental decision in respective sphere. Similar to ministries, adjunct bodies are subordinate to Prime Minister. There are six adjunct bodies to Armenian government.

Adjunct body	Head	Since in office	Party
General Department of Civil Aviation	Artyom Movsesyan	4 May 2004	Non-party
National Security Service	Georgi Kutoyan	12 February 2016	---
State Nuclear Safety Regulatory Committee by the Government	Ashot Martirosyan	17 September 2008	Non-party
Police	Vladimir Gasparyan	1 November 2011	---
State Committee of the Real Estate Cadastre	Martin Sargsyan	3 June 2014	RPA
State Property Management Department	Arman Sahakyan	22 June 2011	RPA
State Revenue Committee	Hovhannes Hovsepyan	3 March 2016	RPA
