= Vache Gabrielyan =

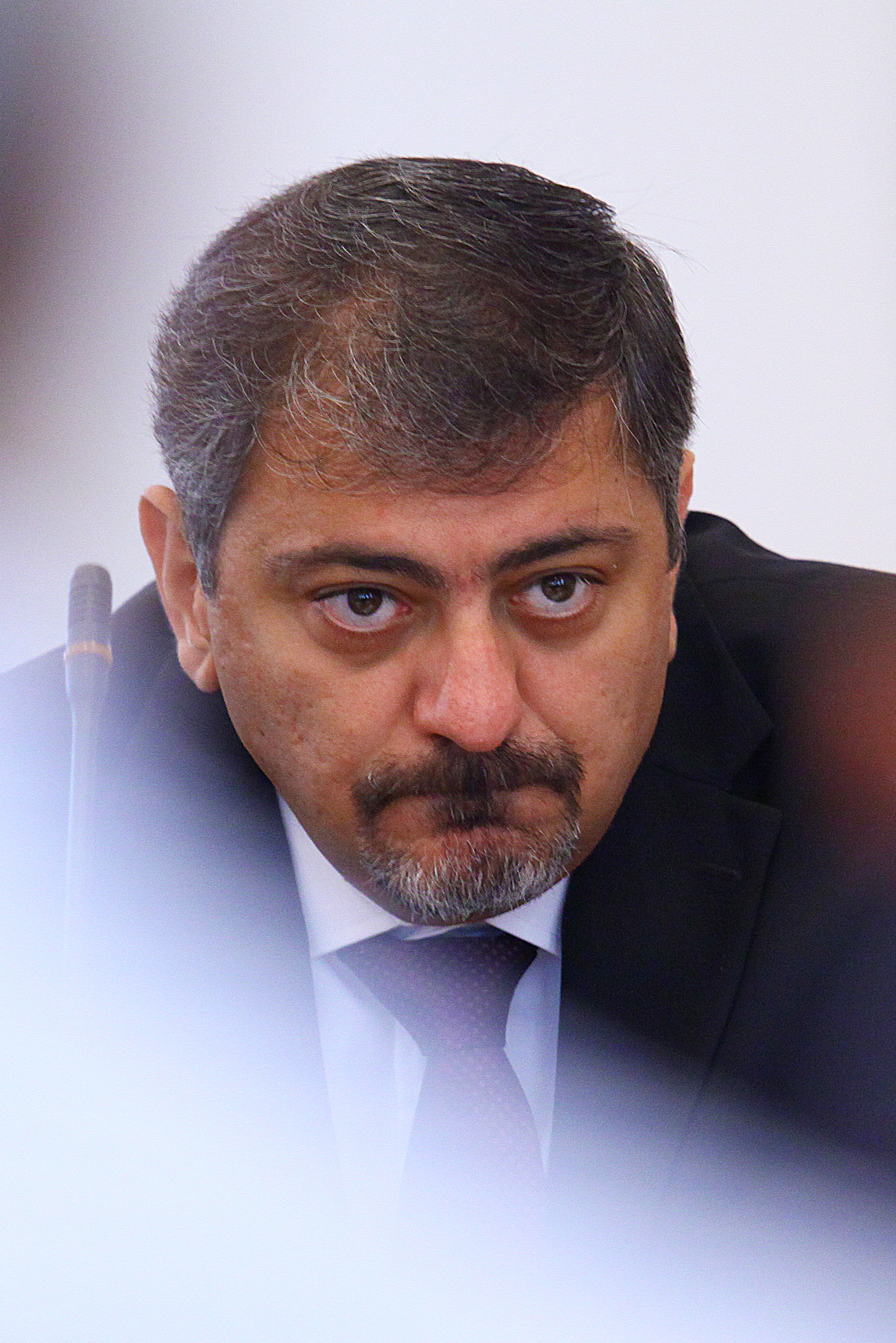

Deputy Prime Minister of Armenia
- In office November 28, 2014 – May 11, 2018
- Prime Minister: Hovik Abrahamyan; Karen Karapetyan; Serzh Sargsyan; Karen Karapetyan (acting)
- Succeeded by: Ararat Mirzoyan; Tigran Avinyan; Mher Grigoryan

Personal details
- Born: November 24, 1968 (age 57) Yerevan, Armenian SSR, USSR
- Party: Republican Party of Armenia
- Education: Yerevan State University Rutgers University

Vache Vazgeni Gabrielyan (Armenian: Վաչե Վազգենի Գաբրիելյան; born November 24, 1968) is the Dean of the College of Business and Economics at the American University of Armenia. Previously, he served as the Deputy Prime Minister of Armenia and the Minister for International Economic Integration and Reforms from 2014 to 2018.

== Early career ==
Vache Gabrielyan started his career in public service in 1990 as a staff member in the Armenian Parliament. After completion of his studies in the United States, he held various positions in the Central Bank of Armenia, where from 2008 to 2010 he acted as the Vice-Governor.

== In government ==
For the succeeding three years (2010–2013) he headed the Ministry of Finance of Armenia. As the Minister of Finance of Armenia, Gabrielyan initiated a number of reforms and contributed to fostering relationships with international institutions, particularly in his position as the country Governor for the International Monetary Fund.

After leaving the office of the Finance Minister, Vache Gabrielyan from 2013 to 2014 acted as the Chief of Staff of the Government of Armenia. Prior taking the Deputy Prime Minister Office in 2014, he served as the Chief Adviser to the Prime Minister of Armenia. Vache Gabrielyan since serves as the Armenian Governor for the World Bank, Asian Development Bank and European Bank for Reconstruction and Development.

Gabrielyan holds a Ph.D. in Public Administration from Rutgers University and honorary diploma from the Yerevan State University's Economic Cybernetics Department (RA, 1985–1992).

== Post government ==
Since 1999, Gabrielyan has taught at the American University of Armenia, and has lectured for more than a decade at the Yerevan State University. Gabrielyan is the author of а number of scientific papers, articles and books published in Armenia and abroad.

== Awards ==
- 2nd degree Medal "For Services to the Fatherland" (December 29, 2014)
- Souvenir of the Prime Minister of the Republic of Armenia (2014)

== Family ==
He is married and has two children. He is the son of literary critics Vazgen Gabrielyan and Zhenya Kalantaryan, and the brother of Ambassador Vahe Gabrielyan.
