= Tigran Avinyan =

Armenian politician

- Տիգրան Ավինյան
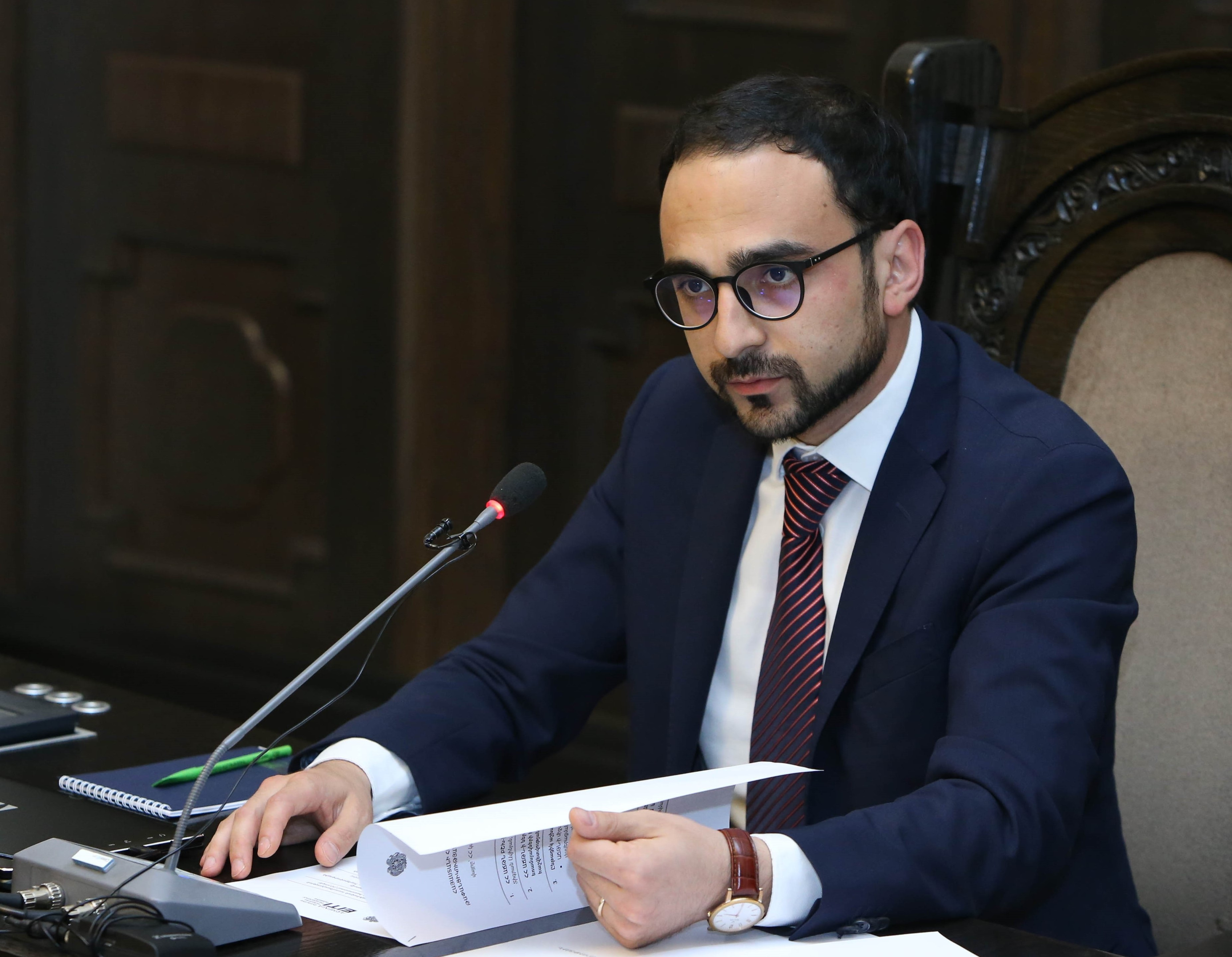
- Avinyan in 2019

Mayor of Yerevan
- Incumbent
- Assumed office 10 October 2023
- Preceded by: Hrachya Sargsyan

Deputy Mayor of Yerevan
- In office 23 September 2022 – 10 October 2023

Deputy Prime Minister of Armenia
- In office 11 May 2018 – 2 August 2021 Serving with Mher Grigoryan
- Prime Minister: Nikol Pashinyan
- Preceded by: Armen Gevorgyan; Vache Gabrielyan
- Succeeded by: Suren Papikyan

Personal details
- Born: 28 February 1989 (age 37) Yerevan, Armenian SSR, Soviet Union
- Party: Civil Contract
- Children: 3
- Education: Russian-Armenian University; Queen Mary University of London

Tigran Avinyan (Armenian: Տիգրան Ավինյան; born 28 February 1989) is an Armenian politician and businessman currently serving as the Mayor of Yerevan. He served as Deputy Prime Minister of Armenia from 2018 to 2021 in Nikol Pashinyan's government. He is a founding member of the ruling Civil Contract Party. He was the Civil Contract Party's mayoral candidate for the Yerevan City Council election which took place on 17 September 2023. Avinyan was elected as Mayor of Yerevan on 10 October 2023.

== Biography ==
Avinyan was born on 28 February 1989 in Yerevan. He studied applied mathematics at the Russian-Armenian University, receiving his bachelor's degree in 2009 and his master's degree in 2011. In 2014, he received a master's degree in finance from Queen Mary University of London. In the following years, he worked at various companies in the banking and technological sectors in Armenia. From 2014 to 2018, he was the head of the software company Cyber Vision. Avinyan participated in the four-day hostilities between Armenian and Azerbaijani forces in Nagorno-Karabakh, for which he received a commendation from the Ministry of Defense.

Avinyan co-founded the Civil Contract Party in 2014. In 2016, he was elected a member of the board of the party. From 2017 to 2018, he served on the Yerevan City Council as a member of the Way Out Alliance. Avinyan participated in the 2018 Armenian revolution and was arrested during the protests. After the resignation of Prime Minister Serzh Sargsyan and the formation of an interim government led by Nikol Pashinyan, Avinyan was appointed Deputy Prime Minister of Armenia. At age 29, he was the youngest person to ever hold this post. He held this position until August 2021, when he resigned, citing his dissatisfaction with the party's list of candidates for the 2021 snap parliamentary election.

In 2019, he became the chairman of the board of directors of the state-owned enterprise State Interests Fund of Armenia. In 2021, he became the chairman of the board of trustees of the Renewable Energy and Energy Saving Fund of Armenia. In 2022, he became a member of the board of Armbusinessbank. Since 2022, he has served as the chairman of the board of trustees of the National Polytechnic University of Armenia. On 23 September 2022, he was appointed the deputy mayor of Yerevan. Avinyan has effectively acted as mayor of Yerevan since the resignation of acting mayor Hrachya Sargsyan in March 2023. He was the Civil Contract Party's candidate for the Yerevan mayoral election, which took place on 17 September 2023. Following the election, Civil Contract won 24 seats in the Yerevan City Council and Avinyan was elected as Mayor of Yerevan on 10 October 2023.

== Controversies ==
In October 2018, Avinyan came under scrutiny after the investigative news site Hetq reported that a fruit-drying company founded by him had received a $35,000 grant from the state-owned Agricultural Development Fund at a time when Avinyan already occupied the post of deputy prime minister. Avinyan denied any wrongdoing, stating that the company began the grant application process months before he was appointed to the position.

In May 2023, journalist Davit Sargsyan of the newspaper 168 Zham conducted a report alleging that Avinyan and his family have been "steadily getting richer" since Nikol Pashinyan became prime minister in 2018 and detailing the alleged business interests of Avinyan's family. Avinyan sued the newspaper, seeking compensation for slander. An Armenian court ruled to freeze 18 million drams ($46,000) worth of assets belonging to 168 Zham and Davit Sargsyan. The lawsuit was condemned by Sargsyan as an attempt to silence him. It was also criticized by press freedom groups.

In June 2023, criminal proceedings were initiated after the Corruption Prevention Commission of Armenia submitted materials regarding Avinyan to the Office of the General Prosecutor of Armenia. At issue is the question of whether it is a violation of public service laws for Avinyan to hold the position of Deputy Mayor of Yerevan and the position of chairman of the board of the State Interests Fund of Armenia at the same time. An investigation is currently being conducted by the Investigative Committee of Armenia; according to the General Prosecutor's Office, criminal prosecution has not been initiated against any person in connection with the case.

In July 2023, the civic group Union of Informed Citizens alleged that the Civil Contract Party and local government officials were abusing administrative resources in support of Avinyan's mayoral campaign. Specifically, it was alleged that Civil Contract vice chairman Gevorg Papoyan had asked local government officials in the Spitak community to draw up lists of Spitak-born residents of Yerevan, whom they would persuade to vote for Avinyan.

== Personal life ==
Avinyan is married with three daughters.

Political offices
| Preceded by Hrachya Sargsyan | Mayor of Yerevan; 2023–present | Incumbent |
