= Tigran Khachatryan =

Armenian economist and former deputy prime minister

- Տիգրան Խաչատրյան
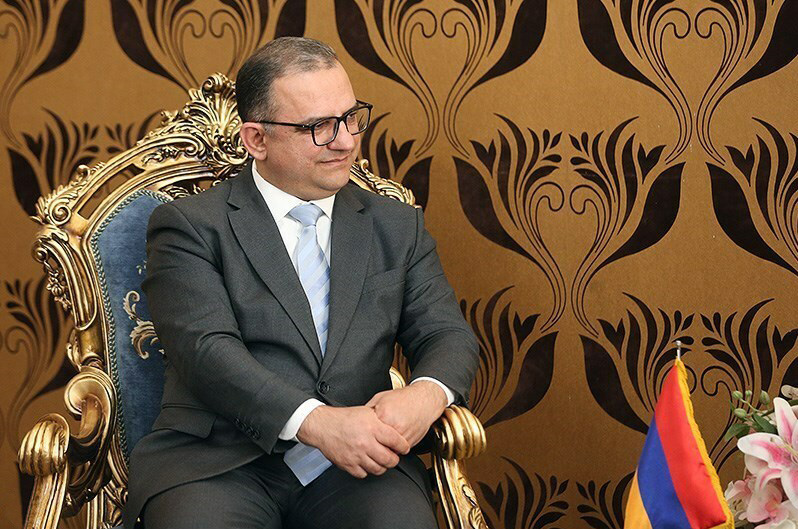

Deputy Prime Minister of Armenia
- Incumbent
- Assumed office 19 December 2022 Serving with Tigran Avinyan and Mher Grigoryan
- Prime Minister: Nikol Pashinyan
- Preceded by: Hambardzum Matevosyan

Personal details
- Born: December 11, 1970 (age 55) Yerevan, Armenian SSR, Soviet Union
- Party: Independent
- Children: 3
- Education: Yerevan State University of Economics

Tigran Khachatryan (Armenian: Տիգրան Խաչատրյան; born 11 December 1970) is an Armenian politician currently serving as the Deputy Prime Minister of Armenia.

== Early life and education ==
He was born on December 11, 1970, in Yerevan. From 1987 to 1992, studied at the Faculty of Labor Economics of the Yerevan Institute of National Economy. He did his postgraduate studies in economic management at the Institute of Economics of the Armenian National Academy of Sciences from 1993 to 1996. At the end of his studies, he briefly studied applied market economics at the Joint Vienna Institute.

== Public service and business activity ==
From 1995, he worked as a leading specialist of the Ministry of Economy, then as Chief Economist of the Ministry of Finance. For the next five years, he headed various sub-ministerial departments of the two ministries, such as State Budget Revenue Department, the Tax Policy Department, and the General Department of State Revenue Policy. In 2001, President Robert Kocharyan made him Deputy Minister of Finance and Economy.

In 2006, he went into the private sector. From 2006 to 2016, he was a financial director at the Vallex Group of Companies. From 2008 to 2014, he was member of the board of the Armenian Development Agency. In 2016, he was a member of the board of the Pan-Armenian Bank.

== Government ==
From 2016 to 2018, he was Deputy Minister of Economic Development and Investments. In March 2018, she was promoted to First Deputy Minister. Later that year, in September, he served as Director of Hi-Tech Armenia Company. A month later, he became Minister of Economic Development and Investments. On June 1, 2019, he was appointed Minister of Economy. From August 3, 2021, to December 19, 2022, he served as Minister of Finance. On December 19, 2022, he was appointed Deputy Prime Minister of Armenia by President Vahagn Khachaturyan, replacing Hambardzum Matevosyan.

== Personal life ==
He is married and has two sons and a daughter. He is fluent in English and Russian.
