= Armen Amiryan =

Armenian writer

- Արմեն Ամիրյան
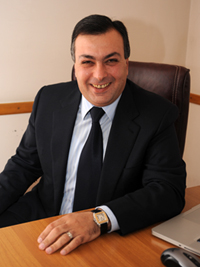
- Born: 29 July 1967 (age 58); Yerevan, Armenia
- Education: 1984-1991, Armenian State Pedagogical University after Khachatur Abovyan, Faculty of Culture
- Organization(s): Public Radio of Armenia; Ar Radio Intercontinental
- Title: Associate Professor; Head of TV-Radio Journalism Chair

Armen Artavazdi Amiryan (Armenian: Արմեն Արտավազդի Ամիրյան) is an associate professor, a TV host, a director and a writer. On 21 September 2015, he was awarded the title of Honored Worker of Culture of Armenia. Worked as the Minister of Culture of Armenia until his resignation on 2 May 2018.
