= Davit Harutyunyan =

Armenian politician

Minister of Justice Armenia
- In office 1998–2007

Deputy minister of justice
- In office 1997–1998

Personal details
- Born: March 5, 1963 (age 63) Yerevan, Armenian SSR, Soviet Union

Davit Harutyunyan (Armenian: Դավիթ Հարությունյան; born March 5, 1963, in Yerevan) is an Armenian politician who served as the deputy Minister of Justice from 1997 to 1998, and as Minister of Justice from 1998 to 2007. He was first elected to the Armenian parliament in 1995.

In 2006, Forbes magazine listed him as the 10th-richest person in Armenia.
