= Armen Gevorgyan =

Armenian politician

Deputy Prime Minister of Armenia
- In office 17 April 2018 – 23 April 2018 Serving with Vache Gabrielyan
- Prime Minister: Serzh Sargsyan
- Succeeded by: Ararat Mirzoyan

Secretary of the Security Council of Armenia
- In office 6 June 2007 – February 2008
- Preceded by: Serzh Sargsyan
- Succeeded by: Artur Baghdasaryan

Personal details
- Born: July 8, 1973 (age 52) Armenian SSR, USSR
- Party: Republican Party of Armenia
- Religion: Armenian Apostolic Church

Armen Gevorgyan (Armenian: Արմեն Անդրանիկի Գևորգյան; born 8 July 1973) is a former Deputy Prime Minister of Armenia.
