= Mher Grigoryan =

Armenian lawyer, vice prime minister

- Մհեր Գրիգորյան
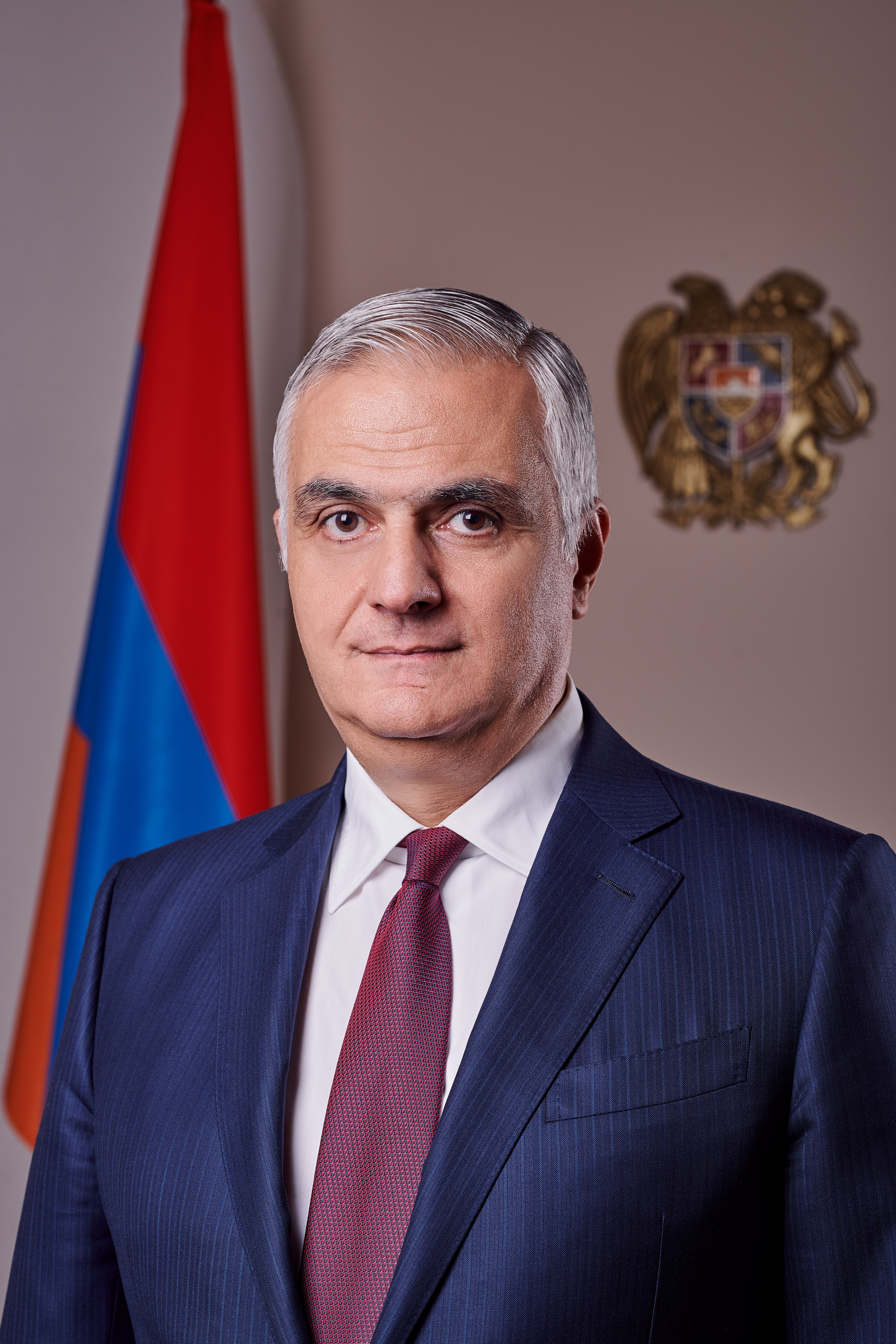
- Official portrait, 2020

Deputy Prime Minister of Armenia
- Incumbent
- Assumed office 12 May 2018 Serving with Tigran Avinyan and Tigran Khachatryan
- Prime Minister: Nikol Pashinyan
- Preceded by: Armen Gevorgyan; Vache Gabrielyan

Personal details
- Born: 15 February 1972 (age 54) Ashtarak, Armenian SSR, Soviet Union
- Party: Independent
- Children: 2
- Education: Yerevan State University

Mher Herberti Grigoryan (Armenian: Մհեր Հերբերտի Գրիգորյան; born 15 February 1972) is an Armenian politician currently serving as the Deputy Prime Minister of Armenia.

== Biography ==
=== Education ===
Mher Grigoryan studied law at Moscow State University from 1989 to 1991. He continued his education at Yerevan State University, where he studied law from 1991 to 1994. From 1997 to 1998 he took a qualification course at Leeds University Business School.

=== Work experience ===
From 1994 to 1996 he was a private entrepreneur in the Russian Federation. In 1997, he started his career in the Central Bank of Armenia (CBA). From 1997 to 1999 he was the Head of the Legal Department of the CBA. He then continued his career in Armimpexbank (now Ameriabank), where from 1999 to 2005 he was the Head of Legal Service and Operational Director. Simultaneously, he provided advisory services to the World Bank from 2002 to 2006. He was a legal officer in the HSBC Bank from 2004 to 2005 and became the Executive Director of Inecobank in 2005, a position he held until 2007. From 2007 to 2011 Grigoryan was the Deputy CEO of VTB Bank Armenia. From 2006 to 2018 he was also a member of the board of ArCa Credit Reporting. He became the Chairman and CEO of Ardshinbank in 2011 and continued his career in this position until 2018. He was also the chairman of the board of Armenia Insurance Company from 2012 to 2018.

=== Political career ===
On 12 May 2018, Grigoryan was appointed the deputy prime minister of Armenia. Following the resignation of the Government on 16 October 2018, he became acting deputy prime minister of Armenia and on 16 January 2019, he was reappointed to the post of Deputy Prime Minister of Armenia.

Since January 2021, Grigoryan has represented Armenia in the trilateral working group of deputy prime ministers of Russia, Armenia and Azerbaijan for the restoration of transport links between Armenia and Azerbaijan as stipulated by the 2020 Nagorno-Karabakh ceasefire agreement.

== Personal life ==
Grigoryan is married and has a son and a daughter.

== Awards ==
- In 2026, by the RA Presidential Decree, on the occasion of the Republic Day, awarded with the 1st Degree Order “For Services to the Motherland” for outstanding services to the Homeland, many years of tireless work and dedication
- By the Decision of the Supreme Eurasian Economic Council of December 26, 2024, awarded the Medal '10 Years of the Eurasian Economic Union'
- By the Decision of the Supreme Eurasian Economic Council of December 9, 2022, awarded the Medal for Contribution to the Development of the Eurasian Economic Union
- In 2017, by the RA Presidential Decree, on the occasion of the Independence Day of the Republic of Armenia, awarded with “Anania Shirakatsi” Medal for valuable contribution to the development of the economy
- In 2016, by NKR Presidential Decree, awarded with “Anania Shirakatsi” Medal for valuable contribution to the development of the economy
