= Karen Karapetyan =

Prime Minister of Armenia from 2016 to 2018

- Կարեն Կարապետյան
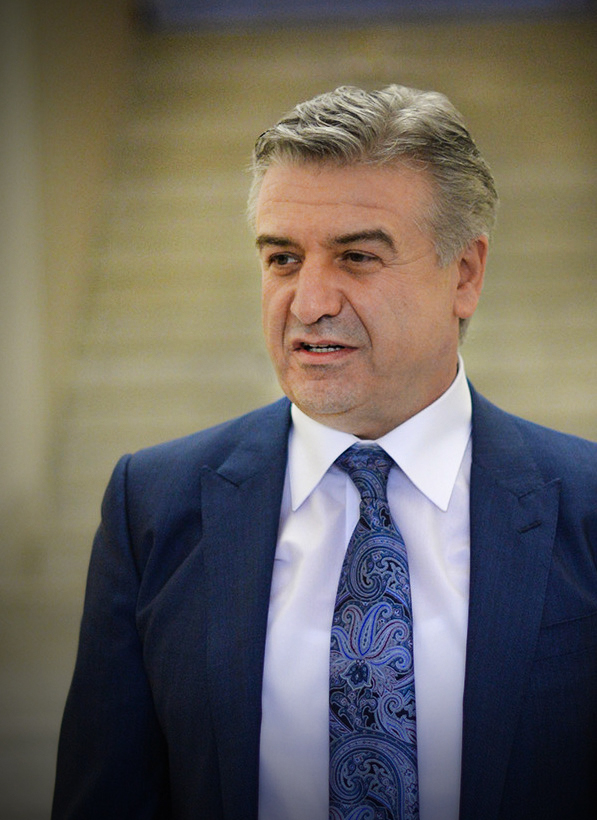
- Karapetyan in 2018

14th Prime Minister of Armenia
- Acting; 23 April 2018 – 8 May 2018
- President: Armen Sarkissian
- Preceded by: Serzh Sargsyan
- Succeeded by: Nikol Pashinyan
- In office 13 September 2016 – 17 April 2018 (Note: Acting: 9–17 April 2018)
- President: Serzh Sargsyan; Armen Sarkissian
- Preceded by: Hovik Abrahamyan
- Succeeded by: Serzh Sargsyan

First Deputy Prime Minister of Armenia
- In office 18 April 2018 – 8 May 2018
- Prime Minister: Serzh Sargsyan
- Preceded by: Position established
- Succeeded by: Ararat Mirzoyan

Mayor of Yerevan
- In office 17 December 2010 – 15 November 2011
- Preceded by: Gagik Beglaryan
- Succeeded by: Taron Margaryan

Personal details
- Born: Karen Vilhelmi Karapetyan; 14 August 1964 (age 62) Stepanakert, Nagorno-Karabakh AO, Azerbaijan SSR, Soviet Union
- Children: 3
- Education: Yerevan State University

Karen Vilhelmi Karapetyan (Armenian: Կարեն Վիլհելմի Կարապետյան; born 14 August 1963) is an Armenian politician who was Prime Minister of Armenia from September 2016 until April 2018. He was previously Mayor of Yerevan, the capital, from 2010 to 2011. He was appointed prime minister by President Serzh Sargsyan on 13 September 2016 and held office until 9 April 2018. Karapetyan served as first deputy prime minister from 17 April to 23 April 2018, when he was appointed acting prime minister following the resignation of Prime Minister Serzh Sargsyan. He held this position until the election of Nikol Pashinyan as prime minister on 8 May 2018.

== Early life and career ==
Karen Karapetyan was born on 14 August 1964 in Stepanakert, then administrative center of the Nagorno-Karabakh Autonomous Oblast․ However, he grew up and was raised in Yerevan. During the 1970s, he studied at Secondary School #128 named after Leo Tolstoy in Yerevan. From 1980 to 1985, he studied and graduated with honors from the Faculty of Applied Mathematics of Yerevan State University. In 1989, he received the degree of candidate of economic sciences. From 1985 to 1996, he worked in the computing center of the State Planning Committee of Armenia, as well as in the Association of Scientists and Cultural Workers and taught at YSU. In 2001, he was appointed Deputy Minister of Energy of Armenia. Karapetyan was also chief executive of the Armenian-Russian joint venture ArmRosGazprom beginning in 2001.

== Mayor of Yerevan (2010–2011) ==
Karapetyan became Mayor of Yerevan on 17 December 2010 after receiving overwhelming support from the municipal assembly. He succeeded Gagik Beglaryan, a controversial mayor who resigned in early December 2010 after being embroiled in a high-profile scandal with the presidential administration of Serzh Sargsyan.

Just one month into his term as mayor, Karapetyan arguably sparked the 2011 Armenian protests when he ordered the municipality to enforce a strict ban on street trading. Angry street vendors took to the streets to call for Karapetyan's resignation and the repeal of the ban. As protests grew larger, with many rallies being held illegally in Yerevan's central Freedom Square, Karapetyan held his ground, insisting that the ban on gatherings in Freedom Square would remain in place and refusing to consider relaxing the municipality's restrictions on street trading.

Karapetyan resigned as Mayor on 28 October 2011 and in November 2011 Taron Margaryan was elected mayor in his place. After his resignation, he returned to Russia to continue working for Gazprom.

== Prime Minister of Armenia (2016–2018) ==
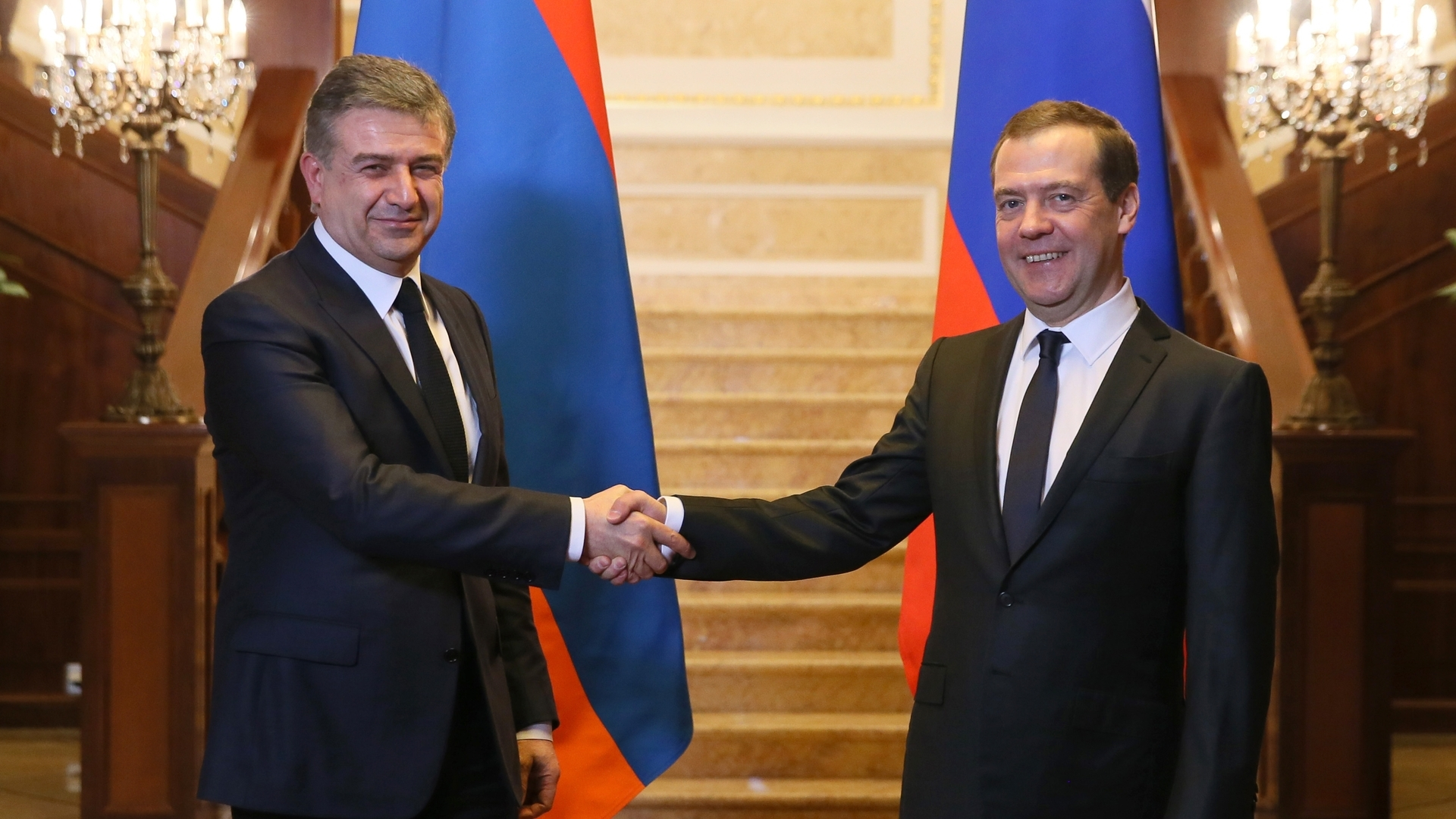
Karapetyan meeting with Russian Prime Minister Dmitry Medvedev on 24 January 2017

After the resignation of Hovik Abrahamyan, Karapetyan was quickly named as a possible successor. This was confirmed during a meeting of the Republican Party of Armenia and officially confirmed by President Serzh Sargsyan on 13 September 2016. It was said that Karapetyan's new Government would bring sweeping changes and reforms to the country and economy. His term ended on 17 April 2018, when former President Serzh Sargsyan was named Prime Minister, in a move that opposition groups denounced as a power grab. After a week of protests, Sargsyan resigned on 23 April, and Karapetyan was named Acting Prime Minister until 8 May, when Nikol Pashinyan was elected new Prime Minister.

== Personal life ==
Karen Karapetyan is married and has three children.

== See also ==
- List of mayors of Yerevan

== Notes ==
Political offices
Preceded by Gagik Beglaryan	Mayor of Yerevan; 2010–2011	Succeeded by Taron Margaryan
Preceded by Hovik Abrahamyan	Prime Minister of Armenia; 2016–2018	Succeeded by Serzh Sargsyan
Preceded by Serzh Sargsyan	Prime Minister of Armenia; Acting; 2018	Succeeded by Nikol Pashinyan
