= Republican Party of Armenia =

Political party in Armenia

Republican Party of Armenia Հայաստանի Հանրապետական Կուսակցություն
- Leader: Serzh Sargsyan
- Spokesperson: Eduard Sharmazanov
- Deputy Leader: Vigen Sargsyan
- Founder: Ashot Navasardyan
- Founded: 2 April 1990
- Split from: Union for National Self-Determination
- Preceded by: Army of Independence
- Headquarters: Yerevan
- Membership: 140,000 (claimed, 2008)
- Ideology: National conservatism; Tseghakronism
- Political position: Right-wing
- National affiliation: Homeland Salvation Movement (2020–2021); I Have Honor Alliance (2021)
- European affiliation: European People's Party (observer)
- International affiliation: Centrist Democrat International
- National Assembly: 0 / 105 (0%)

Website
- hhk.am

The party's seal

The Republican Party of Armenia (RPA, Armenian: Հայաստանի Հանրապետական Կուսակցություն, ՀՀԿ; Hayastani Hanrapetakan Kusakts'ut'yun, HHK) is a national-conservative political party in Armenia led by the third president of Armenia, Serzh Sargsyan.

It was the first political party in independent Armenia to be founded (April 2, 1990) and registered (May 14, 1991). It is the largest party of the right-wing in Armenia, and claims to have had 140,000 members at its heyday. It was the ruling party of Armenia from 1999 to 2018. After the latest parliamentary elections in June 2021, the party entered parliament as a part of the opposition I Have Honor Alliance.

The Economist magazine has described the RPA as a "typical post-Soviet 'party of power' mainly comprising senior government officials, civil servants, and wealthy business people dependent on government connections." It has been described by political commentators as essentially lacking political ideology.

== History ==
=== Establishment and early history ===
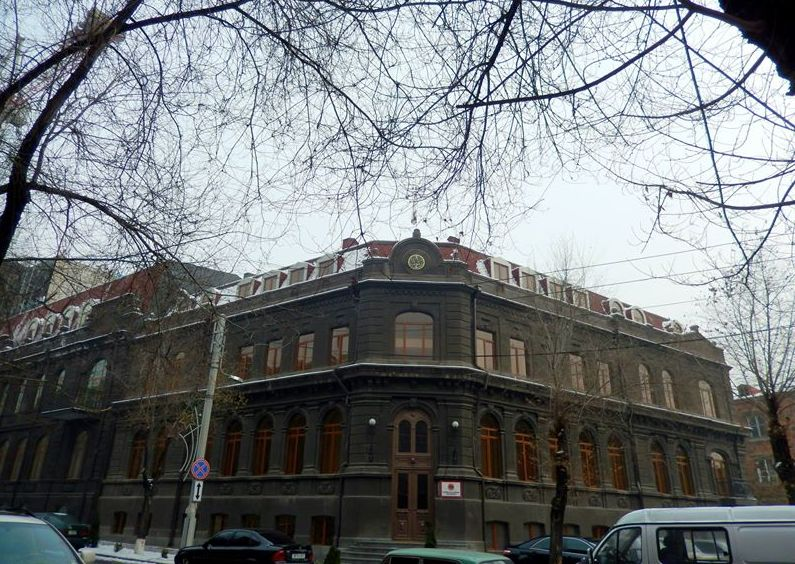
The party headquarters on Melik-Adamyan street in Yerevan

The Republican Party of Armenia was established in 1990 by Ashot Navasardyan. Navasardyan and several other founding members of the RPA were veterans of the National United Party and its successor, the Union for National Self-Determination, which engaged in underground activities aimed at achieving Armenia's independence from the Soviet Union.

The RPA was founded in the context of the national awakening that occurred in Armenia in 1988, the fight for Armenian independence and the struggle for the unification of Artsakh (Nagorno-Karabakh) with Armenia. The armed group known as the Army of Independence (Armenian: Անկախության բանակ), which was founded by Ashot Navasardyan and his comrades in late 1989, became the organizational basis for the establishment of the RPA. On April 2, 1990, a founding council composed of the detachment commanders of the Army of Independence proclaimed the establishment of the Republican Party of Armenia in Yerevan, which became the first officially registered socio-political organization in Armenia (registered on May 14, 1991). Party founder Ashot Navasardyan was elected to the Supreme Soviet (parliament) of Armenia in the 1990 Armenian Supreme Soviet elections.

During the First Nagorno-Karabakh War, first as the Army of Independence and later as detachments composed of RPA members, members of the party actively participated in defense of the borders of Armenia and the hostilities in Artsakh. On May 27, 1990, these detachments were among the first to resist the Soviet troops in Nubarashen. They were also actively involved in seizing Soviet Army weaponry and transferring it to the border regions of Armenia to arm militias fighting Soviet and Azerbaijani forces.

The RPA was among the founders of the first Armenian military cemetery – Yerablur pantheon.

The RPA has convened nine ordinary (in 1992, 1995, 1997, 1999, 2001, 2003, 2005, 2007, 2009) and three extraordinary congresses (in 1996, 2002, and 2006). In 1999 the office of the party chairperson was abolished, and restored later in 2005.

The RPA has constantly focused on inter-party ties and has been actively involved in setting up different political alliances. The party was among the founders of the National Alliance formed in 1992 after the deterioration of the situation in Artsakh. The RPA actively participated in the work of the Civil Accord constitutional council formed in 1993.

In 1995, the RPA joined the Republican Bloc electoral coalition with the ruling Pan-Armenian National Movement party and two other parties to run in the 1995 Armenian parliamentary elections. However, due to the disagreements on the Nagorno-Karabakh issue, the RPA left the Republican Bloc in February 1998.

The party was led by Ashot Navasardyan from its foundation until his death in November 1997. After his death and until March 2007, Andranik Margaryan headed the party.

=== Ruling party ===
In July 1998 the RPA issued a joint statement with the powerful Yerkrapah Volunteers' Union and the latter's faction in parliamentary, which commenced the process of political consolidation within the RPA. The politically active wing of the Yerkrapah Volunteers’ Union united with the Republican Party. Vazgen Sargsyan, Armenia's influential defense minister and chairman of the Yerkrapah Volunteer's Union, became the party leader. In 1999 the Republican Party set up the Unity electoral alliance with Karen Demirchyan's People's Party of Armenia. The Unity Bloc won a majority of seats in the 1999 parliamentary elections.

Following the parliamentary elections in 1999 the role of the RPA in the Armenian political life increased greatly. While the RPA was represented by only one member (Ashot Navasardyan) in the Supreme Soviet (parliament) formed in 1990 and won five seats in the National Assembly in the 1995 elections, after the 1999 elections the RPA was the largest party in parliament with 30 MPs. Functioning within the ruling Unity Bloc, the RPA was enabled to participate in forming the government of Armenia for the first time in 1999. Vazgen Sargsyan was appointed prime minister, with several RPA members appointed to ministerial positions in his cabinet.

Following the assassination of Vazgen Sargsyan in the 1999 Armenian parliament shooting, RPA representative Aram Sargsyan (brother of Vazgen Sargsyan) was appointed prime minister. Later, in May 2000, Andranik Margaryan, chairman of the RPA council and the leader of the Unity Bloc in parliament, was appointed prime minister. In 2001, Aram Sargsyan and several other former members of the RPA founded the Hanrapetutyun (Republic) Party.

The RPA published an official newspaper, Hanrapetakan ("The Republican"). Claiming allegiance to the nationalist ideology of Armenian military leader and thinker Garegin Nzhdeh, the RPA's has made various publications Nzhdeh's life, work and the ideologies related to him, Tseghakronism and Taronism, including the book series The Nationalist. In 2001, on the initiative of Prime Minister Andranik Margaryan, Garegin Nzhdeh's 115th anniversary was celebrated at the state level.

The RPA increased its number of seats in parliament to 40 in the 2003 parliamentary elections, again becoming the largest faction in parliament. In 2003, as a result of negotiations, the three political forces supporting President of Armenia Robert Kocharyan—the Republican Party of Armenia, the Armenian Revolutionary Federation and the Rule of Law Party (Orinats Yerkir)—formed a parliamentary coalition. Andranik Margaryan continued to head the Armenian government, with seven ministers nominated by the RPA. The deputy speaker of parliament and three out of the six chairpersons of parliamentary standing committees were also elected from the Republican Party.

In May 2006 the Rule of Law Party left the parliamentary majority, and the National Assembly was subject to rearrangements of political forces, which resulted in RPA Chairman Tigran Torosyan becoming the Speaker of the Parliament.

The RPA 10th extraordinary congress of July 2006 proclaimed the Republican Party of Armenia a national conservative party. The congress decided to restore the office of the party council chairperson, which had been abolished in 2005. Serzh Sargsyan was elected the chairperson of the RPA Council.

On March 25, 2007, the RPA chairman Andranik Margaryan died, and the council chairman Serzh Sargsyan assumed the duties of the RPA chairman. On April 4, 2007, Serzh Sargsyan was appointed prime minister.

The RPA won 33.9% of the vote in the 2007 Armenian parliamentary elections. The RPA parliamentary faction was formed with 64 MPs. RPA Vice Chairman Tigran Torosyan was elected Speaker of the Parliament. The Republican Party signed a coalition memorandum with the Prosperous Armenia Party, and a memorandum of cooperation with the Armenian Revolutionary Federation.

On 10 November 2007 the 11th ordinary congress of the RPA was held, and some amendments to the Charter were made. The office of the party council chairperson was abolished, and the RPA Executive body was elected as the permanently functioning governing body, while the RPA Council was elected as the party's representative body. Serzh Sargsyan was elected RPA chairman.

Serzh Sargsyan was elected President of Armenia in the controversial 2008 Armenian presidential elections. The Republican Party of Armenia, the Prosperous Armenia Party, the Armenian Revolutionary Federation and the Rule of Law Party signed a coalition agreement, and a government was formed with Tigran Sargsyan as prime minister.

At the 12th congress of the RPA held in November 2009 RA President Serzh Sargsyan was re-elected as party chairman.

The party scored well in the 2012 parliamentary election, winning 69 seats and retaining its absolute majority.

=== Cancellation of EU Association Agreement ===
The government led by the Republican Party, concluded negotiations for an Association Agreement which included a Deep and Comprehensive Free Trade Area with the European Union in July 2013. However, in September 2013, the party led by Serzh Sargsyan suddenly decided not to sign the agreement and declared that Armenia would instead join the Russian-led Eurasian Economic Union. Despite not signing an Association Agreement with the EU, the party insists that it does support developing closer political and economic relations with the EU, as well as maintaining strong relations with both Russia and the United States. Other political parties criticized the government's last-minute decision to cancel the Association Agreement with the EU and vocally opposed Armenia's membership in the Eurasian Economic Union. Many criticized Russia for pressuring Sargsyan to abandon the deal with the EU.

=== Velvet Revolution and loss of power ===
The 2017 parliamentary election saw another victory for the Republican Party, winning 58 seats of 105. Soon after the election, a coalition government was formed together with the Armenian Revolutionary Federation.

In April 2018, Prime Minister Karen Karapetyan resigned and former president Serzh Sargsyan was proposed by the RPA as prime minister, despite Sargsyan's promises not to become Armenia's new leader following the end of his presidency. The move sparked mass protests in the country, starting the so-called Velvet Revolution.

The National Assembly approved Sargsyan as the new prime minister on 16 April 2018, causing furious protests in the streets of Yerevan. On 23 April, Sargsyan resigned from his post, while on 25 April the Armenian Revolutionary Federation withdrew from the government coalition and went into opposition. Karen Karapetyan was appointed as acting prime minister.

On 8 May 2018, opposition leader Nikol Pashinyan was elected prime minister by the National Assembly and formed a coalition government comprising all political forces (Tsarukyan Alliance, Way Out Alliance and the Armenian Revolutionary Federation) except the Republican Party of Armenia, which thus went into opposition.

The 2018 snap election saw the collapse of the Republican Party of Armenia, which only scored 4.7% of the votes and lost all political representation in the National Assembly for the first time since Armenia's independence.

=== 2020–2021 Armenian protests ===
On 9 November 2020, the party signed a joint declaration with the other member parties of the Homeland Salvation Movement calling on Prime Minister Nikol Pashinyan to resign during the 2020–2021 Armenian protests.

In May 2021, the Republican Party of Armenia and the Homeland Party announced that they would form their own political alliance, known as the I Have Honor Alliance, to run in the 2021 snap parliamentary elections. Following the election, the alliance received 5.22% of the popular vote, gaining 6 seats in the National Assembly.

== Ideology ==
The Republican Party's national-conservative ideology is based on tseghakron, an early 20th-century Armenian nationalist ideology (roughly translated as "nation-religion"). It was formulated by Garegin Nzhdeh and holds that the Armenian national identity and state should carry religious significance for all ethnic Armenians. "Tseghakron" literally means "carrier of race", referring to those who represent and carry what is the spiritual and biological essence of the "classical" Armenian. However, it is often erroneously interpreted to mean "race-religion".

== Allegations of political corruption ==
Most of Armenia's so-called "oligarchs" (government-connected entrepreneurs who enjoy de facto monopoly on lucrative forms of economic activity) are affiliated with the RPA.

In an RPA congress held in Yerevan in November 2007, then Prime Minister and presidential candidate Serge Sargsyan acknowledged that bribery, nepotism, and other corrupt practices are widespread in Armenia. "Tax evasion and corruption must be regarded as a disgraceful and condemnable phenomenon," said Sargsyan. "We must not take into account family ties and friendship and must not regard as friends and supporters those people who will avoid paying taxes and tolerate this vicious phenomenon." However, his opponents have long accused him of sponsoring the oligarchs enjoying the economic kickbacks.

=== RPA-affiliated oligarchs ===
RPA-affiliated entrepreneurs who enjoy de facto monopolies in Armenia include:

- Samvel Aleksanyan (Lfik Samo), a former member of parliament with close ties to former President Robert Kocharyan and former President Serzh Sargsyan, whose Salex Group has a monopoly on imports of sugar, flour, cooking oil, butter and other basic foodstuffs. Aleksanyan has been accused of hiding his true income, declaring his income for 2015 was 10 million AMD in addition to his 6.2 million AMD salary as an MP. His wife Shogherina Mkrtchyan declared her cash assets for 2016 as 3.7 billion AMD and 8.8 million US dollars, and had purchased property at over 4 million US dollars. The Aleksanyan family also owns the Yerevan City supermarket chain.
- Aleksandr Sargsyan (Sashik), brother of President Serzh Sargsyan and former member of parliament who has a fifty percent stake in Multi Lion, Armenia's leading supplier of liquefied gas to households, cars and buses (the other fifty percent is owned by Gagik Tsarukyan's Multi Group).
- Ruben Hayrapetyan (Nemets Rubo), a former parliament member with close ties to former President Robert Kocharyan and former President Serzh Sargsyan. Ruben Hayrapetyan resigned from parliament in June 2012 following the controversial death of an army doctor, Vahe Avetyan, at a restaurant owned by him. Hayrapetyan served as the President of the Football Federation of Armenia from 2002 to 2018.
- Mher Sedrakyan (Tokhmakhi Mher), a former member of parliament.

=== RPA official accused in corruption ===
In September 2008, the Audit Chamber of Armenia accused Suren Khachatryan, governor of the southeastern Syunik Province, and government officials subordinated to him of embezzling 575 million drams (US$1.9 million) worth of public funds and property. Khachatryan claims he is innocent.

== Election results ==
Election	Votes	%	Seats	+/–	Position	Government
1995 (Note: Run within Republic Bloc.)	329,000	43.9	1 / 190	Steady	1st	Government
1999 (Note: Run within Unity Bloc.)	448,133	41.3	24 / 131	▲23	1st	Government
2003	278,712	23.7	33 / 131	▲9	1st	Government
2007	458,258	33.9	64 / 131	▲31	1st	Government
2012	664,440	44.0	69 / 131	▲5	1st	Government
2017	771,247	49.2	58 / 105	▼11	1st	Government (2017-18)
2017	771,247	49.2	58 / 105	▼11	1st	Opposition (2018–19)
2018	59,059	4.7	0 / 132	▼58	▼4th	Extra-parliamentary
2021 (Note: Run within I Have Honor Alliance.)	66,650	5.22	4 / 107	▲4	▲3rd	Opposition
2026	endorsed the opposition to the Pashinyan government					

=== Presidential elections ===
Year	Candidate	Votes	%	Position
1991	Ashot Navasardyan		0.16%	6
1996	did not participate			
1998	did not participate			
2003	endorsed Robert Kocharyan			
2008	Serzh Sargsyan	862,369	52.82%	1
2013	Serzh Sargsyan	861,160	58.64%	1
2018	endorsed Armen Sarkissian			
2022	did not participate			

== See also ==
- Politics of Armenia
- Programs of political parties in Armenia
