= List of labor and social affairs ministers of Armenia =

This is a list of ministers of social protection of Armenia (Armenian: Հայաստանի աշխատանքի և սոցիալական հարցերի նախարարներ).

== Background ==
In 1990, Armenia's Ministry for Social Security was reorganised into the Ministry of Labour and Social Security. On February 28, 2000, according to the President’s decree, the Ministry was merged into the Ministry of Health and Social Security. On May 20, 2000 according to the President’s decree, the Ministry was separated as the Ministry of Social Security. On December 25, 2003, pursuant to the President’s decree, it was renamed the Ministry of Labour and Social Affairs.

== List of ministers ==
Name	Term	President
Ashot Yesayan	1991–1995	Levon Ter-Petrosyan
Raphael Bagoyan	1995–1996	Levon Ter-Petrosyan
Hranush Hakobyan	1996–1998	Levon Ter-Petrosyan
Gagik Yeganyan	1998–1999	Robert Kocharyan
Razmik Martirosyan	1999–2003	Robert Kocharyan
Aghvan Vardanyan	2003–2008	Robert Kocharyan
Arsen Hambardzumyan	2008–2009	Serzh Sargsyan
Gevorg Petrosyan	2009–2009	Serzh Sargsyan
Mkhitar Mnatsakanyan	2009–2010	Serzh Sargsyan
Arthur Gregorian	2010–2012	Serzh Sargsyan
Artem Asatryan	2012–2018	Serzh Sargsyan
Mane Tandilyan	2018–2018	Armen Sarkissian
Zaruhi Batoyan	2019–2020	Armen Sarkissian
