= Ministry of Labor and Social Affairs (Armenia) =

Government ministry of Armenia

Ministry of Labor and Social Affairs of Armenia
- ՀՀ աշխատանքի և սոցիալական հարցերի նախարարություն

Agency overview
- Formed: 1918
- Jurisdiction: Government of Armenia
- Headquarters: Government Building 3, Yerevan 0010, Yerevan
- Minister responsible: Mesrop Arakelyan, Minister of Labor and Social Affairs
- Website: mlsa.am

The Ministry of Labor and Social Affairs of Armenia (Armenian: ՀՀ աշխատանքի և սոցիալական հարցերի նախարարություն) is a republican body of executive authority, which elaborates and implements the policies of the Government of Armenia in the labor and social security sectors.

== Former ministers ==
- Ashot Yesayan
- Rafayel Bagoyan
- Hranush Hakobyan
- Gagik Yeganyan
- Razmik Martirosyan
- Aghvan Vardanyan
- Arsen Hambardzumyan
- Gevorg Petrosyan
- Mkhitar Hambardzumyan
- Arthur Grigoryan
- Artem Asatryan
- Mane Tandilyan
- Zaruhi Batoyan

== See also ==
- Social protection in Armenia
