= Yerevan Water World =

Water park in Yerevan, Armenia

Coordinates: 40°12′15″N 44°33′29″E

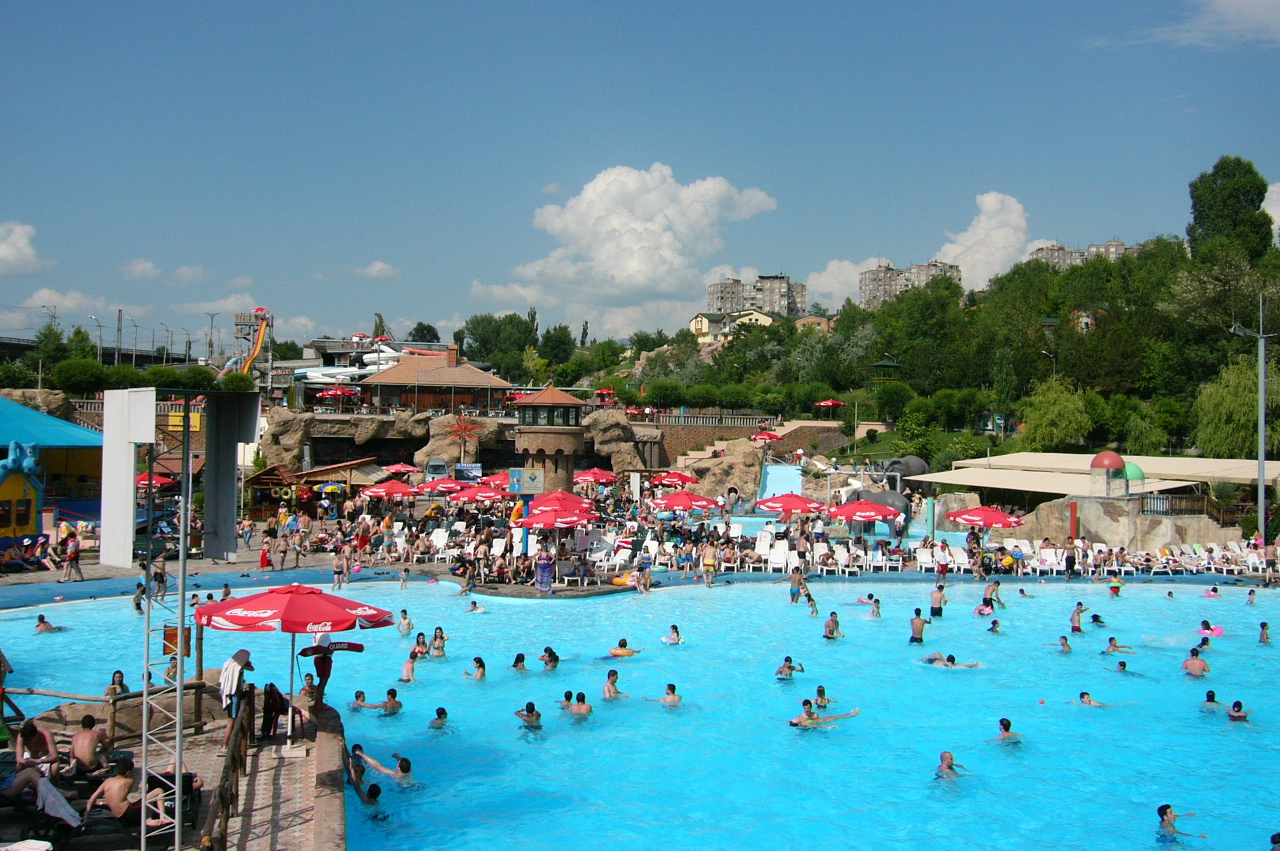
- Yerevan Water World
- Location: Yerevan, Armenia
- Owner: X Group
- Opened: 2001
- Operating season: summer (open-air park) year-round (indoor park)
- Area: 3 hectares (7.4 acres)
- Pools: 7 outdoor and 3 indoor pools
- Water slides: 12 water slides
- Children's areas: 2 children's areas

Yerevan Water World (Armenian: Ջրաշխարհ (Jrashkharh)) is a water park situated on Myasnikyan Avenue of Nor Nork district in the Armenian capital of Yerevan. The Water World has an open-air water park occupying an area of 2.5 hectares and an indoor water park of 0.5 hectare.

== Summer water park ==
Yerevan Water World was opened in 2001 in one of the most picturesque sites of Yerevan on Myasnikyan Avenue, lying between the Yerevan Zoo and the Botanical Garden, with an area of 3 hectares.

The open-air park is home to 2 large pools, 1 children's pool, 1 VIP pool and 3 pools for water slide attractions. There are food and beverage outlets and a restaurant with a capacity of 120 people.

During winter time, the largest pool of the park is turned into an ice skating rink, offering a surface of 500 m^{2}.

== Indoor water park ==
The indoor water park known as Aquatek was opened in 2008, occupying an area of 0.5 hectare. It has 2 large pools and 1 children's pool with several water slides, geysers and jets. The indoor park is also home to Aquatek Spa Hotel of 29 rooms, with a large fitness club, a medical rehabilitation centre as well as wall-climbing facilities. Aquatek is open all year round without holidays.
