= Mane Tandilyan =

Armenian historian and politician

- Մանե Թանդիլյան
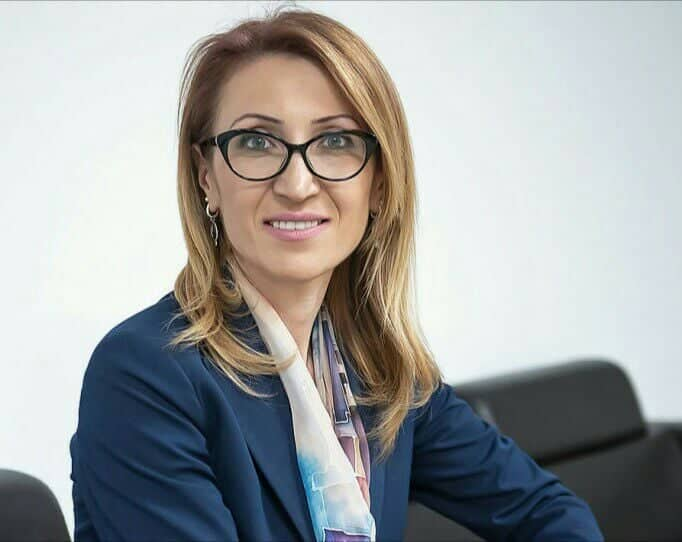

Minister of Labor, Social and Housing Affairs of Artsakh
- In office 2 December 2020 – August 2021
- President: Arayik Harutyunyan

Member of the National Assembly of Armenia
- In office 14 January 2019 – August 2020
- Parliamentary group: Bright Armenia
- Constituency: Yerevan Districts Kentron, Nork-Marash, Erebuni, Nubarashen

Minister of Labour and Social Affairs
- In office 12 May 2018 – 14 November 2018
- President: Armen Sarkissian
- Prime Minister: Nikol Pashinyan
- Preceded by: Artem Asatryan
- Succeeded by: Zaruhi Batoyan

Member of the National Assembly of Armenia
- In office 2 April 2017 – 12 May 2018
- Parliamentary group: Way Out Alliance
- Constituency: Yerevan Districts Avan, Nor Nork, Kanaker-Zeytun

Personal details
- Born: 3 April 1978 (age 48) Alaverdi, Armenia SSR, Soviet Union
- Party: Bright Armenia
- Children: 2
- Education: Armenian State Pedagogical University; American University of Armenia

Mane Vanyayi Tandilyan (Armenian: Մանե Վանյայի Թանդիլյան; born 3 April 1978), is an Armenian historian and politician, Member of the National Assembly of Armenia and former Minister of Labour and Social Affairs of the Republic from 12 May 2018 until she resigned on 14 November 2018.

== Biography ==
Born in the northern town of Alaverdi, she graduated in history in the Armenian State Pedagogical University in 1999. Three years later, she graduated in business in the American University of Armenia and got a master's degree in Business Administration. In 2005, she founded and led the Armenian Council of the International European Movement. She is married with two children.

== Political career ==
Since 15 December 2015, she is a member of the party Bright Armenia, and on 22 December 2017, she became Secretary of the party's Council.

In 2017 parliamentary election she was elected as a member of the National Assembly of the 6th convocation for Way Out Alliance.

On 11 May 2018, after the Velvet Revolution, she was appointed Minister of Labor and Social Affairs of Armenia. On 12 June 2018, against the introduction of the mandatory component of the cumulative pension system by the government, she resigned, but Prime Minister Pashinyan, on June 21, didn't accept her resignation and she would continue her term.

On 14 November 2018 she resigned as Minister of Labor and Social Affairs on December 9 to participate in 2018 parliamentary election, getting a seat in the National Assembly.

Mane Tandilyan currently leads the Country of Living party.
