= St. Grigor Church (Gomur) =

Armenian church in the Nakhchivan Autonomous Republic of Azerbaijan

St. Grigor Church of Gomer
- Գոմերի Սուրբ Գրիգոր եկեղեցի
- St. Grigor Church of Gomer
- Location: Gömür, Nakhchivan
- Country: Azerbaijan
- Denomination: Armenian Apostolic Church

History
- Status: Destroyed
- Founded: 12th or 13th century

Architecture
- Style: basilica
- Demolished: 1997–2009

St. Grigor Church was an Armenian church located in the village of Gomur (Shahbuz District) of the Nakhchivan Autonomous Republic of Azerbaijan. It was located atop high ground in the center of the village.

== History ==
The church was founded in the 12th or 13th century and was renovated in the 17th century.

== Architecture ==
The basilica-style church consisted of a single nave, two aisles, two vestries, and a hall, with decorated doorways in the west and south. There were two khachkars with relief decorations on the western. There were Armenian inscriptions on the western and southern facades.

== Destruction ==
The church was in a well-preserved condition in the late Soviet period. It was listed on the 1988 list of Historical and Cultural Monuments of the Azerbaijan SSR under inventory number 2856. However, it was destroyed at some point between 1997 and November 11, 2009, as documented by Caucasus Heritage Watch.
