= Gömür, Nakhchivan =

Village and municipality in Nakhchivan, Azerbaijan

Gömür
- Municipality
- Location within Azerbaijan
- Coordinates: 39°27′42″N 45°45′16″E
- Country: Azerbaijan
- Autonomous republic: Nakhchivan
- District: Shahbuz

Population (2005)
  - Total: 482
- Time zone: UTC+4 (AZT)

Gömür (also, Gëmyur and Kömür; Armenian: Գեմուր) is a village and municipality in the Shahbuz District of Nakhchivan, Azerbaijan. It is located 20 km in the east from the district center, on the slope of the ridge of Zangezur. Its population is busy basically with animal husbandry. There are secondary school, library, club and a medical center in the village. It has a population of 482.

== Etymology ==
Gömür - is the administrative unit of the same name village of the Shahbuz District. It is central highlands territory. The toponym means "at the top of the mountain, a place at the height ".

== History ==
According to the results of the population census cameral, launched in April 1829 and ended in May 1832 by the leadership Ivan Ivanovich Chopin's, in the Gömür village of the Nakhchivan district of the Nakhchivan province of the Armenian oblast (On March 16, 1828, according to the fifteenth paragraph of the Treaty of Turkmenchay, concluded on February 10, in 1828, the Armenians deported from Qajar Empire to the Azerbaijan) at 12 houses were lived 50 Armenians, including 27 men, 23 women.

== Monuments ==
St. Grigor Church was an Armenian church located atop high ground in the center of the village. The church was founded in the 12th or 13th century and was destroyed at some point between 1997 and November 11, 2009.

== Notable Natives ==
- Aghvan Vardanyan, Armenian politician
- Vardges Avagyan, Armenian sculptor

== See also ==
- St. Grigor Church (Gomur)
