= Nork, Yerevan =

Coordinates: 40°10′46″N 44°32′34″E

Nork
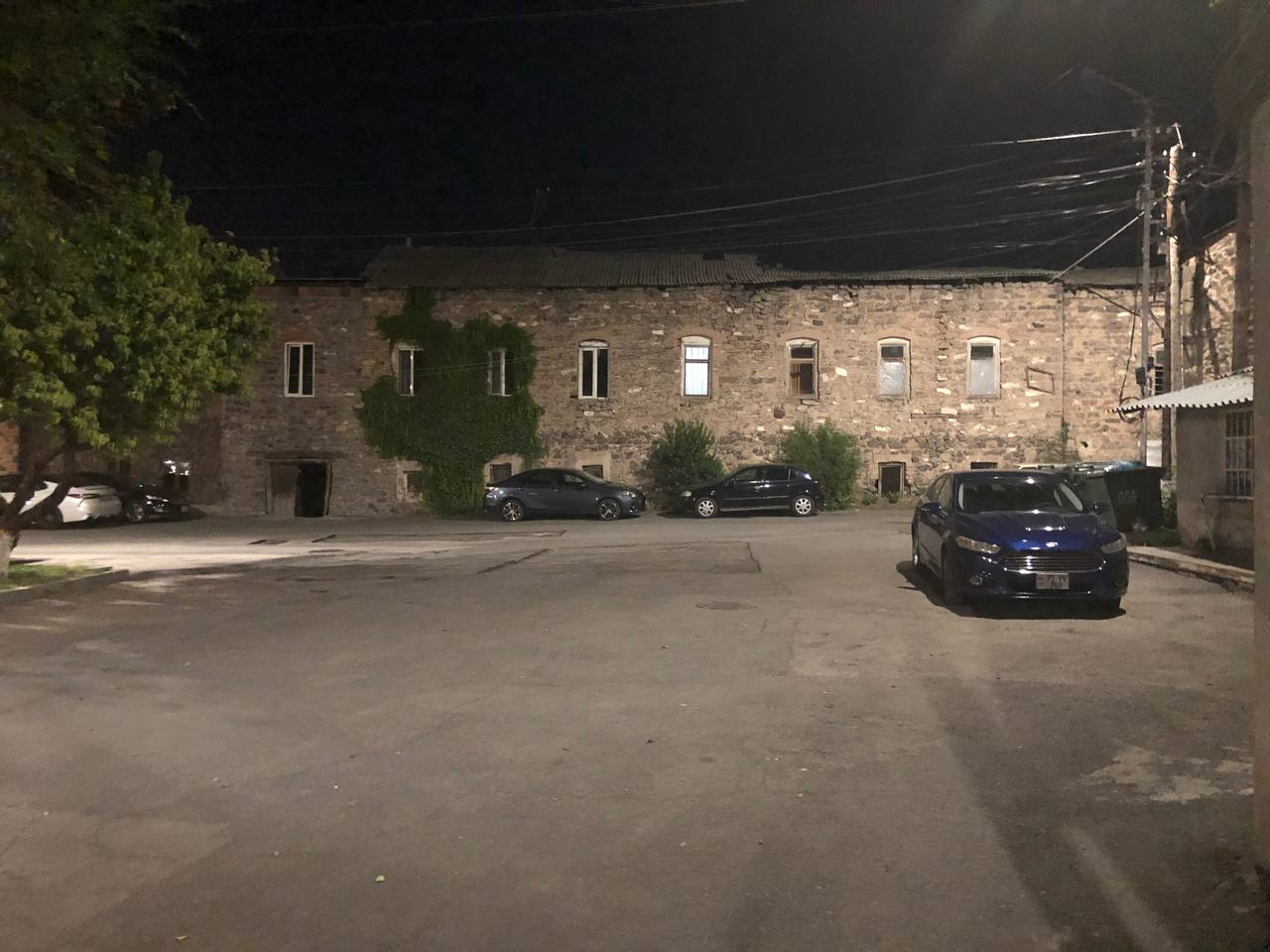
- The central square of Nork
- Interactive map of Nork
- Country: Armenia
- Marz (Province): Yerevan
- District: Nork-Marash
- Time zone: UTC+4 ( )

Nork (Armenian: Նորք), sometimes called as Hin Nork (Old Nork), is a historical neighbourhood in the Armenian capital Yerevan that came from the incorporation of the village with the same name. It is located in the Nork-Marash District.

== History ==
As a settlement, Nork has existed since the Bronze Age, but the first mention of it is dated to the 18th century. Winemaking, gardening and sericulture have prospered in Nork.

In the early 21st century, the neighbourhood is slowly gentrifying. Nork has its own festivals and excursions, and new restaurants are opening.

== Gallery ==
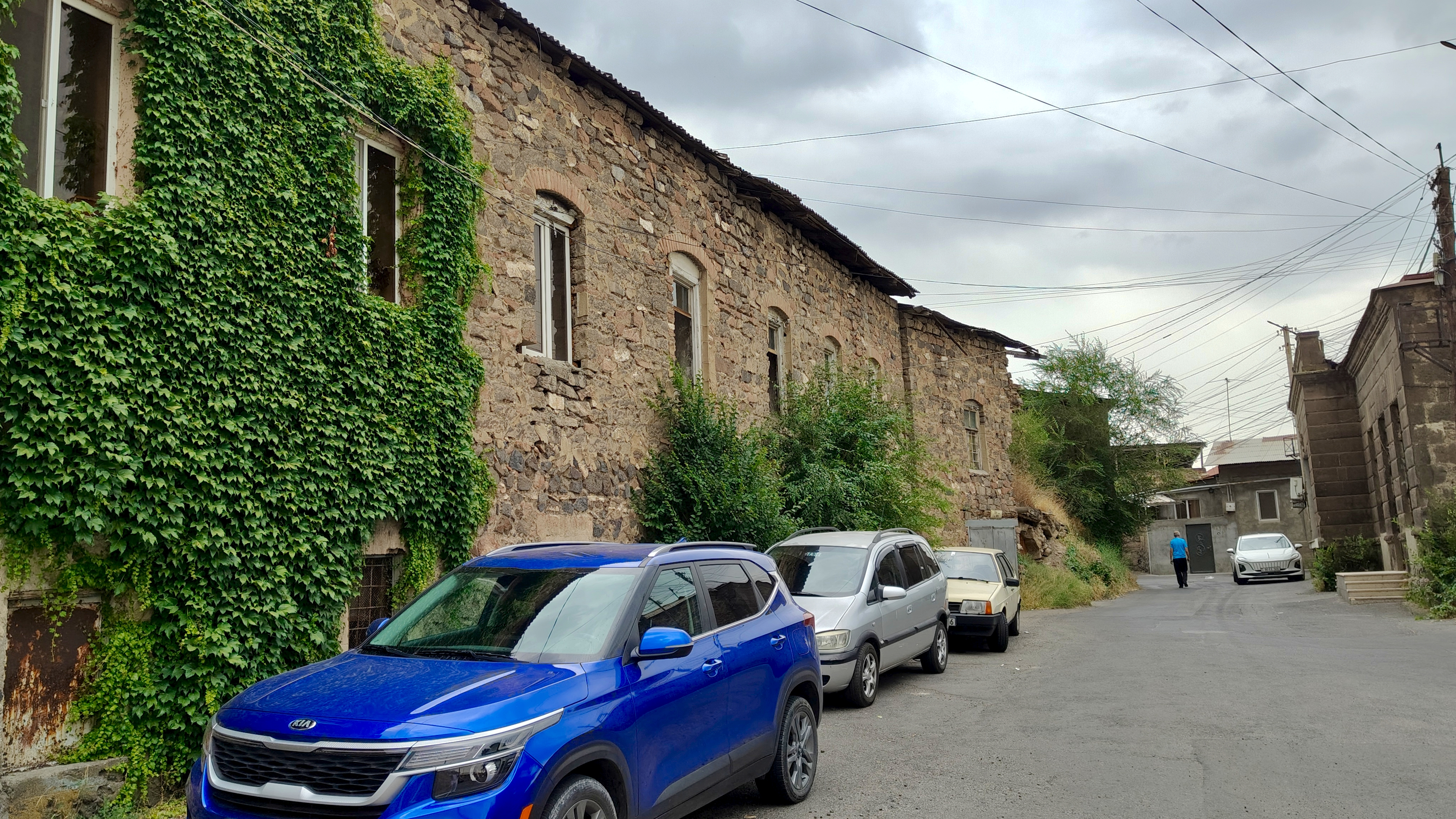
An old street in Nork

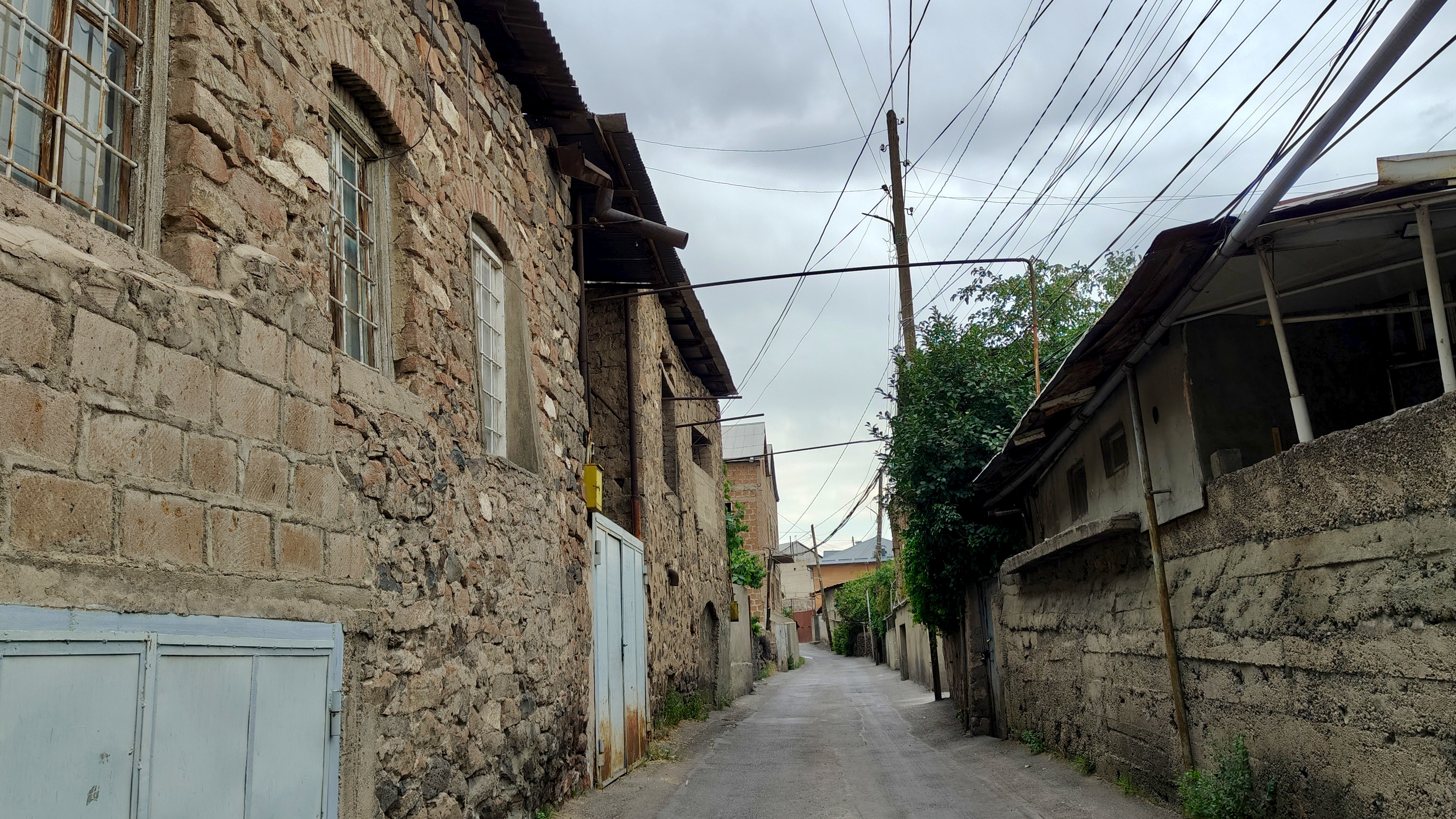
An old street in Nork

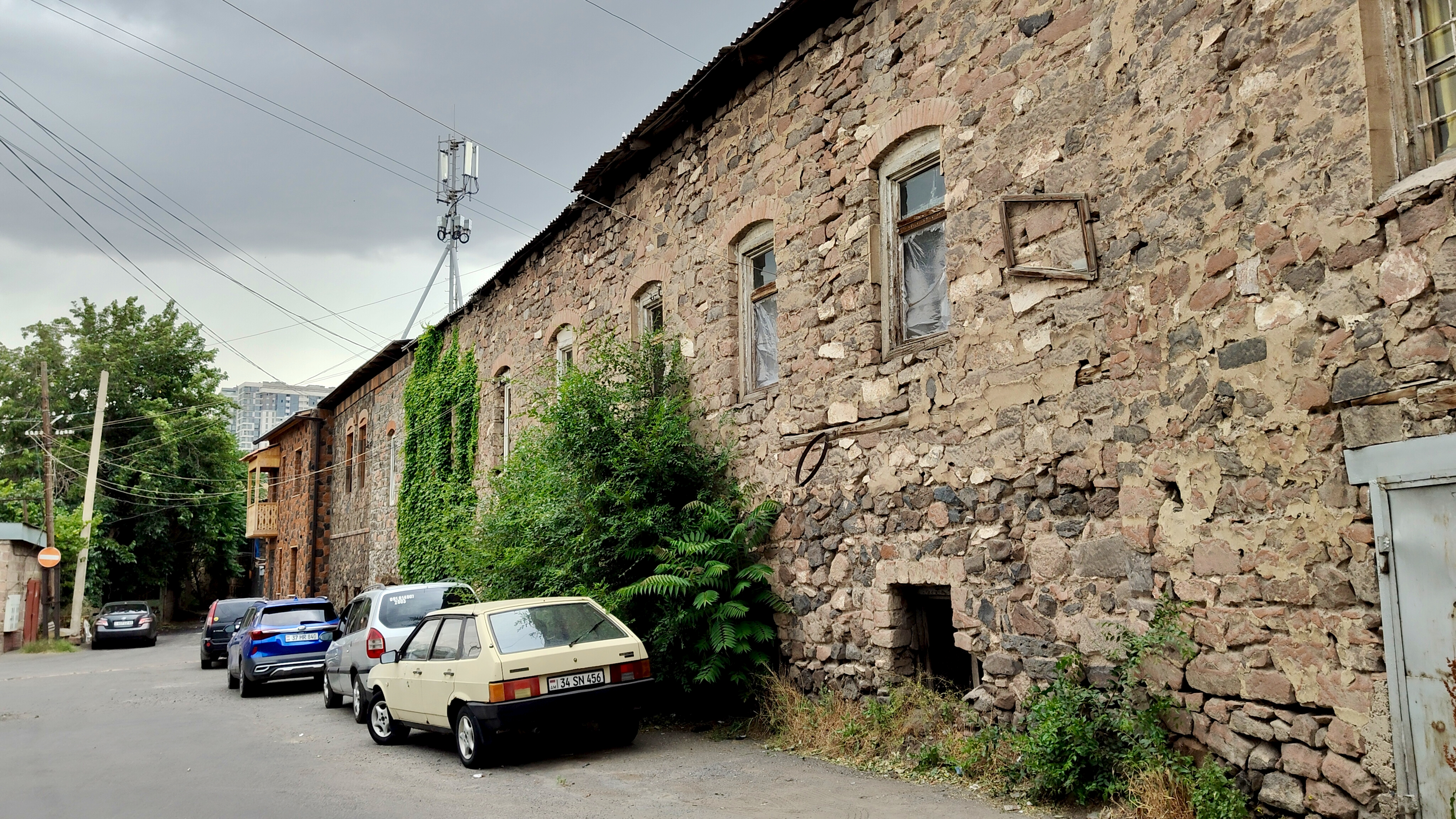
Old buildings in Nork

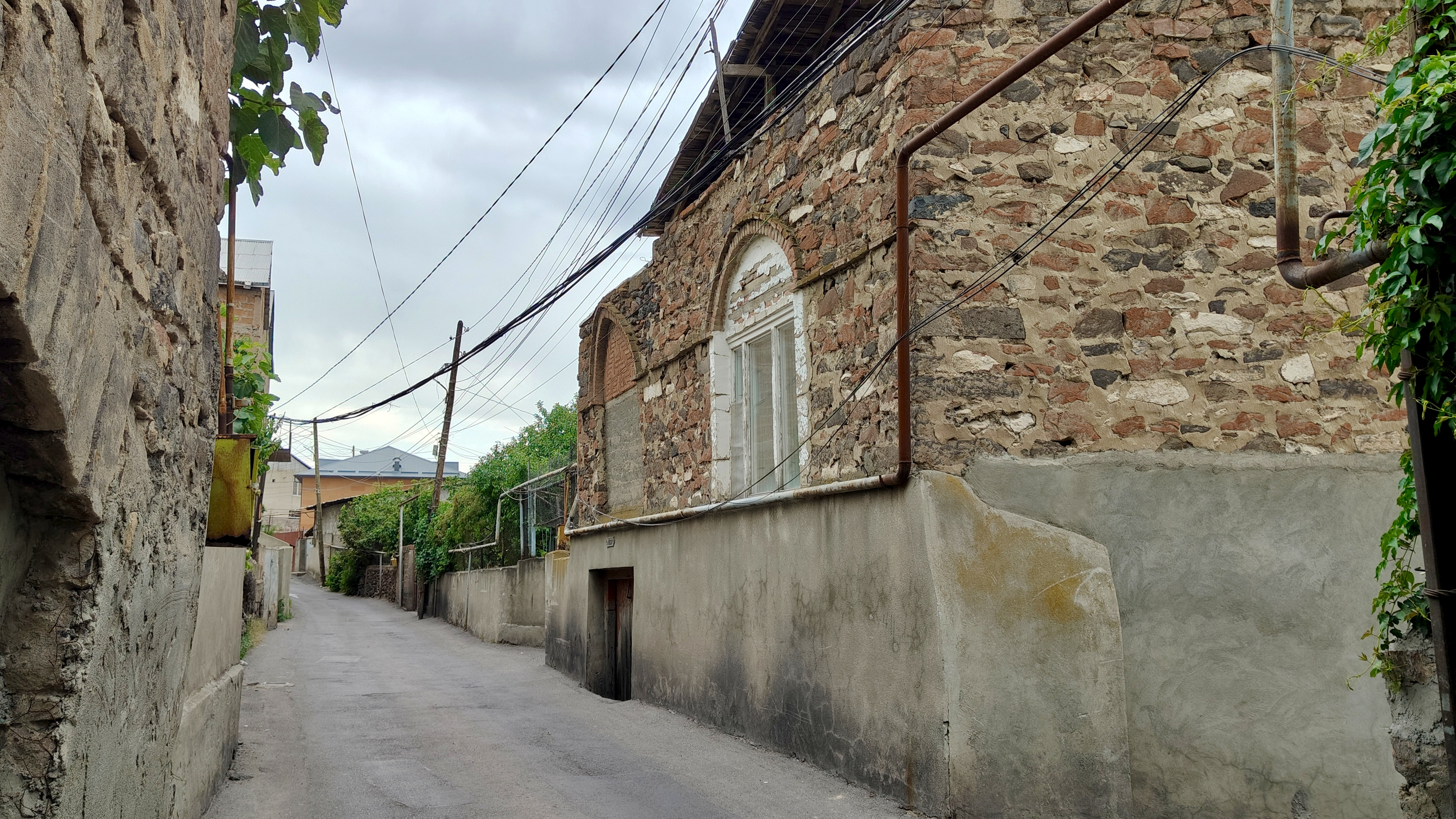
An old street in Nork

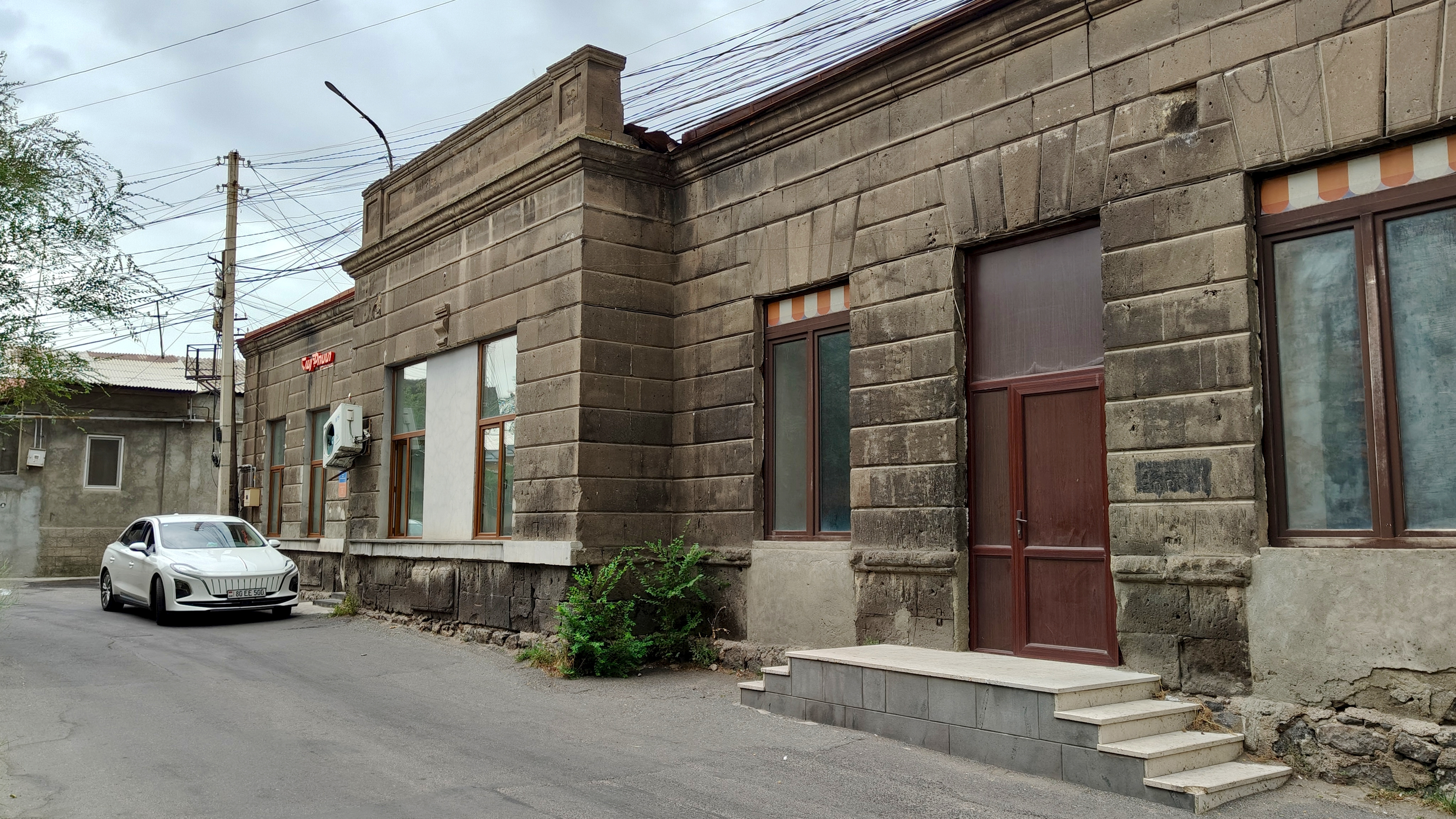
Old building in Nork

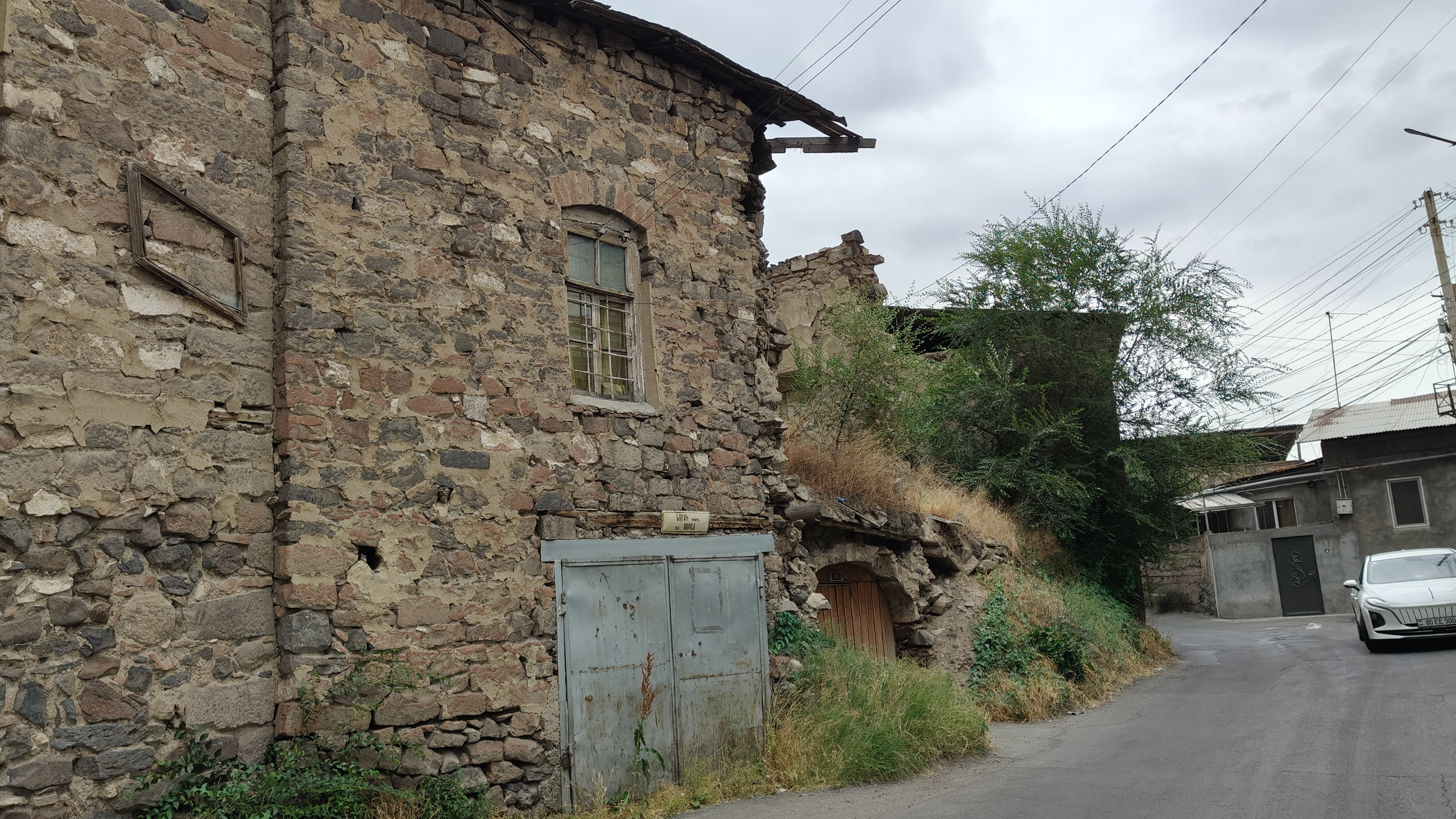
Old building in Nork

== See also ==
- Kond
- Kanaker
- Noragyugh
