= Nork-Marash District =

District in Yerevan, Armenia

Nork-Marash Նորք-Մարաշ
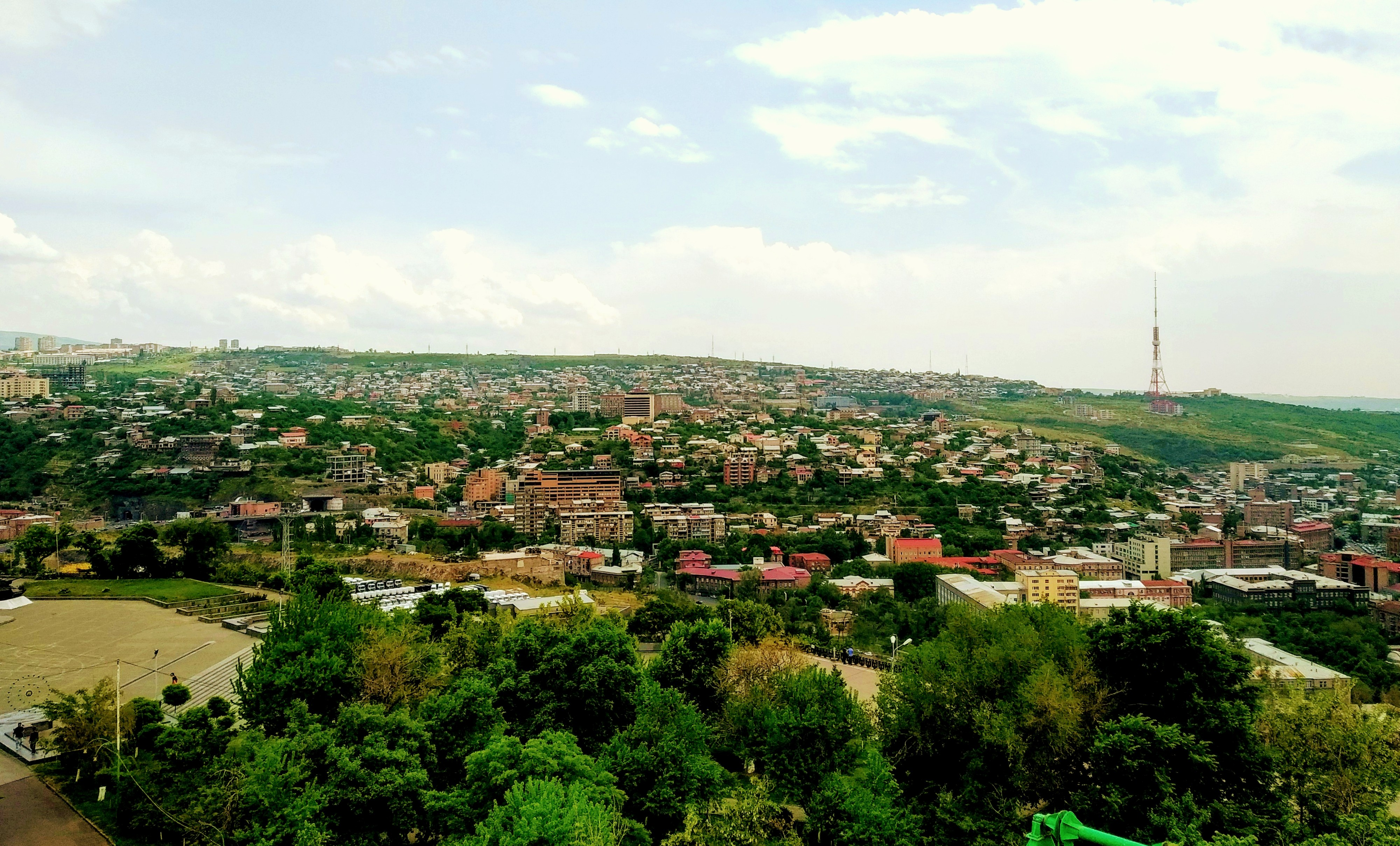
- Nork-Marash

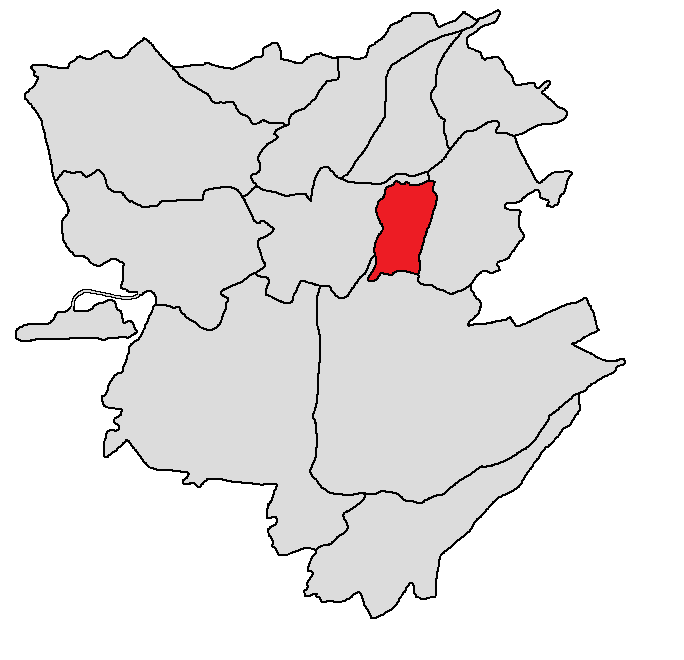
- Nork-Marash district shown in red

- Location within Armenia
- Coordinates: 40°10′27″N 44°32′27″E
- Country: Armenia
- Marz (Province): Yerevan

Area
  - Total: 4.76 km^{2} (1.84 sq mi)

Population (2022 census)
  - Total: 11,098
  - Density: 2,330/km^{2} (6,040/sq mi)
- Time zone: UTC+4 (AMT)

Nork-Marash (Armenian: Նորք-Մարաշ վարչական շրջան, romanized: Nor’-Marash varch’akan shrjan), is one of the 12 districts of Yerevan, the capital of Armenia. It is located to the east of the city centre. It is bordered by the Kentron District from the west and the north, Nor Nork from the east and Erebuni from the south. The name of the district is derived from the Nork neighbourhood of Yerevan and the ancient major of Marash in Republic of Turkey. The district is unofficially divided into smaller neighborhoods such as Nork and Nor Marash.

The district was formed in 1996 through the merger of Nork and Nor Marash neighborhoods. It has an area of 4 km^{2} and a population of 11,098 (2022 census), making Nork-Marash the least populous district of Yerevan.

== Streets and landmarks ==
=== Main streets ===
- Garegin Hovsepyan Street.
- Armenak Armenakyan Street.
- David Bek Street.

=== Landmarks ===
- Holy Mother of God Church, opened in 1995.
- Public TV of Armenia and the Yerevan TV Tower.
- Nork-Marash Medical Center.

== Gallery ==
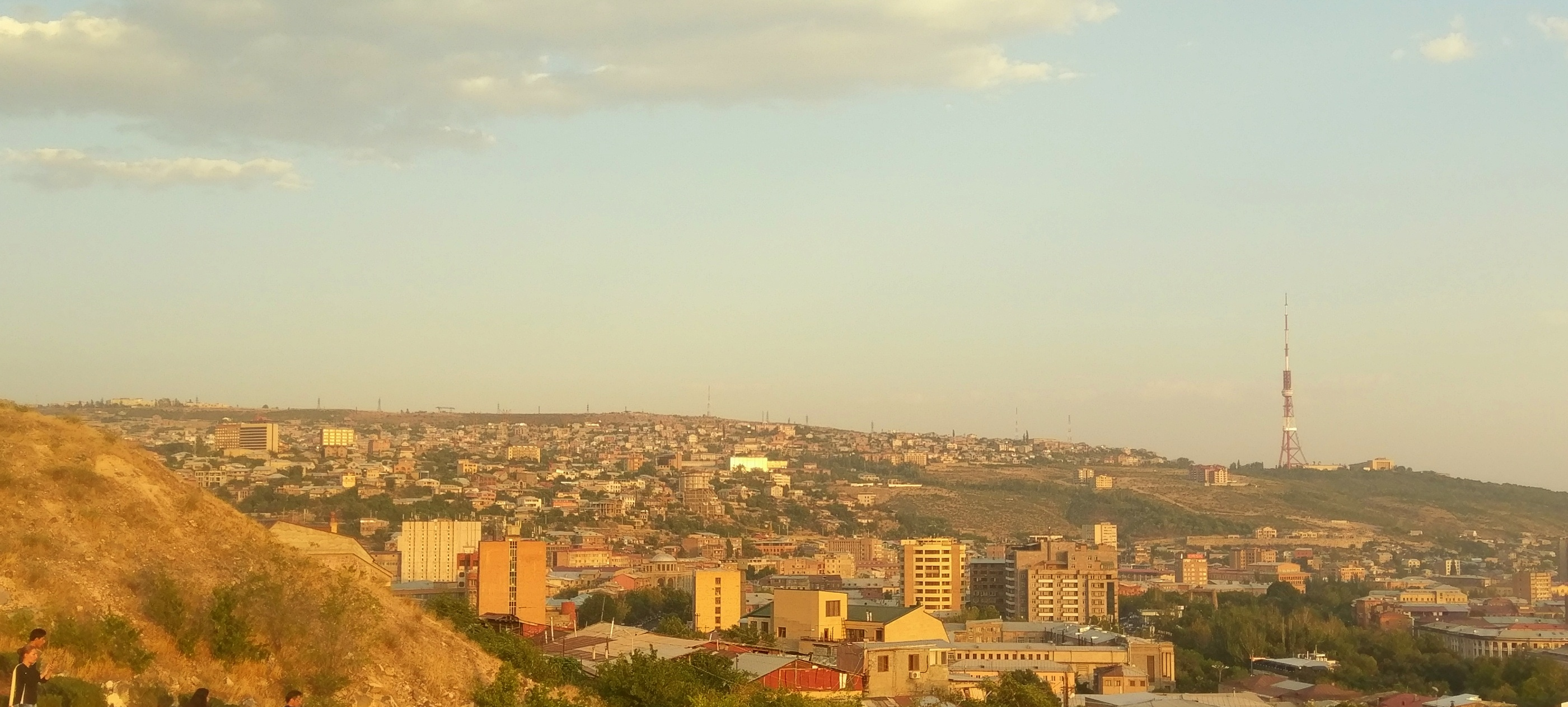
Nork-Marash district as seen from the top of the Yerevan Cascade

Nork-Marash district

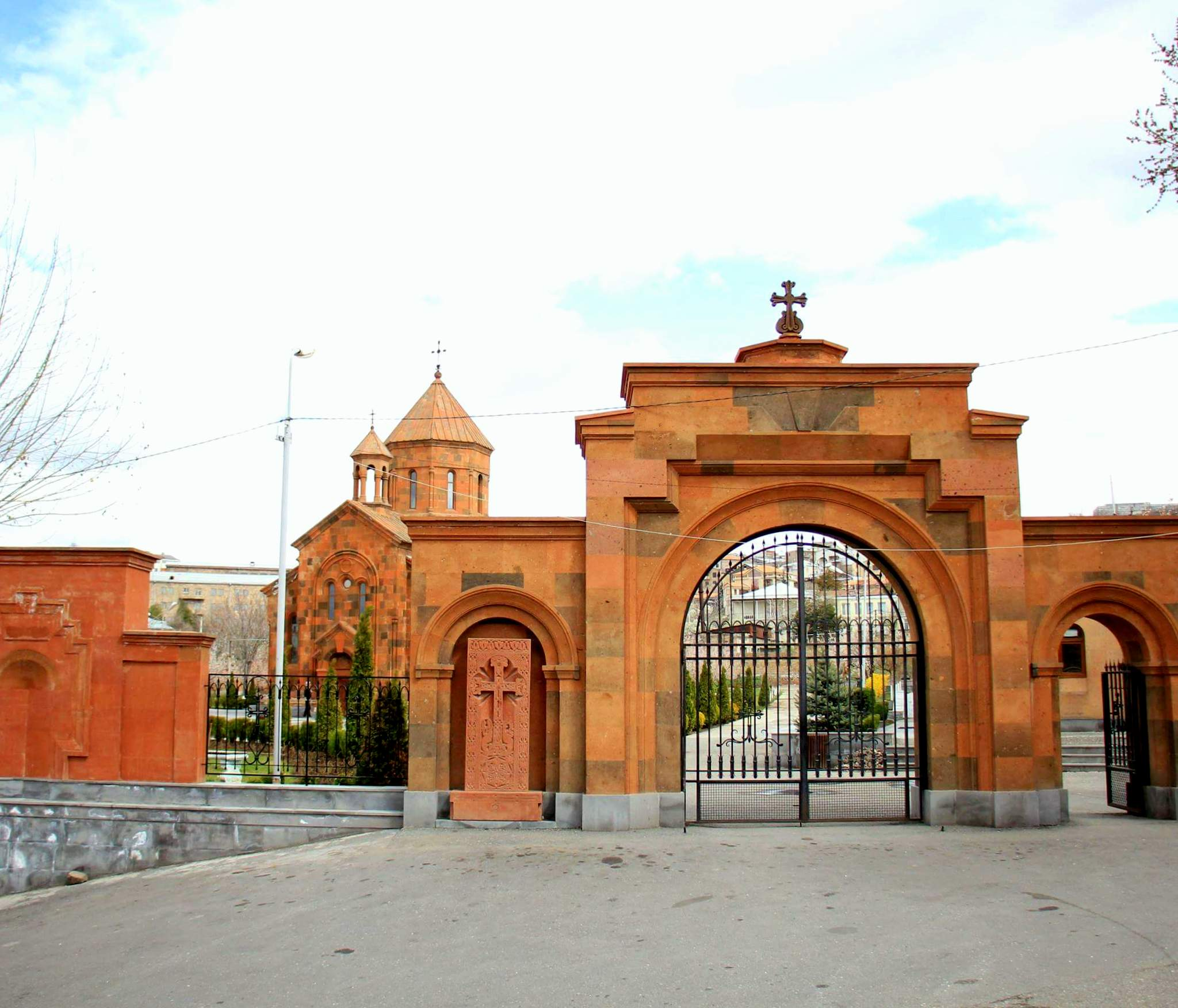
Holy Mother of God Church

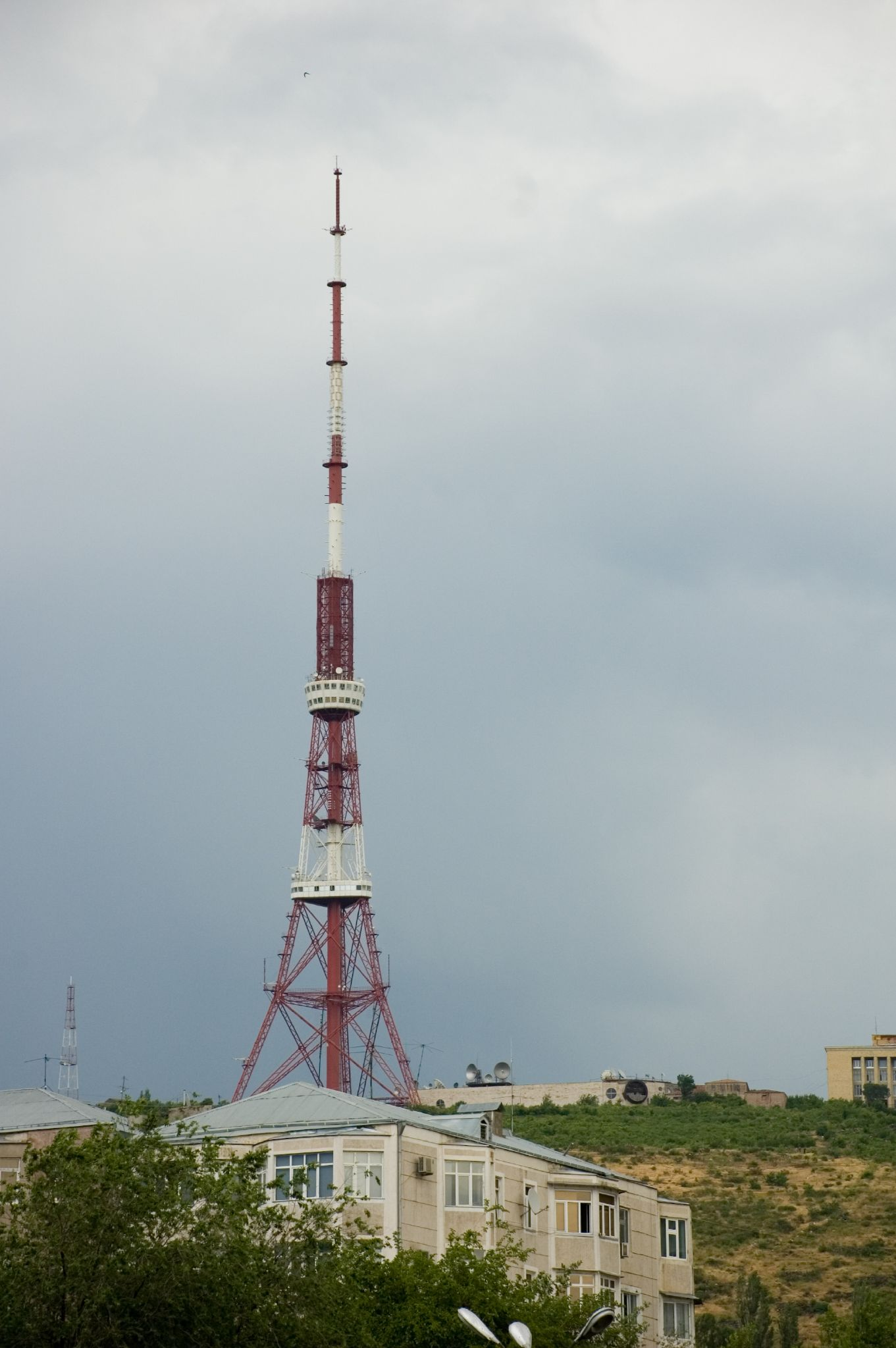
Yerevan TV Tower

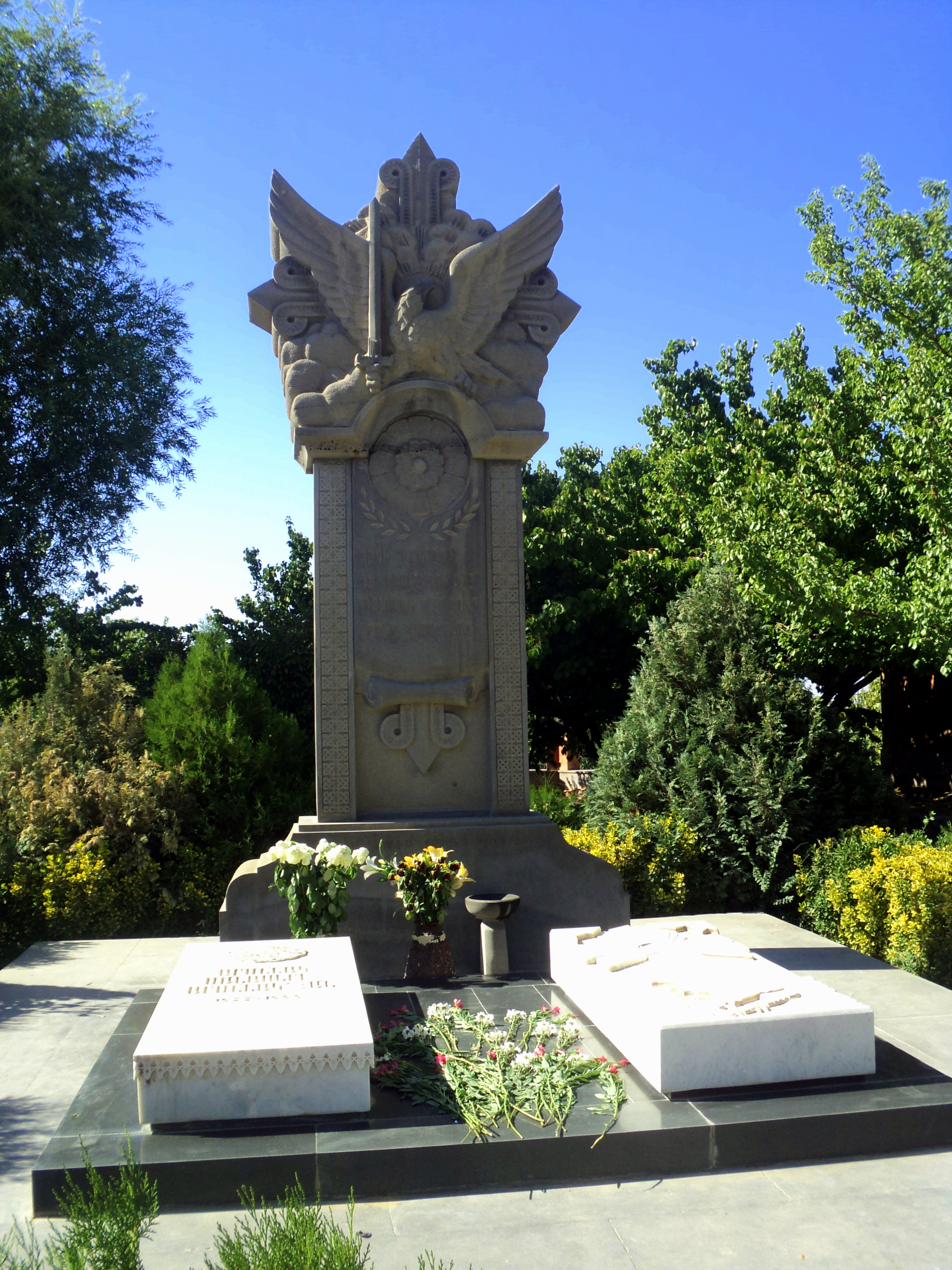
Nagorno-Karabakh conflict memorial

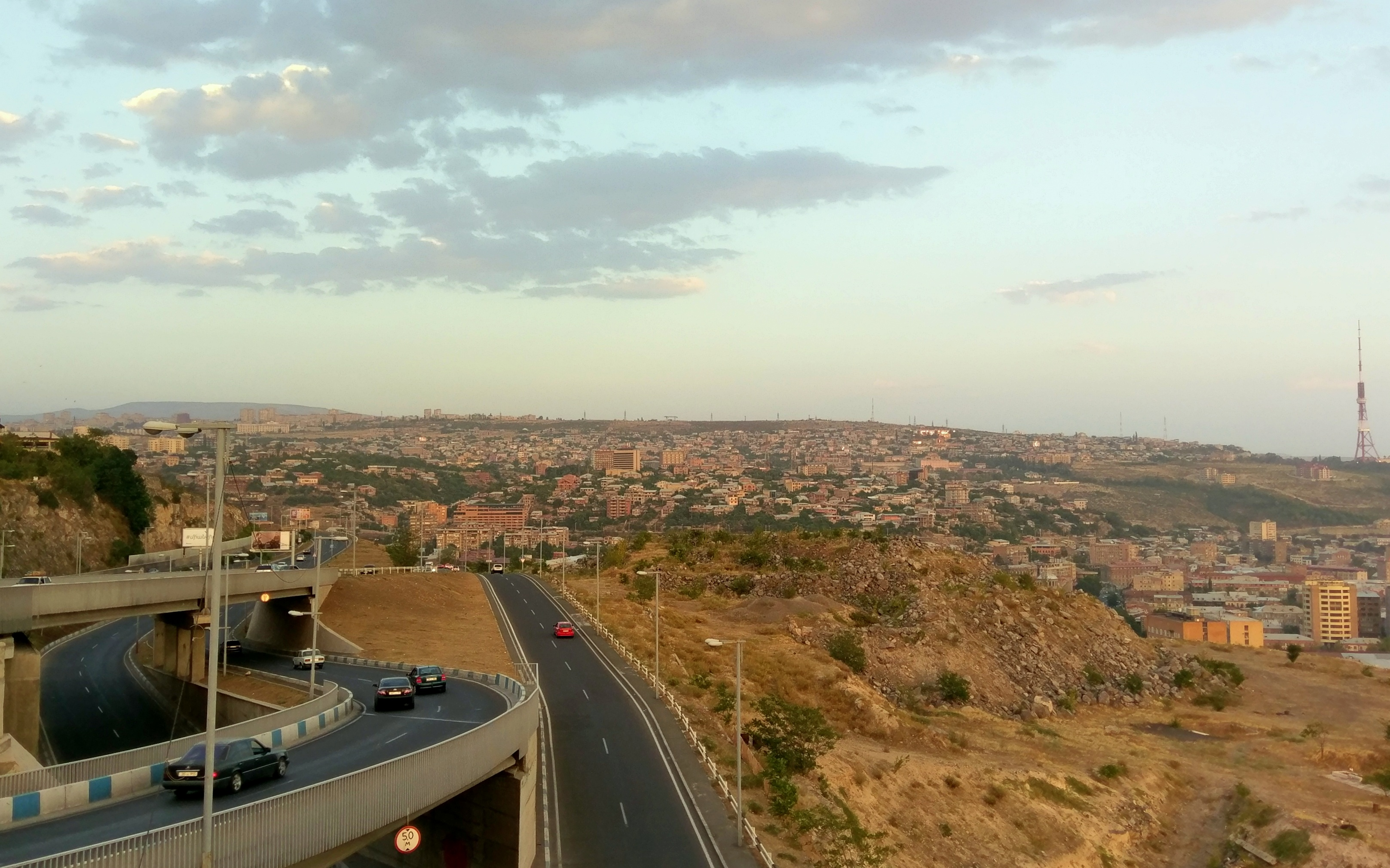
General view of Nork-Marash
