= Raphael Bagoyan =

Armenian politician (1948–2022)

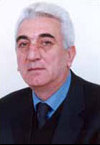

Labor and Social Affairs Minister of Armenia
- In office 1995–1996
- President: Levon Ter-Petrosyan
- Preceded by: Ashot Yesayan
- Succeeded by: Hranush Hakobyan

Personal details
- Born: Raphael Andranik Bagoyan; 25 March 1948 Baku, Armenian SSR, USSR
- Died: 16 November 2022 (aged 74)
- Education: Yerevan Polytechnic University

Raphael Andranik Bagoyan (Armenian: Ռաֆայել Անդրանիկի Բագոյան, 25 March 1948 – 16 November 2022) was an Armenian politician.

== Biography ==
In 1967, Bagoyan finished high school and graduated from the Department of Architecture and Construction at Polytechnic Institute in 1973. From 1973 to 1990, Raphael worked as an engineer, and chief engineer in the Department of Architecture and Planning at Yerevan City Council's Executive Committee, Deputy Chief Architect of Yerevan city, simultaneously supervising the work of the committee of Yerevan Urban Development Council on Engineering Affairs. In 1990, he was elected Deputy of the RA Supreme Council, then in 1991 headed the Executive Committee of the Erebuni District Council.

In 1993, he was appointed RA State Minister and coordinated the works of territorial administrative bodies, the Ministry of Social Security, the State Committee for Refugee Affairs, and the Pension Fund, meantime heading the activities of the committees of the RA Government Humanitarian Aid Central Commission, providing liaison between the Government of Armenia and Supreme Council, the Government of Armenia and non-government organizations, also heading the committee works over youth and juvenile issues against drug addiction and trafficking. From 1995 to 1996, he occupied the post of the Minister of Social Security, Employment, Migration and Refugee Affairs of Armenia.

From 1996 to 1997, Bagoyan headed the Central Committee of the Humanitarian Aid of the RA Government and from 1993 to 1997, in cooperation with the United Nations Armenian Office, the European Community Representation, US AID, TASIS, FAR and other international organizations, a number of social related laws and projects were developed and launched as well as the Social Services' Institute was established along with its territorial institutions, the "Paros" system was realized, to be able to organize and implement the process of providing socially vulnerable families with humanitarian aid or other addressed benefits. In October 1997, Bagoyan was elected the Head of Armenia's Consumer Companies Union Board; he took up a lot of transformation activities in the system reconstruction, democratization, making the economy meet the time requirements of the market relations, contributing to the development of economy in the country with the union's help. He had ruled the National Management Board (Armenia being the base country) of the project "Democracy and Development of Consumer Cooperation in the Caucasus Region", realized by the International Cooperative Alliance (ICA), Co-op Network Scandinavia Organizations and Olof Palme International Fund since 1999.
