= PhysMath School, Yerevan =

Physics and Mathematics Specialized School named after Artashes Shahinyan
- Արտաշես Շահինյանի անվան ֆիզիկամաթեմատիկական հատուկ դպրոց
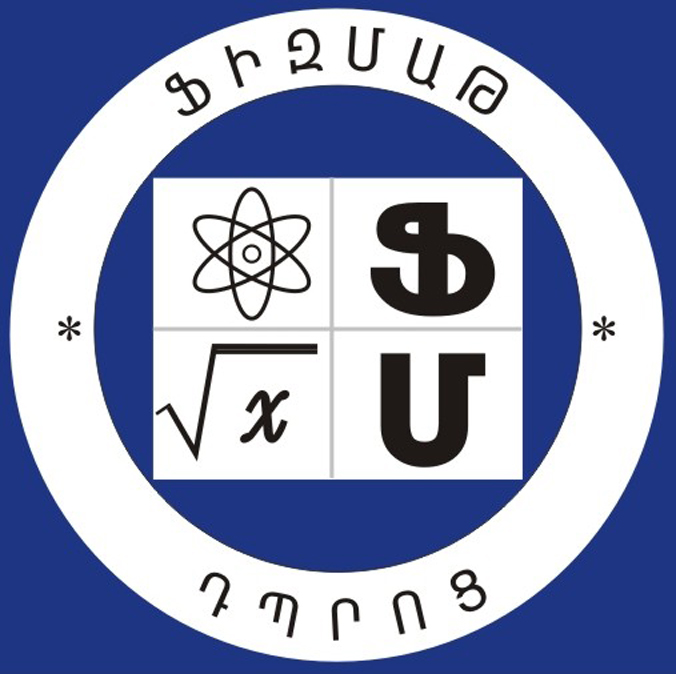

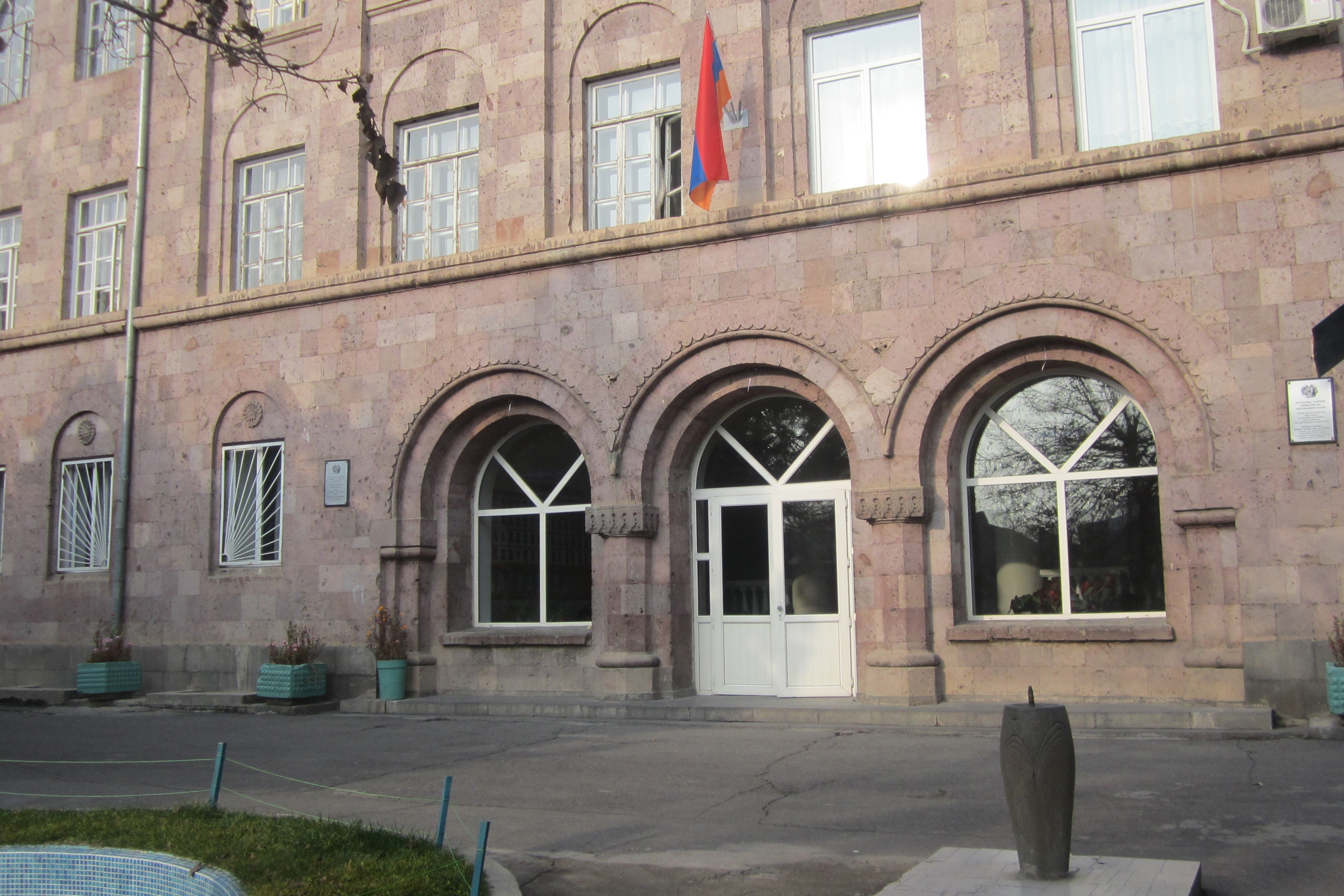

Location
- Liberty Avenue 2nd lane Yerevan; Armenia; 40°11′59″N 44°31′22″E

Information
- School type: Public
- Established: 1 September 1965
- Founder: Artashes Shahinyan
- Head of school: Arman Sargsyan
- Staff: 86
- Grades: 7-12
- Gender: mixed
- Language: Armenian, English, Russian
- Colors: White, Blue
- Athletics: Tennis, basketball, table tennis, chess, football
- Affiliation: Yerevan State University; Ministry of Education of Armenia
- Website: physmath.am

Officially the Physics and Mathematics Specialized School named after Artashes Shahinyan under the Yerevan State University, colloquially known as PhysMath School, is a state-owned high school located in Yerevan, Armenia. It is currently among the leading educational complexes in Yerevan. The school has a branch in Stepanakert; the capital of the unrecognized state of Artsakh.

== Overview ==
The PhysMath School was founded in 1965 in affiliation with the Yerevan State University and through the efforts of professor Artashes Shahinyan. Following the death of Shahinyan in 1978, the school was named after him.

The school is known for its role in preparing physics and mathematics teachers. It was ranked 1st in Armenia for the 2013-14 educational year.

The current headmaster of the school is Arman Sargsyan, serving since 2002.
