= Gagik Yeganyan =

Armenian politician (1956–2026)

- Գագիկ Եգանյան
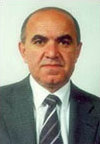

Labor and Social Affairs Ministers of Armenia
- In office 1998–1999
- President: Robert Kocharyan
- Preceded by: Hranush Hakobyan
- Succeeded by: Razmik Martirosyan

Personal details
- Born: Gagik Kimi Yeganyan; 2 June 1956 Arakyal, Nagorno-Karabakh Autonomous Oblast, Azerbaijan SSR, USSR
- Died: 15 January 2026 (aged 69)
- Children: 2
- Education: PhysMath School, Yerevan; Yerevan State University

Gagik Kimi Yeganyan (Armenian: Գագիկ Կիմի Եգանյան; 2 June 1956 – 15 January 2026) was an Armenian politician.

== Early life and career ==
Yeganyan was born on 2 June 1956 to Artsakh's Melik-Yeganyan father and Mikoyan mother, a family name taken by many famous people, including: Anastas Mikoyan, a Soviet statesman, and Artem Mikoyan, a Soviet Armenian aircraft designer who designed the MiG military aircraft. He was influenced by his father, Kim Yeganyan, to seek education as future statesman.

He studied at PhysMath School, Yerevan from 1969 to 1972, before obtaining both bachelor's and master's degrees in econometrics from Yerevan State University in 1977. Following it, he did post graduate studies at Yerevan Institute of National Economy, studying under academician Abel Aganbegyan. In 1981, at the age of 24, he got his PhD in economics. From 1992 to 2002, Yeganyan took various courses at the Joint Institute of Vienna, and competed as many as four times against six international organizations and the Austrian Authorities at the same institute. From 1999 to 2008, he served as Head of the State Migration Service of the Republic of Armenia and from June 1990 to June 1999 served as First Deputy Minister at the Ministry of Labor and Social Affairs of the Republic of Armenia. Between April 1983 and June 1990 was Chief Specialist of the Government of Armenian SSR (USSR). Yeganyan was an author of special course on Migration Management at the Yerevan State University and Russian-Armenian (Slavonic) State University.

In 2015, when in office as Head of the State Migration Service, Yeganyan led the negotiations with the Federal Migration Service of the Russian Federation, which resulted in lifting the entry ban for 28,000 Armenian citizens.

Between 2003 and 2010 he was elected and served as member of the Council of Europe Committee for Migration (CDMG), and from 2008 to 2009, as Vice President of the Bureau of the same committee.

In December 2018, he was elected as a member of the Public Council of Armenia, Chairman of the Standing Committee on Demography and Gender.

Yeganyan initiated and established a special shelter for asylum seekers in 2002.

== Other activities ==
Yeganyan actively participated in the resettlement of Artsakh, establishment of new villages and attracted donors for this purpose. In 1991 he travelled to Getashen that was completely blockaded, and solved the issue of pension payments – over a year Azerbaijan did not make pension payments to over 1000 villagers. In 2001 Yeganyan together with Sergo Yeritsyan teamed up with the Artsakh Diocese of the Armenian Apostolic Church to organize the baptism ceremony for more than 600 children from nearby communities in Dadivank, Artsakh.

Yeganyan coordinated the development and implementation of four strategies for Armenia's Migration Policy (in 2000, 2004, 2011 and 2017) and two action plans for the last two strategies.

He also headed the development and implementation of policy on integration of immigrants and refugees in 2016–2018.

Yeganyan initiated the development of a number of web-based information resources designed to help different categories of migrants, including backtoarmenia.am, www.tundarc.am, www.sendmoneyarmenia.am, www.miglib.org, http://karabagh.am/.

== Personal life and death ==
Yeganyan was an active mountaineer. He twice conquered Mount Ararat. In a 2018 interview he said: "I encourage everyone to go hiking. It is a lifestyle, it is an inseparable part of my life. At least once a week, I climb mountains, get energy there and return".

He was also known as a classical music connoisseur.

Yeganyan was married and had two sons. His elder son, Hayk Yeganyan, is the chief executive officer of Armenia Securities Exchange.

Gagik Yeganyan died on 15 January 2026, at the age of 69.

== Awards ==
- Medal of Gratitude (2017)
- Халыкаралык, medal for strengthening international cooperation, by the Kazakhstan Government (2018)
- State Counselor of the 2nd Class of the Civil Service of the Republic of Armenia awarded by the Armenian President (2006)
- Armenia's Prime Minister's Medal (2006)
- Nansen Award
- Medal of Special decree from the Russian Federal Migration Service on its 20th anniversary (2012)
- Medal of Recognition from the Ministry of Social Affairs and Labour of Russia (2009)
