= Nor Nork District =

District in Yerevan, Armenia

Coordinates: 40°11′54″N 44°33′55″E

Nor Nork Նոր Նորք
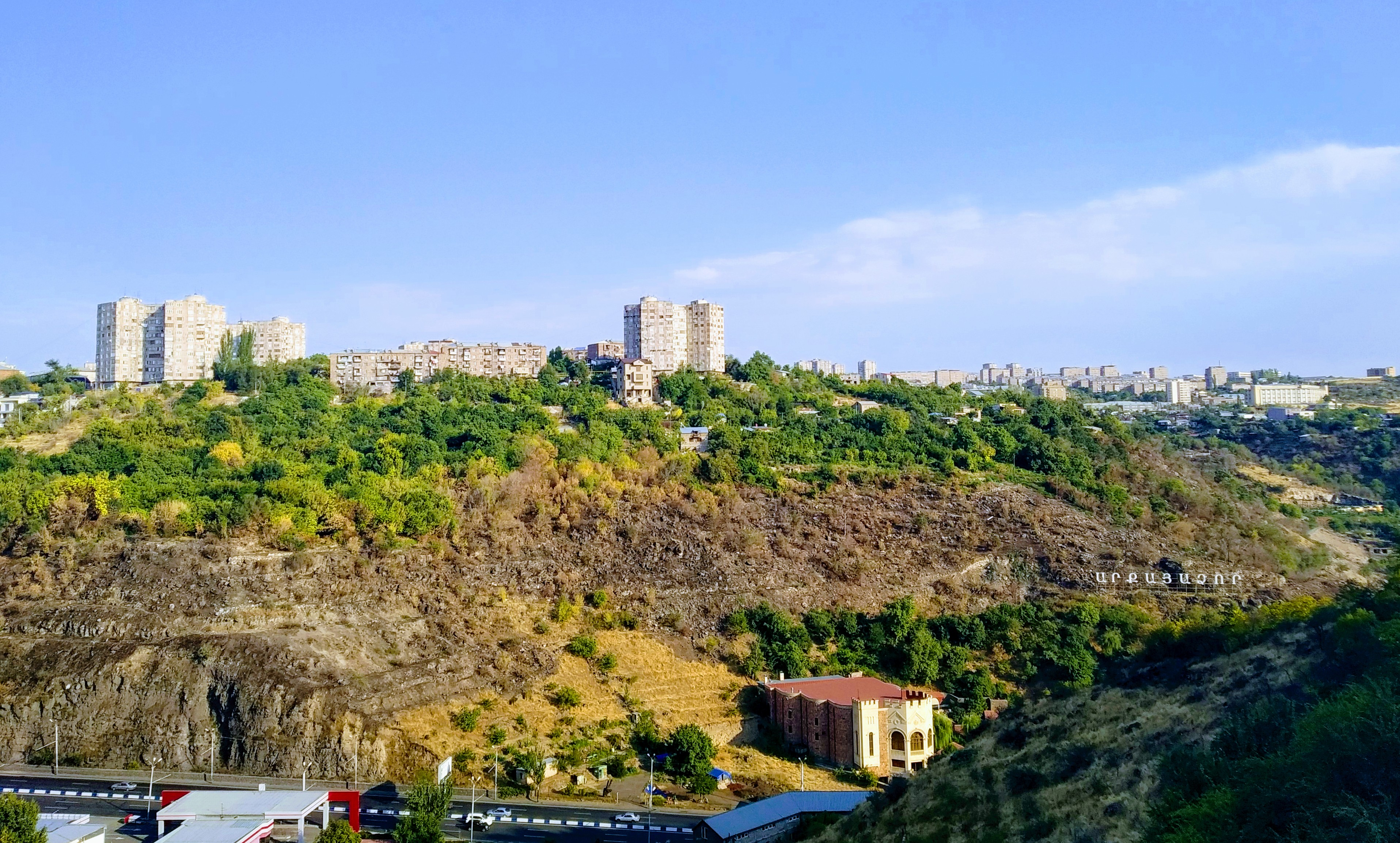
- Nor Nork skyline

- Nor Nork district shown in red

- Location within Armenia
- Country: Armenia
- Marz (Province): Yerevan

Government
  - Mayor of district: Hayk Mhryan

Area
  - Total: 14.11 km^{2} (5.45 sq mi)

Population (2022 census)
  - Total: 134,668
  - Density: 9,544/km^{2} (24,720/sq mi)
- Time zone: UTC+4 (AMT)
- Website: www.nor-norq.am

Nor Nork (Armenian: Նոր Նորք վարչական շրջան, romanized: Nor Nork’ varch’akan shrjan) is one of the 12 districts of Yerevan, the capital of Armenia. It is located at the eastern part of the city. It is bordered by the districts of Nork-Marash, Kentron and Kanaker-Zeytun from the west, Avan from the north and Erebuni from the south. Kotayk Province forms the eastern border of the district.

The district is unofficially divided into smaller neighborhoods including the 9 blocks of Nor Nork and the Bagrevand neighborhood. As of the 2022 census, the population of the district is 134,668.

== Streets and landmarks ==
=== Main streets ===
- Davit Bek street
- Gai avenue
- Tevosyan street
- Gyurjyan street
- Minski street
- Vilnyus street

=== Landmarks ===
- Saint Sarkis Church (built in 1999)
- Holy Mother of God Church (built in 2014)
- Fridtjof Nansen Park
- Tatul Krpeyan Park
- Vaspurakan Park
- Suren Nazaryan Garden
- Tigranes the Great Park
- Yerevan Zoo
- Yerevan Water World
- Vazgen Sargsyan Military Institute
- Ministry of Defence of Armenia

== Gallery ==
Nor Nork district

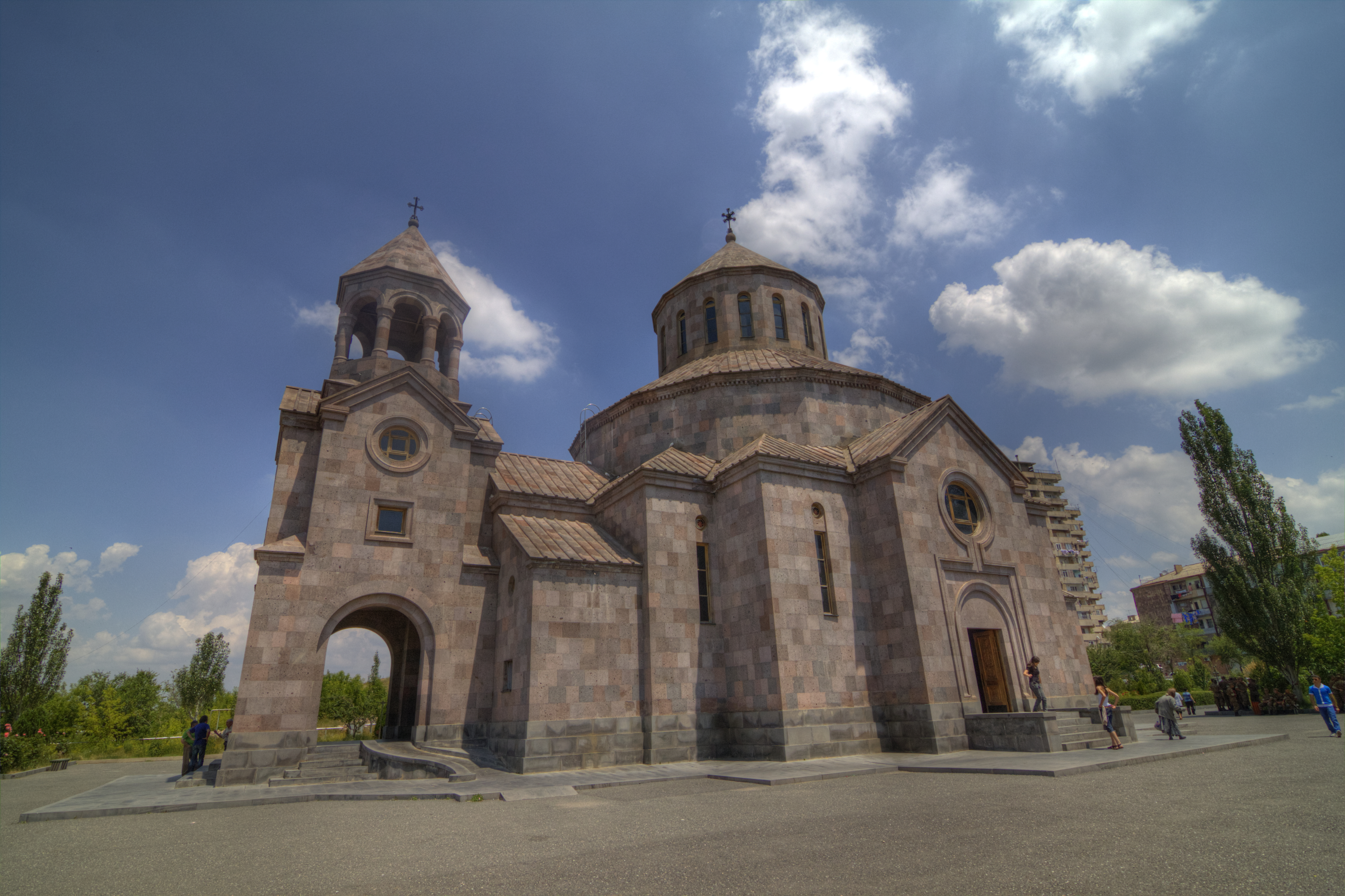
Saint Sarkis Church, consecrated in 1999

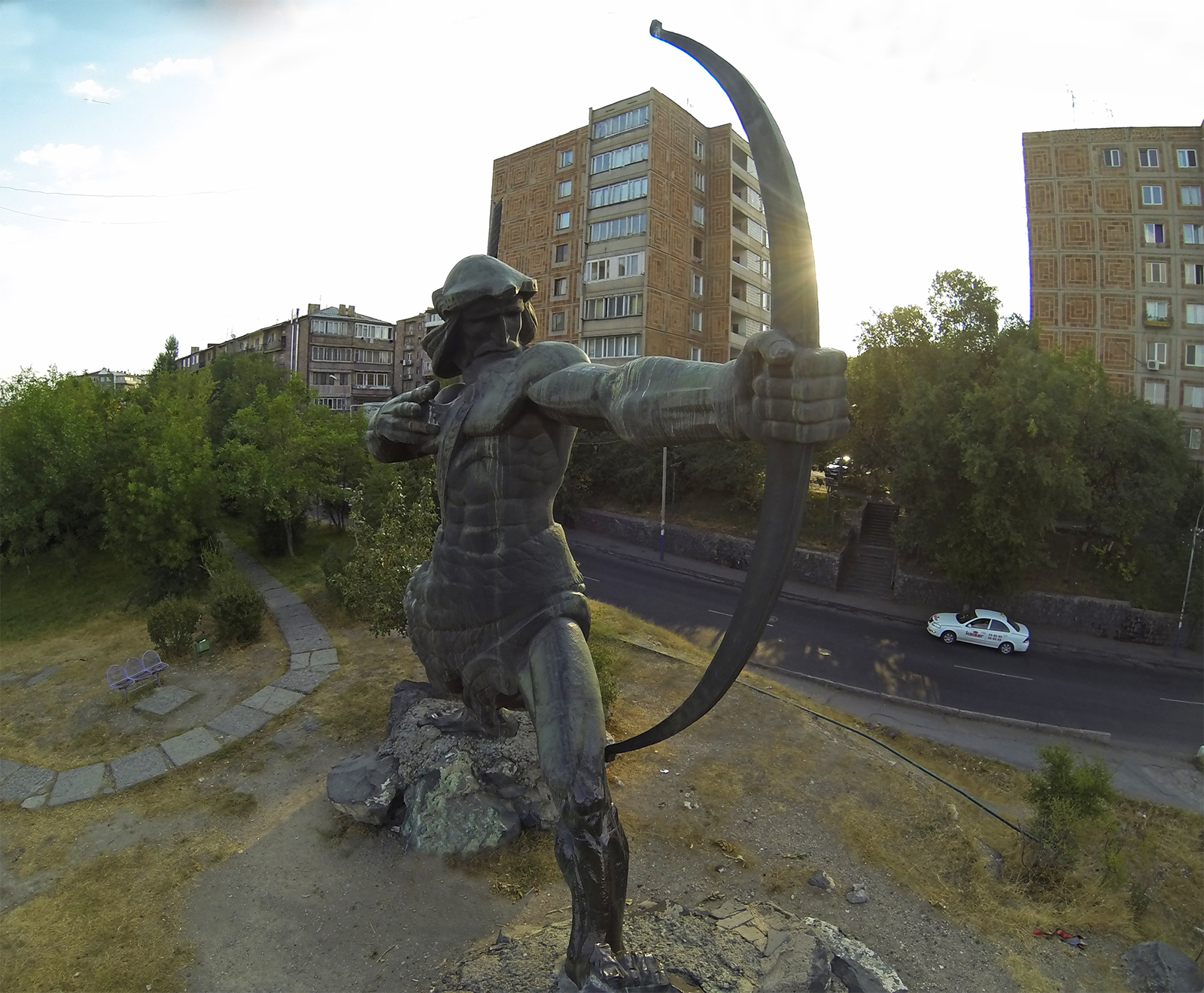
The statue of Hayk Nahapet in Nor Nork

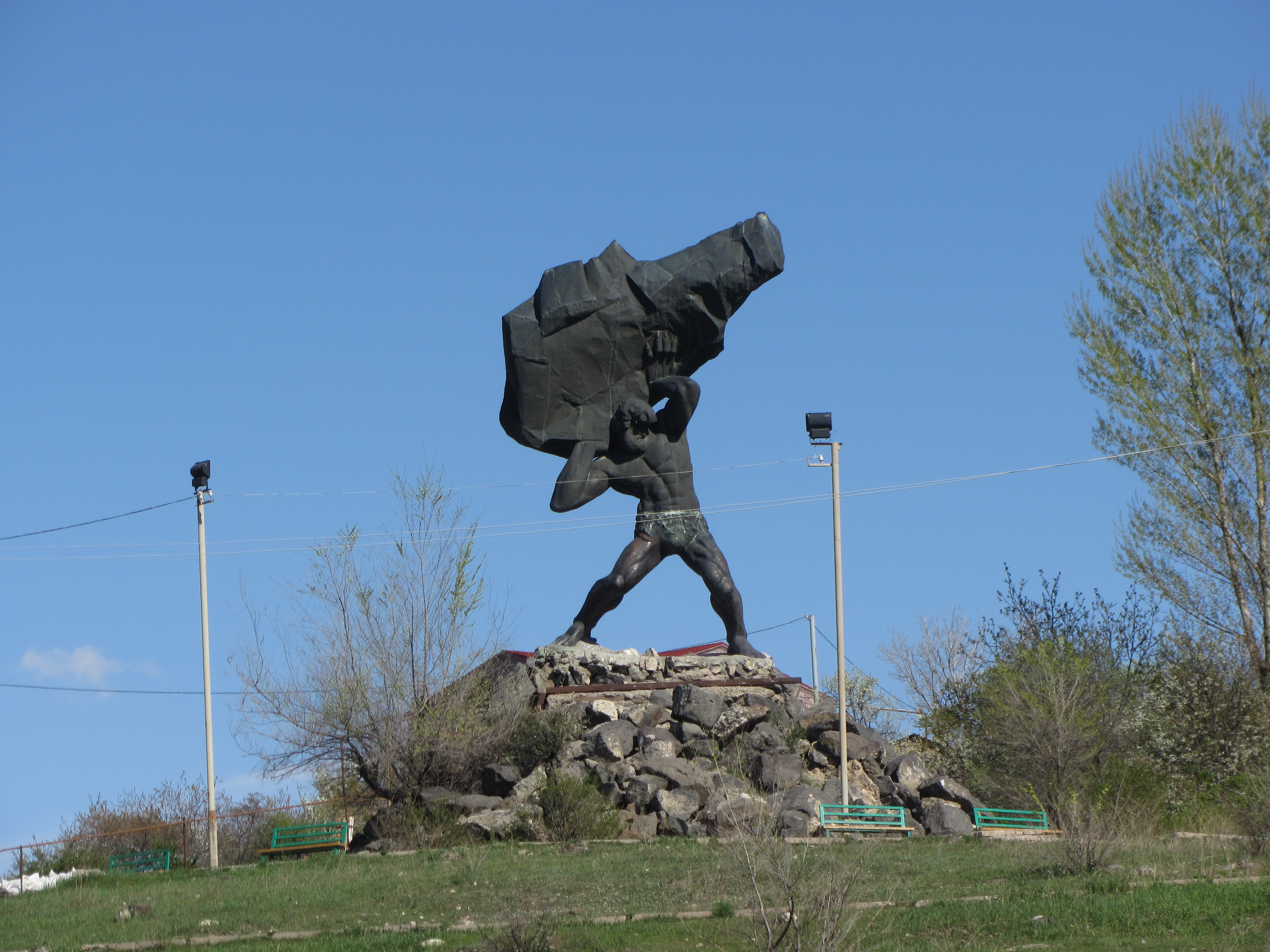
The statue of Tork Angegh in Nor Nork

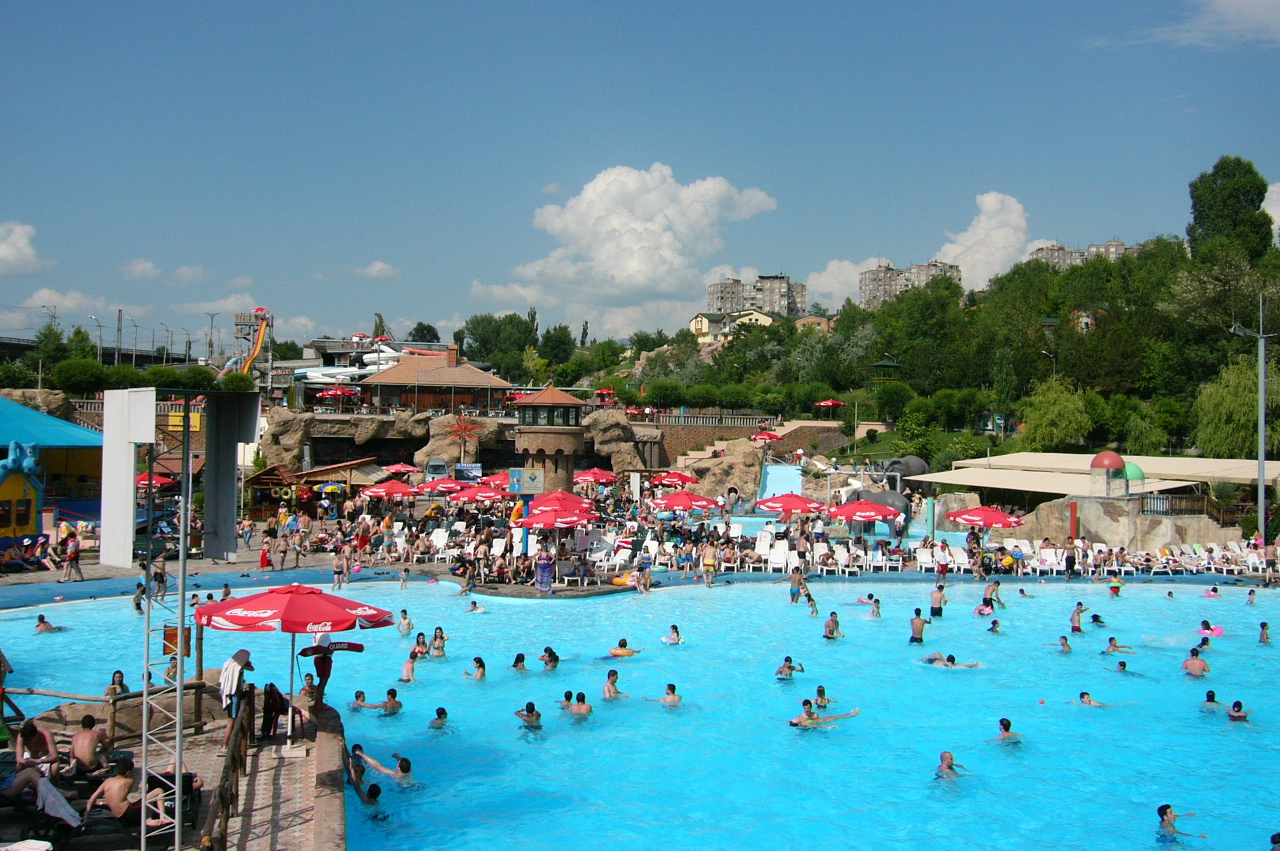
Yerevan Water World

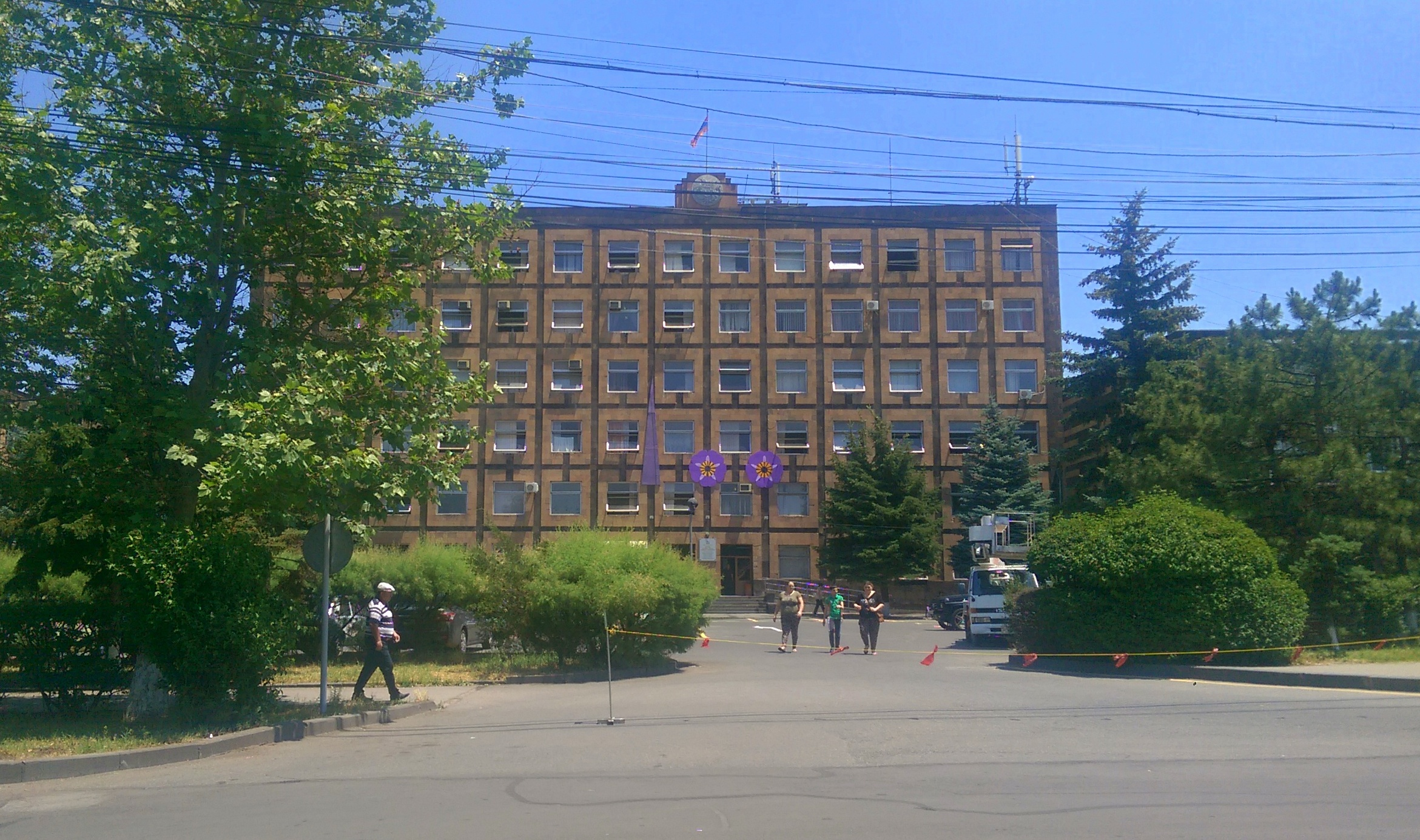
The administrative building of Nor Nork district

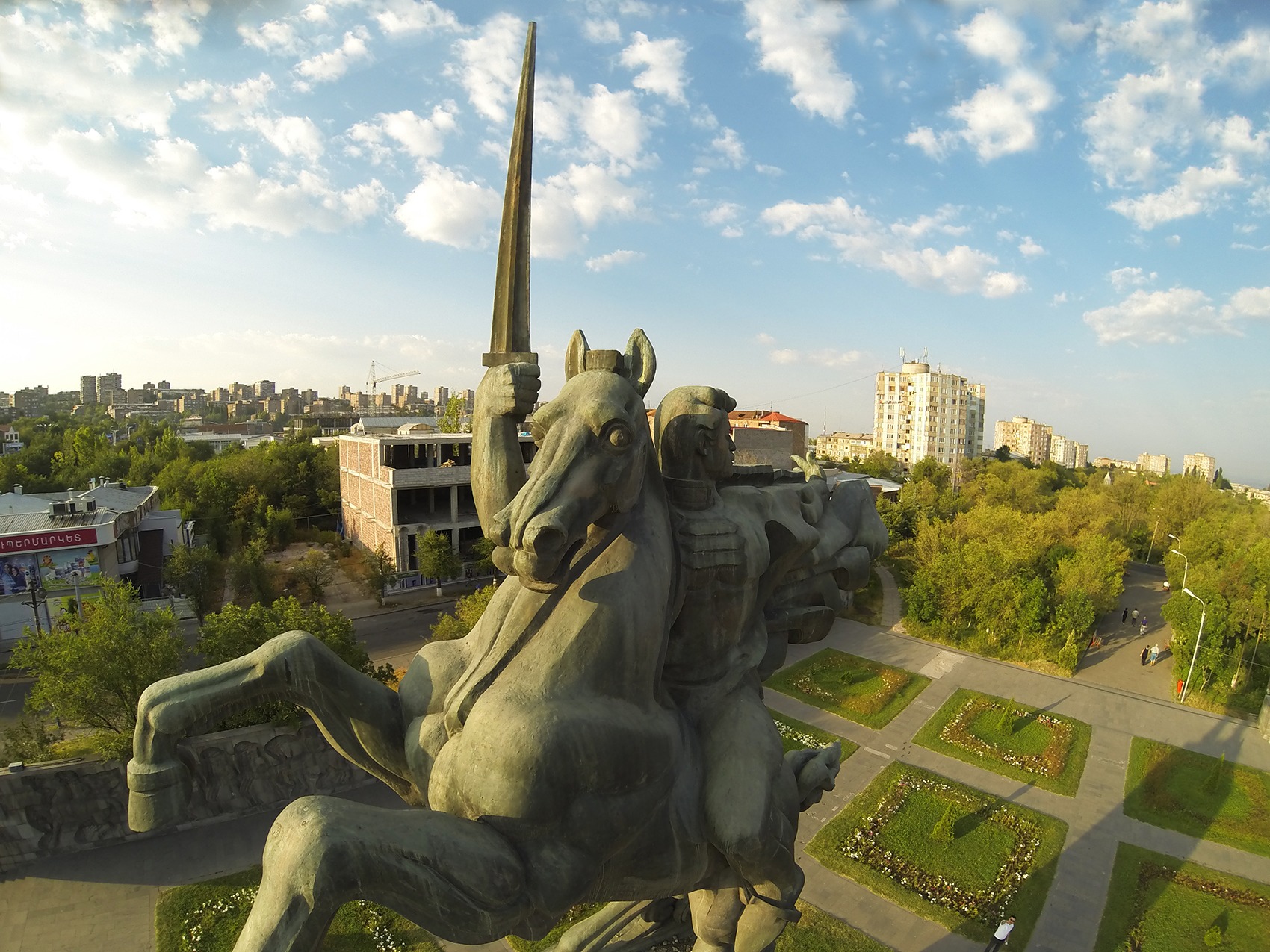
The statue of Hayk Bzhishkyan

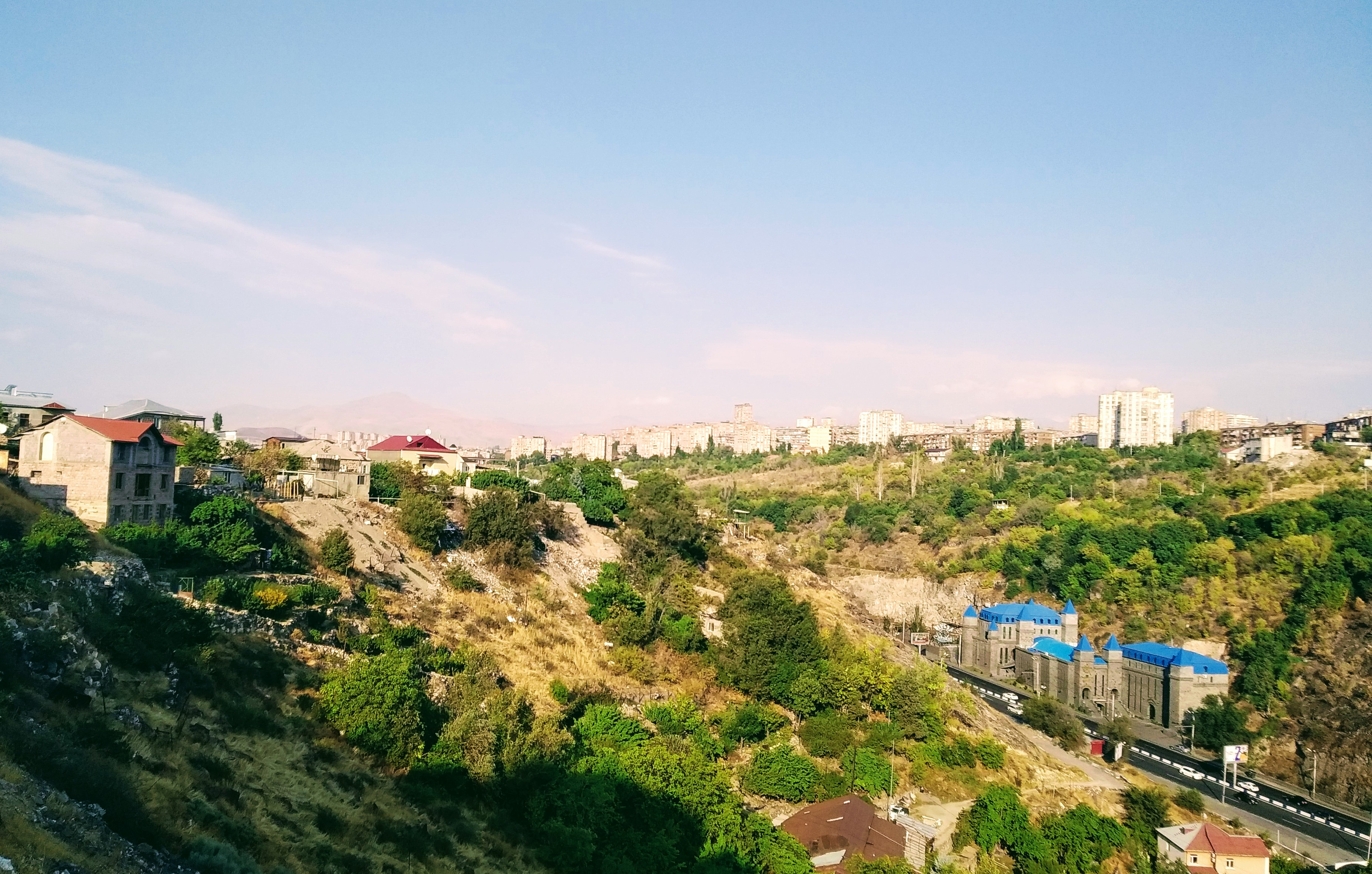
The heights of Nor Nork
