= Mkhitar Mnatsakanyan =

Armenian politician

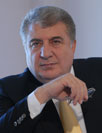

Labor and Social Affairs Ministers of Armenia
- In office November 23, 2009 – June 23, 2010
- President: Serzh Sargsyan
- Preceded by: Gevorg Petrosyan
- Succeeded by: Arthur Gregorian

Personal details
- Born: Mkhitar Edvard Mnatsakanyan; January 1, 1959 (age 67) Sevan, Soviet Armenia
- Children: 2
- Education: Yerevan State Medical University

Mkhitar Mnatsakanyan (Armenian: Մխիթար Էդվարդի Մնացականյան; born on 16 June 1950 in Sevan, Armenia) is an Armenian politician. On November 23, 2009, Armenian president Serzh Sargsyan appointed Mkhitar Mnatsakanyan as the Republic's Labour and Social Affairs Minister.

== Education and career ==
Mnatsakanyan graduated from Yerevan State Medical University with Master's degree of Medical Sciences in 1972 and in 1984 became a graduate of the Ministry of Internal Affairs Management University with Master's in sport. After graduating from the Yerevan State Medical University, Mnatsakanyan served as a surgeon and inter until 1975 and from that year and until 1977 was a forensic expert at one of the districts of Aparan-Aragats. He also served as an administrative director of the Red Cross's International Post Trauma Rehabilitation Center from 1994 to 1995, and from 1995 to 2001 served as general director of the same center, before becoming president of the Armenian Red Cross Society at which post he served until 2007.

On May 12, 2007 Mnatsakanyan was elected as deputy of the National Assembly from the Prosperous Armenia party. On December 6, 2007 he was elected Chairman of the National Assembly Standing Committee on Protection of Human Rights and Public Affairs. From November 23, 2009 to June 23, 2010, he also served as Minister of Labor and Social Affairs of Armenia. Mnatskanyan is married, and has two children and four grandchildren. Mnatsakanyan is an Honorable Professor of European University and a member of both the Russian Academy of Medical and Technical Sciences and of the Russian Academy of Natural Sciences.
