= Gevorg Petrosyan (politician) =

Armenian lawyer and politician

Member of the National Assembly
- Incumbent
- Assumed office 2007

Labor and Social Affairs Ministers of Armenia
- In office May 12, 2009 – November 23, 2009
- President: Serzh Sargsyan
- Preceded by: Arsen Hambardzumyan
- Succeeded by: Mkhitar Mnatsakanyan

Personal details
- Born: Gevorg Volodya Petrosyan; September 4, 1972 (age 54) Yerevan, Soviet Armenia
- Party: Independent
- Children: 3
- Education: Yerevan State University

Gevorg Volodya Petrosyan (Armenian: Գևորգ Վոլոդյայի Պետրոսյան, born in Yerevan on September 4, 1972, is an Armenian lawyer and politician, former Minister of Labor and Social Affairs.

== Early life and education ==
Petrosyan was born in 1972 in Yerevan where he attended secondary school No. 170. After graduation from it in 1989, he studied at the Yerevan State University Faculty of Law, from which he graduated in 1995. The same year he graduated, Petrosyan took part in the military training assemblies and received the military rank of an officer and following it, entered YSU postgraduate course. From 1996 to 2001, Petrosyan was the Dean of the Faculty of Law at Yerevan University after Grigor Zohrap and in between those years was a professor of law at Yerevan State University since 1996 and was a member of the RA Bar Association since 1998. The same year, Petrosyan became a Ph.D. Candidate of Judicial Sciences and Reserve Lieutenant, and after dissertation of his thesis and obtaining of a degree, he was appointed assistant at YSU Chair of Civil Law.

== Career ==
From 2002 to 2005, Petrosyan served as the head of the Department of Social Sciences at Vanadzor State University. Between those years, since 2003, he also served as associate professor of the Faculty of Law and the Chair of Civic Procedure of Yerevan State University and between 2004 and 2005, worked as Advisor to the Head of the Community at Nor Nork District, promoting soon after to the Chief of Staff position. From 2005 to 2009, Petrosyan served as jurist to the Direct General at Veon Armenia CJSC, and later as senior expert on Labor Law Affairs. Between 2007 and 2008, he worked as Head of the Legal Supervision Department at the Audit Chamber of Armenia.

He is the coauthor of school textbooks State and Fundamentals of Law (1998) and State and Law (2001), and the author of the university textbook Labor Law in the Republic of Armenia (2009). He is the author of more than two dozens of scholarly articles and publications.

Petrosyan has been a member of "Bargavach Hayastan" Party (Prosperous Armenia) since 2006.

In 2007, he was elected (in 2009 reelected) member of the Prosperous Armenia Political Party.

Petrosyan was appointed the RA Minister of Labor and Social Affairs, according to the RA President's No.:NH-119-A Decree made on May 12, 2009.

In November 2019, Petrosyan signed a petition against Istanbul Convention, addressing the fact that Armenia has legislation that supports punishment for the domestic violence and that convention is unnecessary.
