= Zaruhi Batoyan =

Armenian politician, journalist and disability rights activist

- Զարուհի Բաթոյան
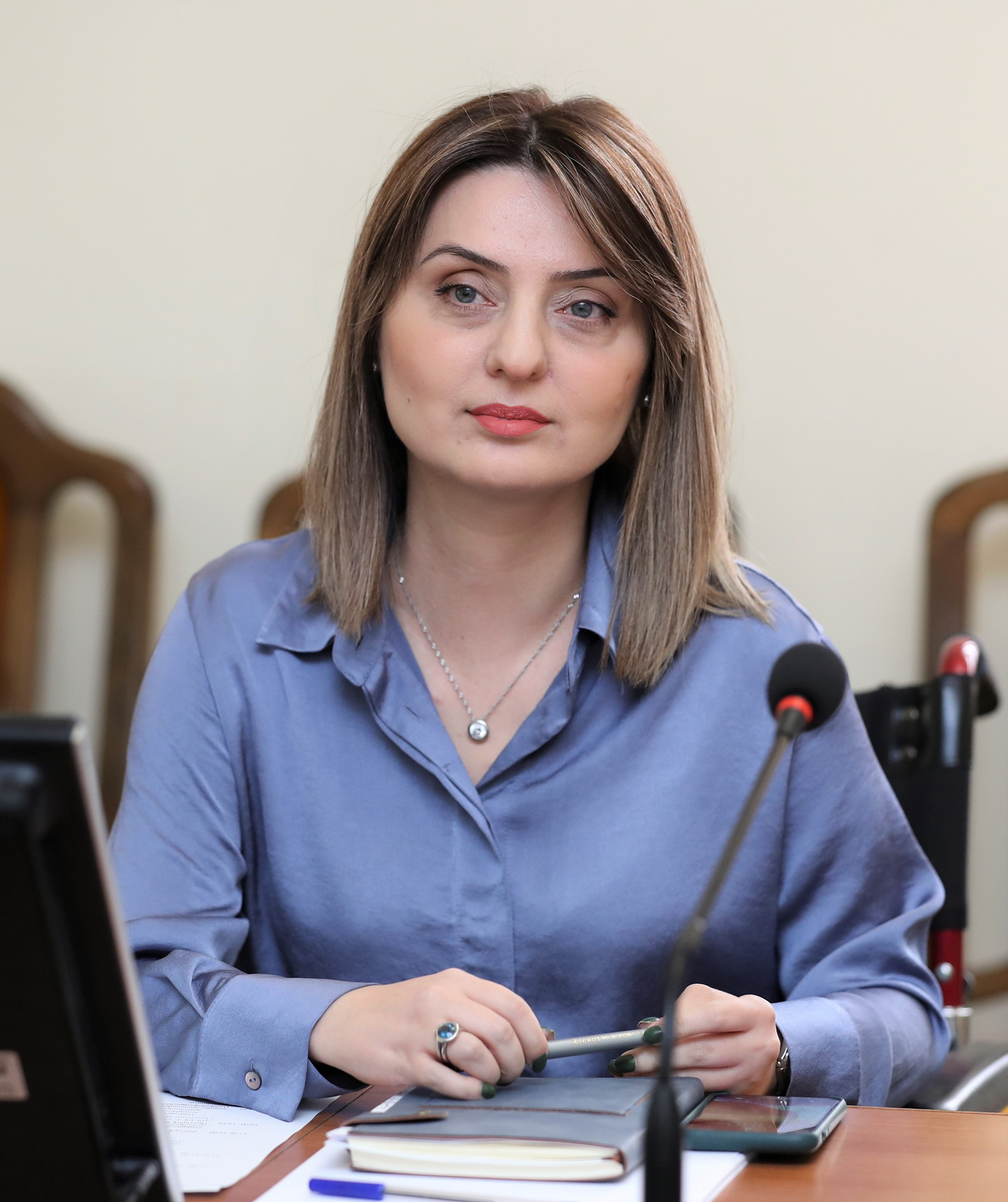
- Batoyan in 2022

Minister of Labor and Social Affairs
- In office 19 January 2019 – 20 November 2020
- President: Armen Sarkissian
- Prime Minister: Nikol Pashinyan
- Preceded by: Mane Tandilyan
- Succeeded by: Mesrop Arakelyan

Personal details
- Born: September 29, 1979 (age 46) Yerevan, Armenian SSR, Soviet Union
- Party: Civil Contract
- Education: Yerevan State University

Zaruhi Valeriani Batoyan (Armenian: Զարուհի Վալերիանի Բաթոյան; born 29 September 1979), is an Armenian politician, journalist and disability rights activist, and the former Minister of Labor and Social Affairs in the Second Pashinyan government.

== Biography ==
Zaruhi Batoyan was born in 1979 in Yerevan. In 2008, she graduated from the Department of Journalism at Yerevan State University. In 2012, she attended the Women's Institute on Leadership and Disability (WILD) training program offered by Mobility International USA in Eugene, Oregon.

From 1999 to 2014 she was the Editor-in-Chief of the children's magazine "Sunflower". Since 2007, she was responsible for the protection of the rights of people with disabilities in the NGO "Bridge of Hope". Since 2012, she has been the director of "Zartprint" LLC, which supports the employment of people with disabilities. Between 2013 and 2017, she coordinated the Union of Legal Entities "National Alliance for the Protection of Persons with Disabilities". She is the founding president of "Disability Info" NGO since 2014.

As an expert on the rights of persons with disabilities, she worked with the United Nations Development Programme, Armenia Caritas, Armenia Mission, Armenian branch of the Philharmonic Mission, Armenian branch of the British organization OXFAM and other organizations.

== Political career ==
On 30 October 2016, she was elected member of the Board of Civil Society Party. In 2017 she was elected member of the Yerevan Council of Elders for Way Out Alliance. On 11 June 2018 she was appointed Deputy Minister of Labor and Social Affairs until 18 January 2019. According to the decree of the President of Armenia Armen Sarkissian, she was appointed Minister of Labor and Social Affairs on 19 January 2019 and took office on 30 January. She is a wheelchair user.
