= Aghvan Vardanyan =

- Աղվան Վարդանյան
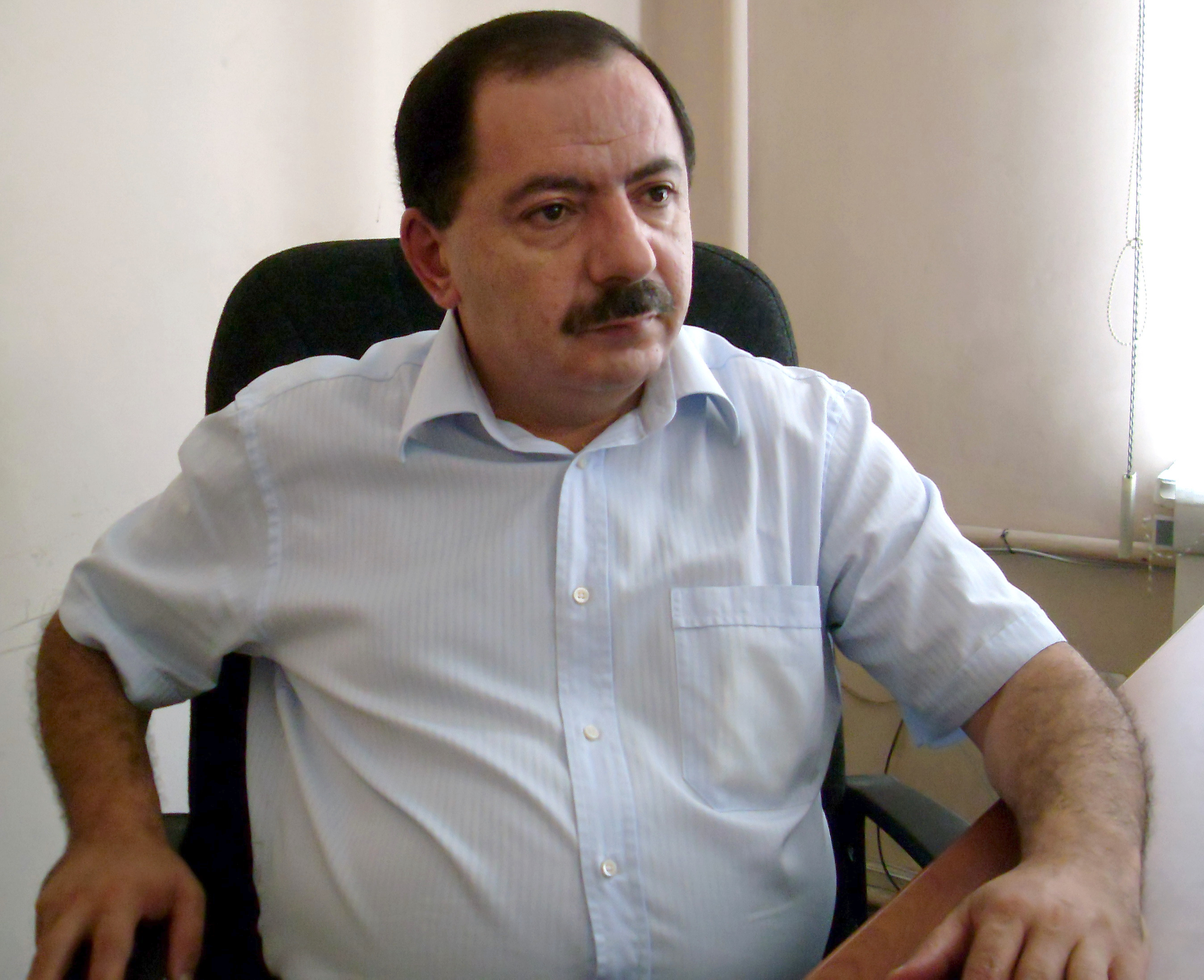

Labor and Social Affairs Ministers of Armenia
- In office June 11, 2003 – June 2, 2008
- President: Robert Kocharyan
- Preceded by: Razmik Martirosyan
- Succeeded by: Arsen Hambardzumyan

Personal details
- Born: October 7, 1958 (age 67) Gemur, Nakhichevan ASSR
- Party: Armenian Revolutionary Federation (1990-2018)
- Other political affiliations: Armenia Alliance
- Children: 2
- Education: Yerevan State University

Aghvan Arshaviri Vardanyan (Armenian: Աղվան Արշավիրի Վարդանյան; born on October 7, 1958) is an Armenian politician currently serving as a deputy of the National Assembly of Armenia as a member of the opposition Armenia Alliance. He served as minister of labor and social affairs from 2003 to 2008 under presidents Robert Kocharyan and Serzh Sargsyan.

== Biography ==
Vardanyan was born in 1958 in the village of Gemur in the Nakhichevan Autonomous Soviet Socialist Republic of the Azerbaijan SSR. He studied at Yerevan State University from 1977 to 1982 in the Faculty of Philology. From 1982 to 1987, Vardanyan served as the executive secretary of the Yerevan University newspaper. For the next three years, Vardanyan worked for Aghbyur and Garoun magazines, and in 1987, became a member of the Writers Union of Armenia. He joined Armenian Revolutionary Federation (ARF) party in 1990, and until 1993 served as secretary of the Writer's Union of Armenia. Between 1991 and 1993, Vardanyan served as the chief editor of the ARF newspaper Yerkir and from 1993 to 1994 was an employee of the radio station Azatutyun (the Armenian service of Radio Free Europe/Radio Liberty).

From 1994 to 1996, Vardanyan worked for the ARF magazine Droshak in Athens and between 1996 and 1999 served as chief editor of the Media Center Yerevan. In 1999, he was elected to the National Assembly of Armenia and that same year became a member of ARF Bureau, the party's highest decision-making body. In 2001, Vardanyan was elected a member of ARF Supreme Body and led the ARF's parliamentary faction. Two years later he was again elected to parliament and was appointed minister of labor and social affairs. On May 1, 2018, the ARF Supreme Council of Armenia announced that it was calling for Vardanyan to resign from his parliamentary post. This came after he declined to vote with the ARF faction for the election of Nikol Pashinyan as prime minister. On May 3, he resigned from his parliamentary post. On May 4, the ARF Supreme Council of Armenia announced of his dismissal from the ARF. Vardanyan was again elected to the National Assembly in the 2021 parliamentary election as a member of the Armenia Alliance led by former president Robert Kocharyan.
