= Arsen Hambardzumyan =

Armenian politician

Labor and Social Affairs Ministers of the Republic of Armenia
- In office June 2, 2008 – May 12, 2009
- President: Serzh Sargsyan
- Preceded by: Aghvan Vardanyan
- Succeeded by: Gevorg Petrosyan

Personal details
- Born: Arsen Khachik Hambardzumyan; June 30, 1973 (age 53) Yerevan, Armenian SSR, Soviet Union
- Children: 3
- Education: Yerevan State University

Arsen Khachik Hambardzumyan (Armenian: Արսեն Խաչիկի Համբարձումյան; born June 30, 1973, in Yerevan) is an Armenian politician.

== Biography ==
He graduated from the Yerevan State University Faculty of History and Postgraduate Course of YSU Chair of Armenian History. Hambardzumyan was a teacher at College after Aram Manukyan in Shushi from September to Novovember 1993, later worked as assistant at YSU Faculty of History (October–December 1995).

In 1998 and 1999, Hambardzumyan was a chief specialist at the Youth Affairs Department of the RA Ministry of Culture, Sport and Youth Affairs. From 1999 to 2005, he was a chief specialist of the NA Armenian Revolutionary Federation faction. In 2005-2008, he worked as Social Protection Sphere Loan Project Coordinator. In June 2008, Arsen Hambardzumyan was appointed RA Minister of Labor and Social Affairs. He was dismissed from office, according to the RA President’s Decree №: NH-117 –A, made on May 12, 2009.

He is the author of two research works and about 30 newspaper articles. He is one of the founders of the YSU Students' Trade Union, as well as member of the YSU First Students Council Presidency and Chairman of the Foreign Relations Committee. Hambardzumyan has been a member of Armenian Revolutionary Federation since 1992.
