= Yerevan Zoo =

- Zoo logo

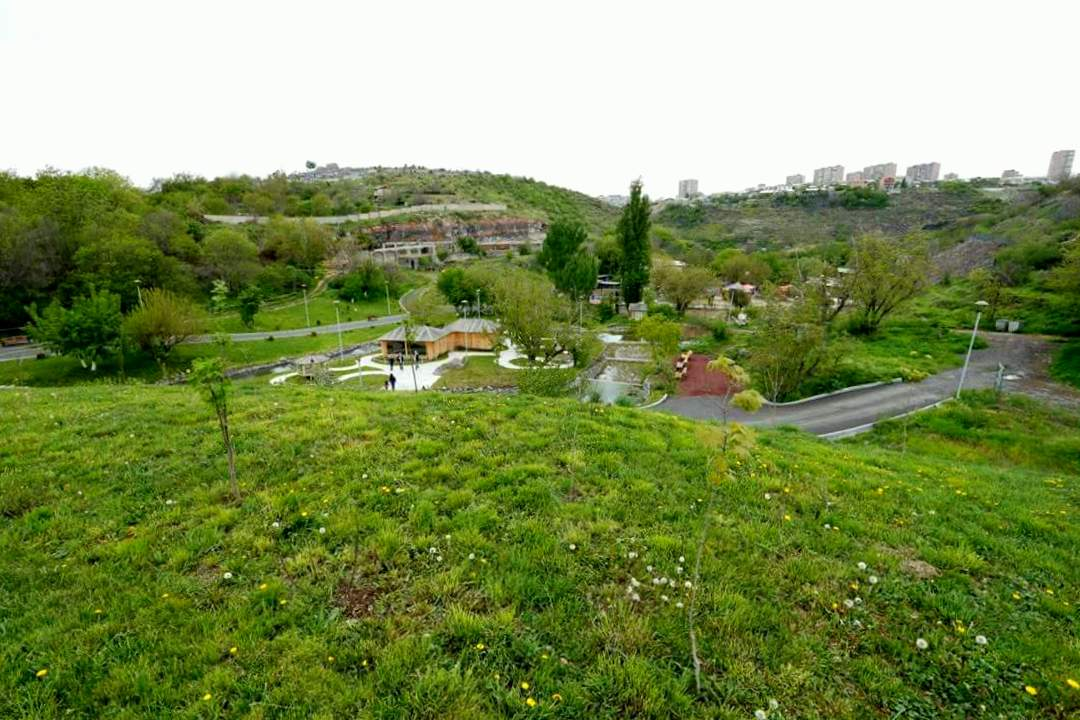
- Yerevan Zoo general view
- Interactive map of Yerevan Zoo
- 40°11′45.47″N 44°33′1.85″E
- Date opened: 1940
- Location: Yerevan, Armenia
- Land area: 35 hectares (86 acres)
- No. of animals: 3000+
- No. of species: 300
- Director: Edmond Ghazaryan
- Website: zoo.am

The Yerevan Zoo, also known as the Zoological Park of Yerevan (Armenian: Երևանի կենդաբանական այգի (Yerevani kendabanakan aygi)), is a zoological park in Yerevan, the capital of Armenia, that was founded in 1940 and is the only one in the country. It is located in the southeastern part of the city, at the foot of the hills, covering an area of 35 hectares (86 acres).

The main goals of the zoo are the preservation of the wild gene pool, the breeding of rare and endangered species in captivity, the study of climate training methods, the prevention of diseases, as well as the dissemination of environmental knowledge.

== History ==
The idea of creating a zoo in Yerevan arose back in the 1930s, but it was founded only in 1940 by the decision of the Supreme Council of the Armenian SSR. Construction began in 1941 and was completed in 1950.

The original site, just 3 hectares, housed about 20 native animals and birds. During the second reconstruction in 1975, the park's area increased to 35 hectares, diversifying its collection to include species from Africa, Asia, and the Americas, along with Armenia's own fauna. In the 1980s, the zoo reached its greatest diversity, numbering several hundred species. However, by the early 1990s, their numbers had declined by 90% as a result of the difficult political and economic situation in Armenia.

In the early 2010s, a large-scale reconstruction has been carried out. New enclosures were built, infrastructure was improved, and modern animal welfare standards were introduced. Programs to preserve rare species of the Caucasus are being implemented in collaboration with international organizations.

In 2022, the zoo reached a record number of visitors—over 750,000.

In 2024, construction of modern enclosures for African wild dogs and several other animals was completed. The new facilities were designed in accordance with European Association of Zoos and Aquaria (EAZA) requirements and include spacious open areas, shelters, and natural landscape elements. The official opening of the updated exhibits took place on May 1, 2024.

== Animals ==
At present the zoo is home to about 3000 individuals representing 300 species. Species representing the South Caucasus and Armenia include

- Syrian brown bears
- Bezoar goats
- vipers
- Armenian mouflon
- Red Deer and black vultures.

Other species at the zoo from around the world include

=== Carnivora ===
- African lions (including a white lion)
- Siberian tigers
- Leopards
- Meerkats
- Jaguars
- Interior Alaskan wolves
- Moon Bears
- Jungle cats
- Caucasian lynxs
- Spotted hyenas
- Nile crocodiles
- Pallas's cats

=== Artiodactyls ===
- Alpacas
- Llamas
- Barbary sheep
- Red deer
- Spotted deer
- Père David's deer
- Bactrian Camels

=== Odd-toed ungulates ===
- Zebras
- Przewalski’s Horses
- Shetland Ponys

=== Hippopotamuses ===
- Hippopotamus

=== Two-incisor marsupials ===
- Kangaroos

=== Proboscis ===
- Indian elephant named Hrantik.

=== Primates ===
- Mandrills
- Hamadryas baboons
- Saimiri boliviensiss
- Ring-tailed lemurs

=== Reptiles ===
- Yellow anaconda
- Asian Rock Python

== Conservation ==
Since Armenia is a biodiversity hot spot, the Foundation for the Preservation of Wildlife and Cultural Assets (FPWC) has leased and taken over management of about 839 hectares (2,070 acres) near the Khosrov reserve, which until recently had been unprotected and at risk of poaching, illegal logging, and overgrazing. The Yerevan Zoo is cooperating with the FPWC to use this land for wildlife rehabilitation and the reintroducing critically endangered species of the area into the wild.

== Education ==
In 2012 the zoo, in cooperation with the Foundation for the Preservation of Wildlife and Cultural Assets (FPWC), the municipality of Yerevan, and the Artis Zoo in Amsterdam, will open a zoo school. The main purpose of this school will be to teach schoolchildren the importance of biodiversity in Armenia and around the world, and it will use the zoo as an interactive classroom.
