= Ashot Yesayan =

Armenian politician

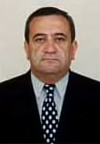

Labor and Social Affairs Ministers of Armenia
- In office 1991–1995
- President: Levon Ter-Petrosyan
- Succeeded by: Raphael Bagoyan

Personal details
- Born: Ashot Kolya Yesayan; 7 January 1959 (age 67) Leninakan, (now Gyumri), Shirak Province, Armenia
- Children: 1
- Education: Yerevan State University

Ashot Kolya Yesayan (Armenian: Աշոտ Կոլյայի Եսայան born 7 January 1951 in Gyumri) is an Armenian politician.

== Biography ==
Ashot Yesayan was born in Gyumri. In 1957-1967, he went to secondary school after Hovhannes Tumanyan in Gyumri. From 1968-1974, he studied at the Faculty of Law, Yerevan State University. In the years 1974 to 1987, he worked as an Inspector, Senior Inspector, Leading Inspector at the ASSR Ministry of Social Security. In 1981-1983, it was decreed that Yesayan was a Declaimer at the Chair of Social and Labor Eligibility at the All-Union Distance Learning Institute of Law (Moscow). In 1987-1990, he occupied the position of senior consultant in the Forgiveness Department of the Armenian SSR Supreme Council Presidium. On 20 September 1990 RA Supreme Council assigned Ashot Yesayan Minister of Labor and Social Security of Armenia. From October 1995 till August 1997, he was appointed the Deputy Minister of Labor and Social Security of Armenia. In the period from 23 January 1999 to February 2000, he was Chief Assistant to the RA General Prosecutor, simultaneously holding the post of the Head of the RA General Prosecutor's Secretariat. On 15 March 1999 he got the classification Grade of Counselor of the 2nd class. On 21 February 2000 Ashot Yesayan was appointed the Deputy Minister of Social Security of Armenia by the Prime Minister Decision and the First Deputy Minister of Social Security of Armenia since 17 July 2000. In the years 1990 to 1995, the Pension and Employment Fund (present-day State Social Security Service), Employment and Social Services were founded under his direct supervision, as well as hundreds of laws and sub legislative acts have been developed and presented to the consideration of the RA National Assembly and RA Government, and the concept of social policy in the transition period towards free market was realized and the social policy program implemented in the period 1992-1995. Besides that, Ashot Yesayan was the ideologist and coordinator of Paros System Implementation (grading system of needy people). He is the author of nearly one hundred articles. On Yesayan’s own initiative, Armenia has become a member of the International Labor Organization since November 1993. Here is the list of the posts Ashot Yesayan once held: Co-president of Armenia's Orphanages Foundation (1993), Head of the public organization Hraparak aimed at social dialogue and support (since 1997), independent expert of the UN Development Agency (1999). Ashot Yesayan marked the social situation of the past 5 years in the Republic, especially meeting the poverty reduction objectives. Moreover, it was recognized the first among all HDR reports and got 2 prizes out of 4 in the year 2000 (Brazil). He has been the President of the Board of Trustees of SOS Children's Villages Armenian Charity Foundation since 1997. During the years 1998-2000, Ashot Yesayan headed the Project “Struggle against children's begging” implemented by the Fund of Armenian Relief. He has been Deputy Team Leader of the Government's PRSP since 2001; thus he led the PRSP Group responsible for drafting technical tasks. Ashot Yesayan was also a member at Human Rights' Office under the RA President, at the local self-government offices' and the RA charitable programs' committees.
