= Hranush Hakobyan =

Armenian politician

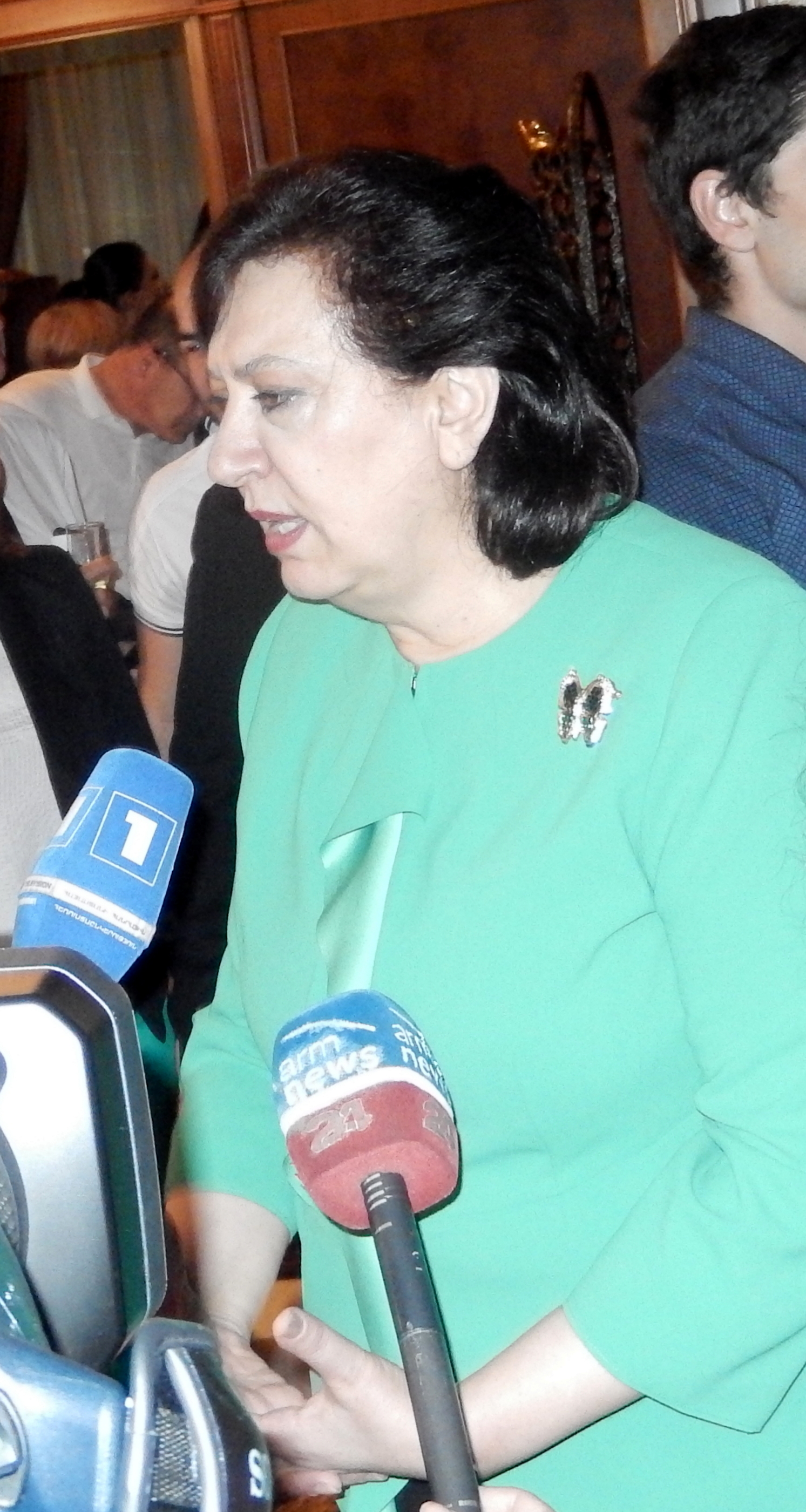

Diaspora Minister of Armenia
- In office 1 October 2008 – 23 April 2018
- President: Serzh Sargsyan; Armen Sarkissian
- Prime Minister: Tigran Sargsyan; Hovik Abrahamyan; Karen Karapetyan; Serzh Sargsyan; Karen Karapetyan; Nikol Pashinyan(acting)
- Preceded by: position created
- Succeeded by: Mkhitar Hayrapetyan

Minister of Social Security
- In office 1996–1998
- President: Levon Ter-Petrosyan
- Preceded by: Raphael Bagoyan
- Succeeded by: Gagik Yeganyan

Member of the National Assembly of Armenia

Personal details
- Born: 12 April 1954 (age 72) Sarukhan, Gegharkunik Province

Hranush Hrant Hakobyan (Armenian: Հրանուշ Հրանտի Հակոբյան) is an Armenian politician who was the longest-serving woman in the National Assembly of Armenia. She was the first Armenian woman to be "directly elected" into office by the Armenian people instead of "being appointed by a political party".

She became the long-standing Minister of the Diaspora for many years, before the said ministry was abolished. In 2005, she sponsored Armenia's "gender-quota law" in order to encourage the participation and election of more women in the politics of Armenia.

== Biography ==
Hranush Hrant Hakobyan

Hranush Hakobyan (a mathematician, lawyer, political scientist, non-partisan) was born on 12 April 1954 in the village of Sarukhan in Kamo Region.

- In 1975, she graduated from the YSU Applied Mathematics Department, later in 1989, from Moscow Academy of Political Sciences.
- In 1994, Hranush Hakobyan graduated from the YSU Law Department. She is a Doctor-Professor of Law, Associate Professor, Professor at the State University of Gavar.
- In 1986, she was awarded with the order of “People’s Friendship”.
- In the period of 1975–1983, she was a professor at Yerevan State University.
- In 1978–1983, Hranush Hakobyan was appointed Deputy Secretary, Secretary at the Komsomol Committee of Yerevan State University.
- In 1983–1990, she became Secretary, First Secretary of the Komsomol of Armenia, a member of Komsomol Central Committee Bureau.
- Hranush Hakobyan once occupied the following positions: Deputy of the Supreme Council of the Arm SSR, a member of the Presidium of the Supreme Council (1986-1990), Deputy at the Supreme Council, Deputy Chairwoman of the Standing Committee of the Supreme Council on Social and Healthcare Affairs (1990-1995), Member of the National Assembly, Head of the Standing Committee on Social, Healthcare and Environmental Affairs at the National Assembly (1995-1996).
- She was a member of the grouping “Republic”, Deputy Chairwoman of the CIS Inter-parliamentary Assembly Social Affairs Commission (1995-1996).
- In 1996–1998, Hranush Hakobyan was appointed the RA Minister of Social Security.
- She has been a member of Inter-parliamentary Union since 1996, a member of the Women's Affairs Coordinating Council and the Head of the Armenian Delegation since 2003.
- In the years 1999–2003, she was a Member of the National Assembly, and also a member of the National Assembly Standing Committee on Foreign Affairs.
- In 2001, she became Secretary of Parliamentary Group called People's Deputy.
- On 25 May 2003 she was elected a Member of the National Assembly, Head of the National Assembly Standing Committee on Science, Education, Culture and Youth Affairs. Hranush Hakobyan is a member of the Republican Party of Armenia.
- She also occupied the post of the Chair of the Armenian Women's International Association, co-chair of the Association of Women's Health, Trustee of Yerevan, Cambridge-Yerevan, Armenia's Orphanages Fund, Co-chair of the Board of trustees of US-Armenia Health Care Center.
- She is the author of 2 books and 25 research papers.

== See also ==
- Mariam Vardanian
