= Artem Asatryan =

Armenian politician

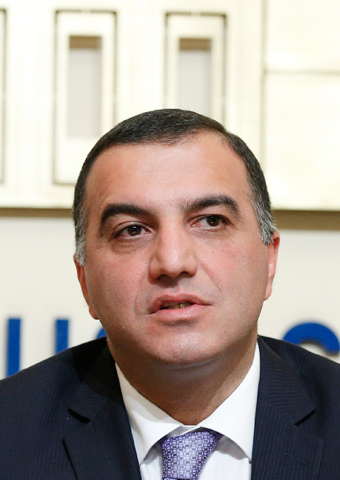

Minister of Labor and Social Affairs of Armenia
- In office June 16, 2012 – May 12, 2018
- President: Serzh Sargsyan; Armen Sarkissian
- Prime Minister: Tigran Sargsyan; Hovik Abrahamyan; Karen Karapetyan; Serzh Sargsyan; Karen Karapetyan (acting); Nikol Pashinyan
- Preceded by: Arthur Gregorian
- Succeeded by: Mane Tandilyan

Personal details
- Born: Artem Janik Asatryan; May 23, 1972 (age 54) Yerevan, Armenian SSR, Soviet Union
- Children: 3
- Education: Yerevan Institute of National Economy

Artem Janik Asatryan (Armenian: Արտեմ Ջանիկի Ասատրյան; born May 23, 1972, in Yerevan) is an Armenian politician.

== Biography ==
From 1979 to 1989, Asatryan finished secondary school No. 194 in Yerevan with gold medal. After his graduation from Yerevan Institute of National Economy in 1994, where he got a degree in economics, specializing in State Regulation of Economics, he served in the Armed Forces of Armenia. From 1995 to 1997, Asatryan studied at the Public Administration Academy of Armenia where he also served as public servant, specializing in State and Local Self-Governance.

Between 2000 and 2003, Asatryan attended the Postgraduate course at the Public Administration Academy of Armenia and the Economic Research Institute of Armenia. Following it, he defended his thesis on "The RA Social Security Key Issues in Poverty Reduction" and got his Academic Degree of Doctor in Economics. Following graduation, he received training at Harvard University (USA), the World Bank Institute, as well as in a group of educational institutions in Sweden, Poland, Austria, Israel, Bulgaria and Ukraine.

An author of numerous scientific articles, analyses and research papers, Asatryan is also known for his work as Head of a Department of the Armenian Pension and Employment Fund where he works since 1998. That year, he also began his service as the Head of Pension Insurance and Social Security Department of the RA Ministry of Labor and Social Affairs, serving as such until 2006. From 2006 to 2007, he headed the National Institute of Labor and Social Research and in 2007 Asatryan was appointed Deputy Minister of Labor and Social Affairs of Armenia. During his service as Deputy Minister, he coordinated a number of strategic areas and as of March 2011, simultaneously heads the State Social Security Service.

Asatryan also heads the Management Board of Pension Reforms in Armenia where he specializes in various strategies, concepts, laws, government draft solutions and other documents providing pension system reform implementation as well as the introduction of social security cards and personified registration system that have been developed under his supervision.

In 2008, Asatryan was awarded an Anania Shirakatsi Medal by the RA President's Decree for efficient service in the RA State Government System.

He received Prime Minister's Memorial Medal, numerous awards and certificates for effective management.

In May 2004 he got the classification Grade of Counselor of the 1st class. On June 16, 2012, Artem Asatryan was appointed the RA Minister of Labor and Social Affairs.

He speaks Russian and English.

Asatryan is a member of the Republican Party of Armenia.
