= Razmik Martirosyan =

Armenian politician

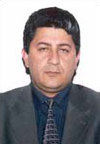

Minister Republic Of Armenia
- In office 1999–2003
- President: Robert Kocharyan
- Preceded by: Gagik Yeganyan
- Succeeded by: Aghvan Vardanyan

Personal details
- Born: Razmik Martirosi Martirosyan; 24 May 1959 (age 67) Vosketap,
- Party: Republican Party of Armenia
- Children: 4
- Education: Yerevan State University

Razmik Martirosi Martirosyan (Armenian: Ռազմիկ Մարտիրոսի Մարտիրոսյան; born 24 May 1959 ) is an Armenian Politician.

== Biography ==
Martirosyan was born in the village of Vosketap of the Ararat Region. He is a member of the Republican Party of Armenia, as well as a member of the Union of “Yerkrapah” Volunteers. In 1976, he finished the local school and entered the YSU Faculty of History from which he graduated in 1981. Between 1981 and 1984, Martirosyan was a teacher of History at secondary school of Vosketap and from 1984 to 1985, he worked as school organizer, eventually becoming an Instructor of the Staff Department of Ararat Regional Committee of Komsomol. From 1985 to 1987, he served in the Soviet armed forces as an officer and civil worker. After demobilization, in 1987 to 1988 he worked as an instructor at №2 secondary school of Ararat village.

In 1988-1993, Razmik Martirosyan was the principal of secondary school of the village Yeghegnavan, Ararat Region. In December 1992, Razmik Martirosyan was elected Deputy of the RA Supreme Council, then in 1993 became a member of the Standing Committee on Local Self-Government Affairs. In 1995, he was elected as Republic of Armenia's National Assembly Deputy and since March 1998, serves as Head of the Republic of Armenia's National Assembly Standing Committee of Defense, National Security and Internal Affairs. In 1999, Martirosyan was elected Republic of Armenia's National Assembly Deputy, and on 19 June he became the Minister of Social Security. He held the post till February 2000, and, shortly afterwards, he was again in office until May 2003. In 2003, Martirosyan was elected Deputy of the National Assembly of the Republic of Armenia.
