= Ishkhan Saghatelyan =

Former vice president of the National Assembly of Armenia (born 1982)

- Իշխան Սաղաթելյան
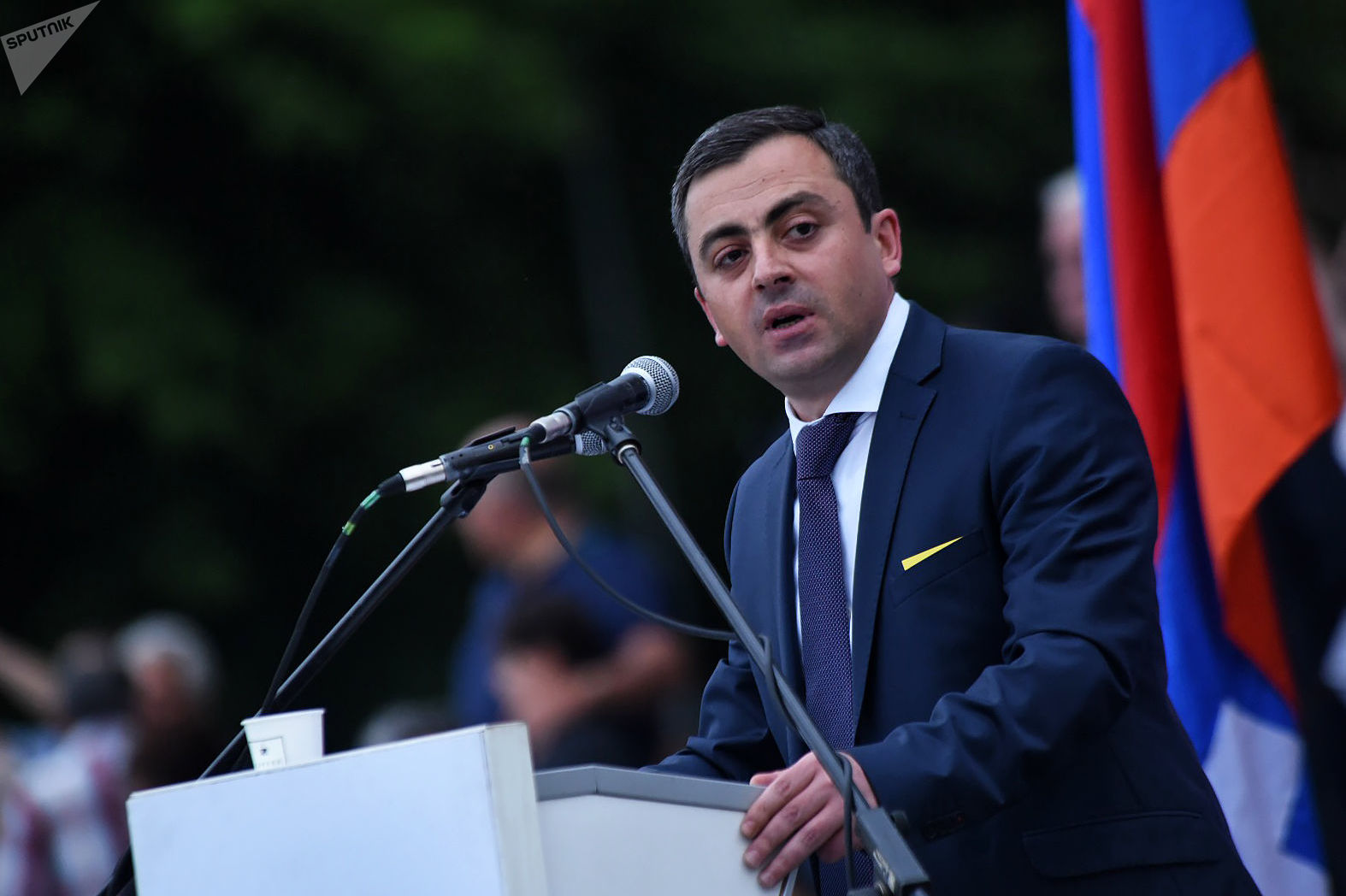
- Saghatelyan in 2020

Member of the National Assembly of Armenia
- Incumbent
- Assumed office August 2, 2021
- Parliamentary group: Armenia Alliance

Vice President of the National Assembly of Armenia
- In office August 6, 2021 – July 2, 2022 Serving with Hakob Arshakyan and Ruben Rubinyan
- President: Alen Simonyan
- Preceded by: Alen Simonyan; Lena Nazaryan; Vahe Enfiajyan

Governor of Gegharkunik Province
- In office June 1, 2018 – October 3, 2018
- Preceded by: Karen Botoyan
- Succeeded by: Gnel Sanosyan

Personal details
- Born: May 6, 1982 (age 44) Geghamavan, Armenian SSR, Soviet Union
- Party: Armenian Revolutionary Federation
- Education: Yerevan State University; Armenian National Academy of Sciences
- Occupation: Politician, political scientist

Ishkhan Vachiki Saghatelyan (Armenian: Իշխան Վաչիկի Սաղաթելյան; born May 6, 1982) is an Armenian politician who has served as a deputy in the National Assembly of Armenia from the opposition Armenia Alliance since August 2, 2021. He served as deputy speaker the National Assembly from August 6, 2021 until his removal from the position on July 2, 2022. He is the current chair of the Supreme Council of Armenia of the Armenian Revolutionary Federation (ARF).

He served as the governor of Gegharkunik Province from June 1, 2018, until October 3, 2018. Saghatelyan was the lead coordinator of the Homeland Salvation Movement, which led protests calling for the resignation of Prime Minister Nikol Pashinyan after the end of the 2020 Nagorno-Karabakh war.

Saghatelyan is one of the leaders of the Armenia Alliance, an electoral coalition between the ARF, ex-president of Armenia Robert Kocharyan, and the newly established Reborn Armenia party. The coalition came in second in the 2021 Armenian parliamentary election held on June 20, 2021.

== Biography ==
Ishkhan Saghatelyan was born on May 6, 1982, in the village of Geghamavan in the former Sevan region of the Armenian SSR (now located in the Gegharkunik Province of Armenia). In 1999, he graduated from Yerevan School No. 145, and in 2003 graduated from the Faculty of International Relations of Yerevan State University, where he also received his master's degree in 2005. In 2008, he defended his doctoral thesis at the Institute of History of the Armenian National Academy of Sciences and received the degree of Candidate of Historical Sciences.

Saghatelyan has been a member of the Armenian Revolutionary Federation since 1999. From 2002 to 2006 he was the chairman of the ARF "Nikol Aghbalyan" student union. From 2006 to 2007 and since 2016, he has been a member of the Supreme Council of Armenia of the ARF. From 2008 to 2009 he worked at the National Assembly of Armenia as an advisor to the Vice President of the National Assembly, and then from 2009 to 2012 as an advisor to a member of parliament. Starting from December 2016 he served as an advisor to the minister of the environment. During the 2018 Armenian parliamentary election, he was the ARF's candidate for the eighth electoral district of Gegharkunik province. He was appointed governor of Gegharkunik province on June 1, 2018, and dismissed on October 3, 2018.

Following the defeat of the Armenian side in the 2020 Nagorno-Karabakh war, Saghatelyan became one of the main leaders of the 2020–2021 Armenian protests and the lead coordinator of the Homeland Salvation Movement, the coalition of opposition parties calling for Prime Minister Nikol Pashinyan's resignation and proposing Vazgen Manukyan as an interim prime minister. He was arrested on November 12, 2020, for organizing protests in violation of the martial law in place at the time and was released a day later.

Although the Homeland Salvation Movement was opposed to participating in elections held under Prime Minister Pashinyan, on May 6, 2021, Saghatelyan announced that the ARF had formed an electoral alliance with the newly created Reborn Armenia party and the second president of Armenia Robert Kocharyan, with the intention of participating in the snap parliamentary election in June 2021. Saghatelyan ran as the second candidate on the Armenia Alliance's electoral list, after Robert Kocharyan. He was put forward as the parliamentary opposition's candidate for deputy speaker of parliament and was elected on August 6, 2021, after two failed attempts. He was removed from this post on July 2, 2022, for repeated absences.
