= Alen Simonyan =

Armenian politician (born 1980)

- Ալեն Սիմոնյան
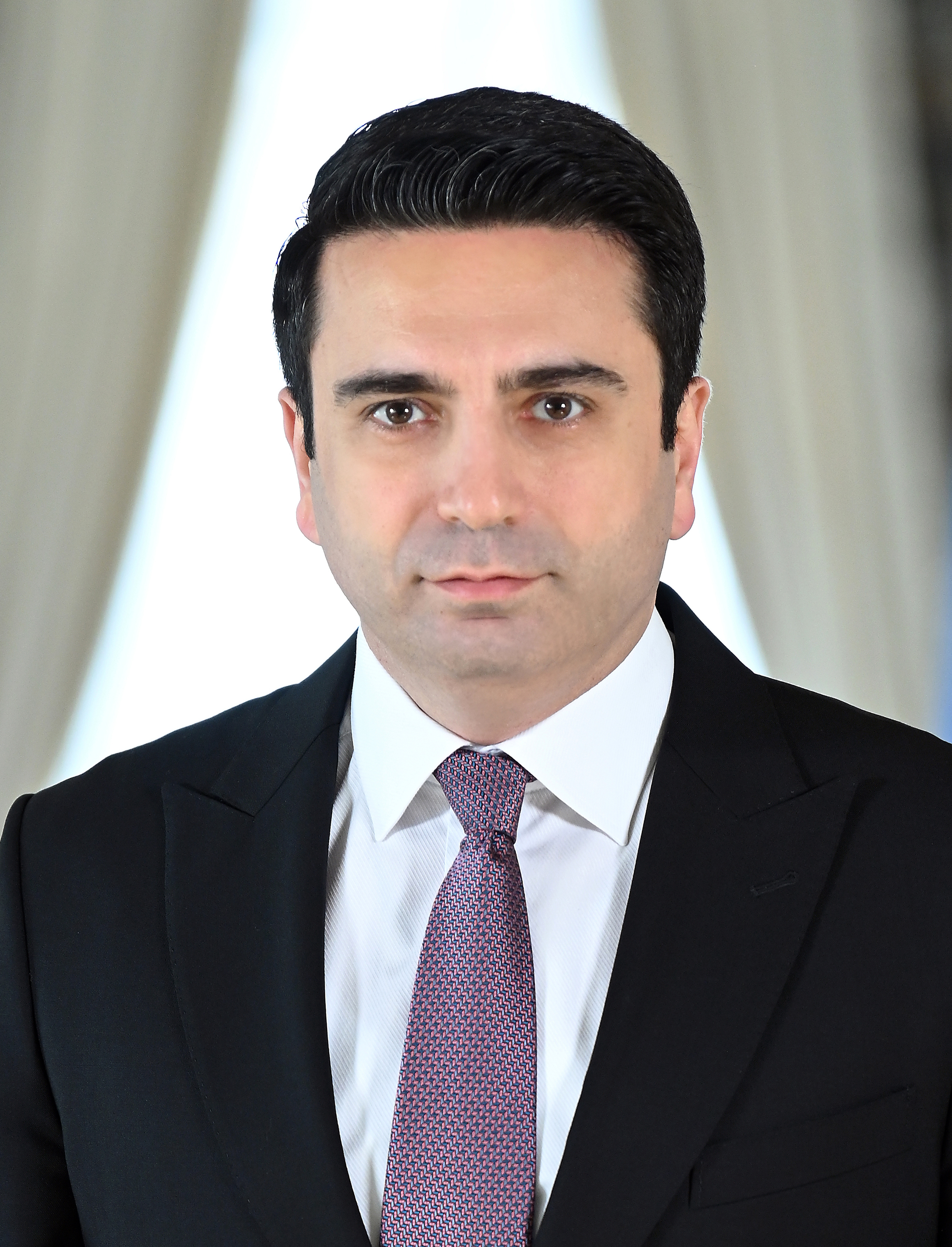
- Official portrait, 2022

Secretary of the Security Council of Armenia
- Incumbent
- Assumed office 13 August 2026
- President: Vahagn Khachaturyan
- Prime Minister: Nikol Pashinyan
- Preceded by: Armen Grigoryan

President of the National Assembly
- In office 2 August 2021 – 2 August 2026
- President: Armen Sarkissian; Vahagn Khachaturyan
- Preceded by: Ararat Mirzoyan
- Succeeded by: Ruben Rubinyan

Acting President of Armenia
- In office 1 February 2022 – 13 March 2022
- Prime Minister: Nikol Pashinyan
- Preceded by: Armen Sarkissian
- Succeeded by: Vahagn Khachaturyan

Vice President of the National Assembly of Armenia
- In office 15 January 2019 – 2 August 2021 Serving with Lena Nazaryan and Vahe Enfiajyan
- President: Ararat Mirzoyan
- Preceded by: Eduard Sharmazanov; Arpine Hovhannisyan; Mikayel Melkumyan

Member of the National Assembly
- In office 16 May 2018 – 2 August 2026

Member of the Yerevan City Council
- In office 2017–2018

Personal details
- Born: Alen Roberti Simonyan; 5 January 1980 (age 46) Yerevan, Armenian SSR, Soviet Union
- Party: Civil Contract
- Spouse: Mariam Margaryan (div. 2025)
- Children: 3
- Education: Yerevan State University

Military service
- Allegiance: Armenia
- Branch/service: Armenian Ground Forces
- Years of service: 2000–2002
- Rank: Sergeant

Alen Roberti Simonyan (Armenian: Ալեն Ռոբերտի Սիմոնյան; born 5 January 1980) is an Armenian politician who served as the president of the National Assembly of Armenia from 2 August 2021 to 2 August 2026. He served as the acting president of Armenia from 1 February 2022 to 13 March 2022, and is a former member of Yerevan City Council. He currently serves as the Secretary of the Security Council of Armenia since 13 August 2026.

== Career ==
=== Education and activities prior to politics ===
Simonyan studied at the Faculty of Law of Yerevan State University, graduating in 2000. He would go on to serve two years in the Armed Forces of Armenia, before becoming Assistant to the Chairman of the Court of the First Instance of Ajapnyak and Davitashen Communities. From 2003 to 2004, he worked as a human resources manager at Converse Bank.

From 2006 to 2007, Simonyan worked at a radio station. He then cooperated with television companies TV5, Yerkir Media, and Armenia TV for the next five years, directing and producing a number of musical and political video clips. In 2012, he became Editor-in-Chief of "Ararat" magazine before founding Ararat Media Group LLC (araratnews.am web site and "Ararat" magazine).

Simonyan was one of a number of organizers of the "Car free" civil protest against the rise in prices for transportation.

=== Political career ===
On 30 May 2015, he was elected member of the Civil Contract party board, becoming a spokesperson for the party. He was re-elected on 30 October 2016.

From 2017 to 2018, Simonyan was a member of the Yerevan City Council in the composition of Way Out Alliance. On 16 May 2018, he was elected Member of the National Assembly by the national electoral list of the Way Out Alliance. Later that year, on 9 December 2018, he was elected member of the National Assembly by the national electoral list of the My Step Alliance.

On 15 January 2019, he was elected vice president of the National Assembly, then president of the National Assembly on 2 August 2021. After the resignation of President Armen Sarkissian on 1 February 2022, Simonyan assumed the powers and duties of president of Armenia as acting president.

On 27 June 2024, Simonyan confirmed that Armenia's leadership wants the country to join the European Union and that it will hold a referendum in the near future. Simonyan stated "Our society has made a decision to be part of the European Union" and "I think that sometime in the near future we will have this referendum and I am sure that our people will say yes".

He was appointed Secretary of the Security Council of Armenia on 13 August 2026.

== Personal life ==
Simonyan was married to Mariam Margaryan. They have three children. They divorced in July 2025.

Political offices
| Preceded by Ararat Mirzoyan | President of the National Assembly of Armenia; 2021–present | Incumbent |
| Preceded by Armen Sarkissian | President of Armenia; Acting; 2022 | Succeeded by Vahagn Khachaturyan |
