= State Supervisory Service =

Armenian government agency

- Պետական վերահսկողական ծառայություն

Agency overview
- Formed: 2018
- Jurisdiction: Government of Armenia
- Headquarters: 47 Mashtots Avenue, Yerevan, Armenia
- Agency executive: Robert Bazikyan, Head of the State Supervisory Service
- Parent department: Prime Minister's Office
- Key document: Law of the Republic of Armenia "On State Control Service"
- Website: www.supervision.am

State Supervisory Service of the Republic of Armenia (Armenian: Հայաստանի Հանրապետության պետական վերահսկողության ծառայություն, romanized: Hayastani Hanrapetut’yan petakan verahskoghut’yan tsarrayut’yun) is a government agency accountable to the Prime Minister of Armenia and is responsible for monitoring the implementation of the powers vested in the Prime Minister throughout in Armenia. It is an official partner of the European Anti-Fraud Office. The Law of the Republic of Armenia "On State Control Service", adopted on March 30, 2018, establishes the legal framework for the State Supervisory Service.

== Structure ==
- Economic Sector Control Department
- Department for Supervision of Territorial Administration and Infrastructure Sectors
- Social Sector Supervision Department
- State and Legal Sector Supervision Department
- Procurement Process Control Department
- Information Systems, Database Management and Risk Assessment Department
- Application Review and Citizen Reception Department
- Internal Security and Control Department
- Internal Audit Department
- Department of Legal Support and Legality Supervision
- Inspection Supervision Department
- Department of Financial Budgetary Control and Financial Supervision
- Business Management and Procurement Department
- Accounting Department
- Personnel Management Department
- General Department
- First Department
- Information and Public Relations Department

== Heads ==
- Romanos Petrosyan (December 2021 - 17 July 2025)
- Robert Bazikyan (since 17 July 2025)

== See also ==
- National Security Service (Armenia)
- Foreign Intelligence Service
- Central Commission for Discipline Inspection
- Economic and Financial Crimes Commission
