= Lena Nazaryan =

Armenian journalist, politician (born 1983)

- Լենա Նազարյան
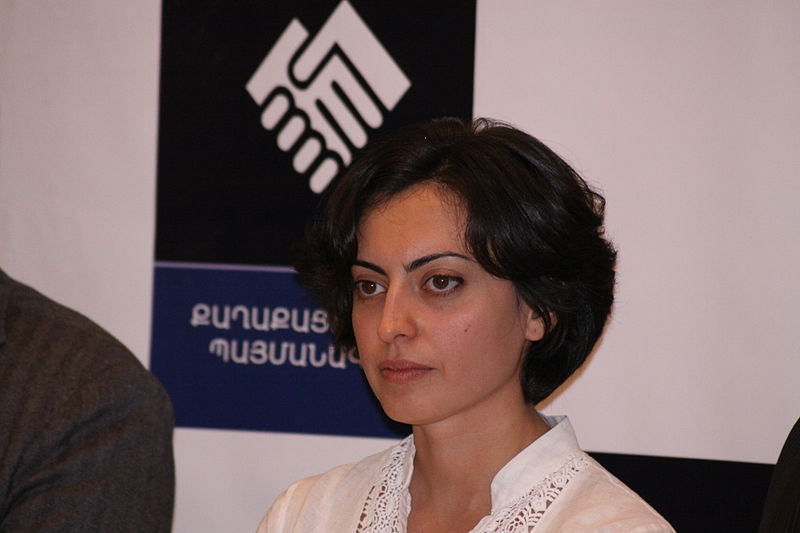

Vice President of National Assembly
- Incumbent
- Assumed office 15 January 2019 Serving with Alen Simonyan and Vahe Enfiajyan
- President: Ararat Mirzoyan
- Preceded by: Eduard Sharmazanov; Arpine Hovhannisyan; Mikayel Melkumyan

Member of the National Assembly of Armenia
- Incumbent
- Assumed office 2 April 2017

Personal details
- Born: March 9, 1983 (age 43) Yerevan, Armenian SSR, Soviet Union
- Party: Civil Contract
- Education: Yerevan State University

Lena Nazaryan (Armenian: Լենա Նազարյան; born 9 March 1983) is an Armenian politician and a member of the Armenian National Assembly. As a board member of the Civil Contract Party, she ran under the Way Out Alliance (Yelk) during the 2017 parliamentary election and was elected off the Yelk national list.

On April 11, 2018, she joined Ararat Mirzoyan in lighting smoke flares in the National Assembly to call attention to the protests against the transition of Serzh Sargsyan from President to Prime Minister. The protests did eventually result in Sargsyan's resignation.

== Professional career ==
Prior to running as a political candidate, Nazaryan worked as a journalist for Hetq and as the coordinator for election programs at the Armenian branch of Transparency International. In 2013, she received the Freedom of Speech Award from the Asparez Journalists' Club.
