= October 2018 protests in Armenia =

Protests in Armenia (2018)
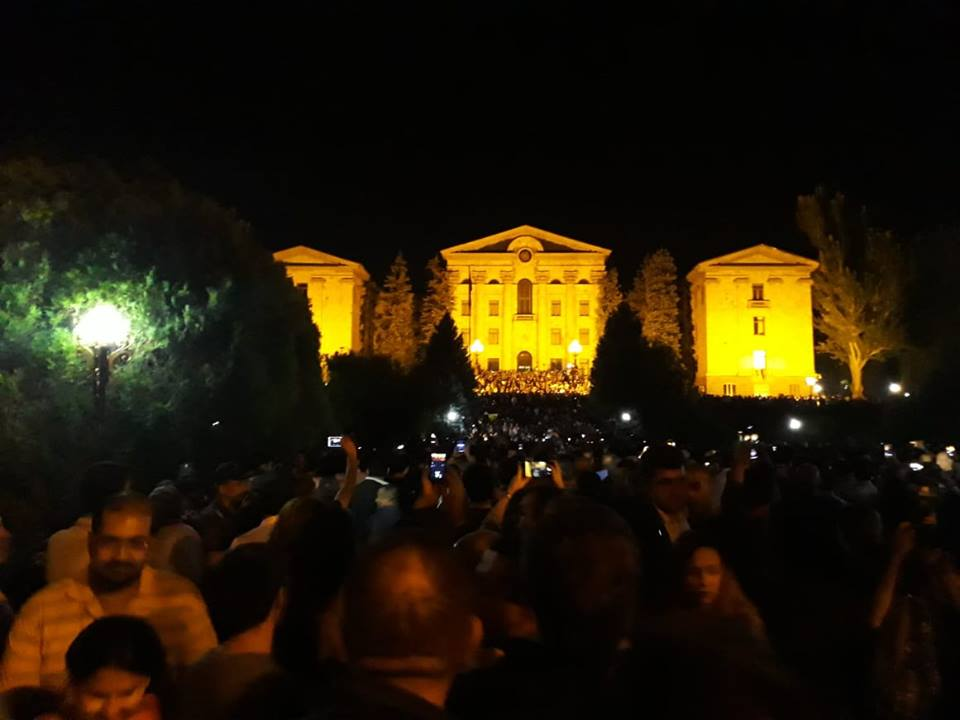
- Protesters on 2 October 2018
- Date: 1 October 2018 - 2 October 2018
- Location: Armenia: Yerevan, Gyumri, Vanadzor, Abovyan, Sevan, Gavar, Artashat, Armavir, Ashtarak, Vagharshapat, Kapan, Stepanavan, Spitak, Dilijan; Armenian diaspora: Los Angeles, Glendale, California, Moscow, Marseille, Toronto, Montreal, Sochi, Vancouver, Athens, London, Berlin, Buenos Aires, Chicago, São Paulo
- Methods: Demonstrations, sit-ins, student protest, civil disobedience, online activism, boycotts of business, general strike

Parties
Political opposition: Civil Contract; Mission Party; Extra-parliamentary parties: Free Democrats; Armenian National Congress; Government of Armenia: Police (incl. non-uniformed officers); National Security Service; Non-political groups: 12th Peacekeeping Brigade	Government of Armenia: Republican Party of Armenia; Initial Supporters: Prosperous Armenia (until 8 October); Armenian Revolutionary Federation (until 16 October)

Lead figures
Nikol Pashinyan	Serzh Sargsyan; Eduard Sharmazanov; Arpine Hovhannisyan

Number
Yerevan: 150,000 Gyumri: 10,000 Vanadzor: 5000	50

Casualties and losses
none	none

On 2 October 2018, protest demonstrations demanding the dissolution of the National Assembly of Armenia were held in the capital city of Yerevan and at other locations in Armenia. The protests were a response to a vote by the National Assembly to block Prime Minister Nikol Pashinyan from disbanding the legislature and holding an election. In the evening, the prime minister's supporters gathered at Marshal Baghramyan Avenue, Baghramyan and Karen Demirchyan streets and blockaded the National Assembly building. After endorsement by Pashinyan, protest rallies were also launched at Vanadzor and Gyumri.

== Background ==
A draft law, Amending the National Assembly Rules of Procedure, drawn up jointly by RPA faction members Arpine Hovhannisyan, Vahram Baghdasaryan and Andranik Harutyunyan, was submitted for consideration by the National Assembly on 2 October 2018. That evening, the National Assembly convened an extraordinary session and adopted the draft law, according to which a National Assembly session would be considered interrupted if external forces prevented the session from taking place.

== Rally on Baghramyan Street ==
At the rally to demand the dissolution of the assembly, Nikol Pashinyan signed a decree dismissing ministers representing the Prosperous Armenia and ARF-D parties from their posts. By mutual consent, Deputy Prime Minister Mher Grigoryan of the RPA decided to continue to remain in office. Nikol Pashinyan also announced that the leaders of the two parties would be dismissed from their posts at the next session of government. At the same time, ARF Dashnaktsutyun announced the withdrawal of its ministers from the government. Nikol Pashinyan stated that once the dismissal of PAP and ARF-D members had come into force, he would resign from his post.

== See also ==
- 2018 Armenian Velvet Revolution
