= State Protection Service (Armenia) =

Armenian government agency

State Protection Service of the Republic of Armenia
- Հայաստանի Հանրապետության պետական պահպանության ծառայություն

Agency overview
- Jurisdiction: Government of Armenia
- Headquarters: Yerevan, Armenia
- Agency executive: Artur Gasparyan, Head of the State Protection Service
- Parent department: Bodies under the Prime Minister of Armenia
- Website: https://sps.am/en

State Protection Service of the Republic of Armenia (Armenian: Հայաստանի Հանրապետության պետական պահպանության ծառայություն, Hayastani Hanrapetutyan Petakan Pahpanutyan Tsarayutyun) is a government agency responsible for protecting high-ranking officials and key government facilities in Armenia. Since 2023, the service operates as a body directly subordinate to the Prime Minister of Armenia, having previously been under the National Security Service (NSS).

== History ==
The State Protection Service was originally part of the NSS, Armenia's primary security and intelligence agency. In early 2023, as part of institutional reforms, the Service was transferred under the direct authority of the Prime Minister, reflecting a broader effort to modernize and increase the efficiency of Armenia's security services while reducing the centralized powers of the NSS. Sargis Hovhannisyan was reappointed as head of the SPS on 28 April 2023. Other reforms include the establishment of the Foreign Intelligence Service (FIS) in 2022, which aims to independently handle classified information and reduce potential security leaks.

The requirements for Chief of the State Protection Service were also be changed, enabling both civilians and military officials to be appointed to the position.

Secretary of the Security Council of Armenia Armen Grigoryan said that the government decided to separate the State Protection Service from the NSS because "at this moment there is a political decision that the National Security Service must have three main functions – counterintelligence, protection of constitutional order and anti-terrorism."

== Role and responsibilities ==
The State Protection Service's primary duties include:

- Protection of high-ranking government officials, including the Prime Minister and visiting foreign dignitaries.
- Security of key government facilities and strategic sites across Armenia.
- Supporting anti-terrorism measures in coordination with other law enforcement and security agencies.
- Enhancing the operational and analytical capabilities of the Armenian state's protective services.

The Service operates continuously, with its work often designed to be unobtrusive to both the protected individuals and the public.

== Leadership ==
- Artur Gasparyan (7 March 2024 – present)
- Sargis Hovhannisyan (24 December 2020 – 7 March 2024)
- Grigori Hayrapetov (2018-2019)
- Hrachya Harutyunyan (2010-2018)
- Hayk Harutyunyan (2008-2010)
- Grigori Sarkisyan (1998-2008)
- Romen Ghazaryan (1992-1998)

== See also ==
- National Security Service (Armenia)
- Foreign Intelligence Service
