= Human Rights Defender of Armenia =

Ombudsperson of Armenia

- Մարդու Իրավունքների Պաշտպան (Armenian)
- Human Rights Defender of Armenia emblem
- Incumbent; Anahit Manasyan since 12 April 2023
- Member of: ENNHRI; GANHRI (A status); IOI
- Seat: Yerevan
- Appointer: National Assembly
- Term length: Six years
- Formation: 19 February 2004
- First holder: Larisa Alaverdyan
- Website: www.ombuds.am/

The Human Rights Defender of Armenia (Armenian: Հայաստանի մարդու իրավունքների պաշտպան, romanized: Hayastani mardu iravunk’neri pashtpan) is the official ombudsman, who, acting pursuant to the Constitution of Armenia, as well as, principles and norms of international law, protects the human rights and fundamental freedoms of individuals. The office of the Human Rights Defender was established in 2003 and has since become a member of the European Ombudsman Institute. The headquarters of the Human Rights Defender of Armenia are located in Yerevan. Since 12 April 2023, Anahit Manasyan was elected as the Human Rights Defender of Armenia by the National Assembly.

== History ==
The office of the Human Rights Defender of Armenia was founded in the beginning of 2004 through legislation signed by the former president of Armenia, Robert Kocharyan. Armen Harutyunyan was the first one who was appointed through elections by the National Assembly. Amnesty International's 2024 report on Armenia notes that in June 2024, staff in the office of the Human Rights Defender reported being subjected to threats, harassment and verbal abuse, particularly for their work with LGBT+ individuals.

At Pink Armenia's 2025 IDAHOBIT event, the Human Rights Defender's office confirmed their commitment to monitor the situation of LGBT+ rights, respond to violations, and enhance institutional responses.

== Selection process ==
=== Qualifications ===
To be considered as a candidate for the position of Human Rights Defender of Armenia, one must meet the following criteria:

- Be an Armenian citizen;
- Have lived in Armenia for the past 5 years;
- Minimum age of 25;
- Possess sufficient knowledge and experience in the defense of human rights field.

=== Election ===
The National Assembly shall appoint the Defender by a vote of more than 3/5 of the general number of deputies from candidates nominated by the president of the Republic, 1/5 of the National Assembly deputies. He/she shall be appointed to office for a term of 6 years, with not more than two consecutive terms. Before executing the powers of the office, a defender is required to take the following oath:

Having accepted the commitments of human rights defender I hereby swear to be faithful to RA Constitution and laws, the principles of justice and civil society as to defend the human rights and fundamental freedoms of individuals. I swear to act in impartial, honest and diligent manner.

=== Termination ===
There are several acceptable grounds for termination, including:

1. The Defender's powers shall terminate 6 years after his/her oath.
2. In case of termination of the Defender's powers, the new Defender shall be appointed within a month from the date of termination of the powers of the previous Defender.
3. The Defender's powers shall be terminated prior to the end of the term if:
- A verdict of the Court convicting the Defender enters into legal force;
- The Defender loses citizenship of Armenia;
- The Defender repeats his/her letter of resignation to National Assembly of Armenia not more than 10 days after first letter of resignation.
- The Defender is declared disabled, partly disabled, missing or deceased by an effective decision of the Court;
- In case of Defender's death.

== Human Rights Defenders of Armenia ==
Armenia has had 6 human rights defenders:

- Larisa Alaverdyan (1 March 2004 - 20 February 2006)
- Armen Harutyunyan (20 February 2006 - 1 February 2011)
- Karen Andreasyan (3 March 2011 - February 2016)
- Arman Tatoyan (February 2016 - 24 January 2022)
- Kristinne Grigoryan (24 January 2022 - 12 April 2023)
- Anahit Manasyan (since 12 April 2023)

== Powers and duties ==
=== Legal Status and Independence ===
The Defender operates autonomously and is guided only by the Constitution and the laws of Armenia, as well as norms and principles of International Laws. The Defender is not subordinated to any central or local self-governing agency or official. The Defender is not required to give explanations, including as a witness, about the essence of complaint or documents in their possession or provide them for familiarization, except in cases prescribed by law and order. The decisions of the Defender are not administrative acts and cannot be appealed.

=== Parliamentary Role ===
The Defender has the right to be present at the sittings of the Government of Armenia and other state agencies, and make a speech if there are discussed issues regarding the human rights and the fundamental freedoms of people, as well as provide questions concerning the violation of the human rights or the fundamental freedoms by the agency where the sitting is taking place or the subordinate agencies or officials of that agency. The Defender or his/her representative has the right to be present at the sittings of the National Assembly of Armenia, make a speech ordered by the law of Armenia.

=== Investigative Powers ===
The officials of central and local self-governing agencies are obliged to provide every required material and document regarding their jurisdiction, as well as provide any information to the Defender necessary for the discussion of the complaint free of charge and without hindrance. Within his/her jurisdiction the Defender enjoys the right of urgent reception of central and local self-governing agencies, their officials, as well as the heads of organizations and other officials, and coercive detention facilities. While investigating the complaints the Defender is obliged to give an opportunity to those central or local self-governing agency or their official whose decision or acts (idleness) are being complained to make clarifications about the complaint and the results of investigation, as well as fully substantiate their position. After the discussion in 10 days the results about the complaint are being given to those central or local self-governing agencies or their official whose decision or acts (idleness) are being complained. The mentioned is obliged to send his position and clarifications to the Defender no later than 15 days after receiving the results of investigation. This deadline can be extended by the Defender.

=== Annual report ===
Every year, amid the first quarter of the year, the Defender should convey a report on their exercises and on the human rights circumstance in the earlier year to the president of Armenia and the agents of official, administrative, and legal powers. The reports should be exhibited to the National Assembly amid the first sitting of the National Assembly's spring session. The Defender likewise displays their answer to broad communications and important non-governmental organizations.

Since 2023, the annual report has included a focus on LGBT+ rights.

=== Restrictions and limitations ===
The Human Rights Defender shall not:

1. Hold any state or other office or perform other work for compensation, except for scientific, pedagogical or creative activities.
2. Be a member of any political party
3. Nominate his/her candidacy for elections
4. Participate in pre-election campaigns

Within 14 days after assuming Office, the Defender shall discontinue any activity that is inconsistent with these requirements. The defender can not:

1. Intervene into judicial processes (They may ask for information on any case that is on the stage of trial and direct recommendations/comments to the court, as to guarantee the rights of citizens to fair functioning of the court system)
2. Publish any personal data about the complainant or any other person that were disclosed during examination of the complaint without their written consent.
3. In addition, the Defender's decision cannot hinder the person from protecting his/her rights, freedoms and legal interests by other means not prohibited by law.

=== Defender's immunity ===
After assuming his/her responsibilities the defender cannot be prosecuted or hold liability because of the actions s/he did on his post, including the opinions expressed in National Assembly (if they are not offensive or defamatory). No criminal prosecution shall be brought against him/her; s/he cannot be detained or arrested without the consent of the National Assembly. In case the Defender is caught in the act of crime, the official person executing the arrest shall immediately inform the president of the National Assembly about the fact.

== International cooperation ==
The Human Rights Defender of Armenia maintains membership in the International Ombudsman Institute, the European Ombudsman Institute, the International Coordinating Committee for National Human Rights Institutions, the European Network of Ombudspersons for Children, the European Network of National Human Rights Institutions, the Association of Ombudsmen and Mediators of La Francophonie, the Association of Mediterranean Ombudsman, the Asian Ombudsman Association, and the Global Alliance of National Human Rights Institutions.

== See also ==
- Armenia in the Council of Europe
- Corruption in Armenia
- Government of Armenia
- Human rights in Armenia
- List of human rights organizations in Armenia
- Ombudsman services by country
- Social issues in Armenia
- Social protection in Armenia
