= Manasyan =

Manasyan (Armenian: Մանասյան) is an Armenian surname. Notable people with the surname include:

- Anahit Manasyan (born 1988), Armenian constitutionalist
- Sargis Manasyan, Armenian politician
- Vazgen Manasyan (born 1958), Tajikistani football coach
