= Hranush Kharatyan =

Armenian ethnographer (born 1952)

- Հրանուշ Խառատյան
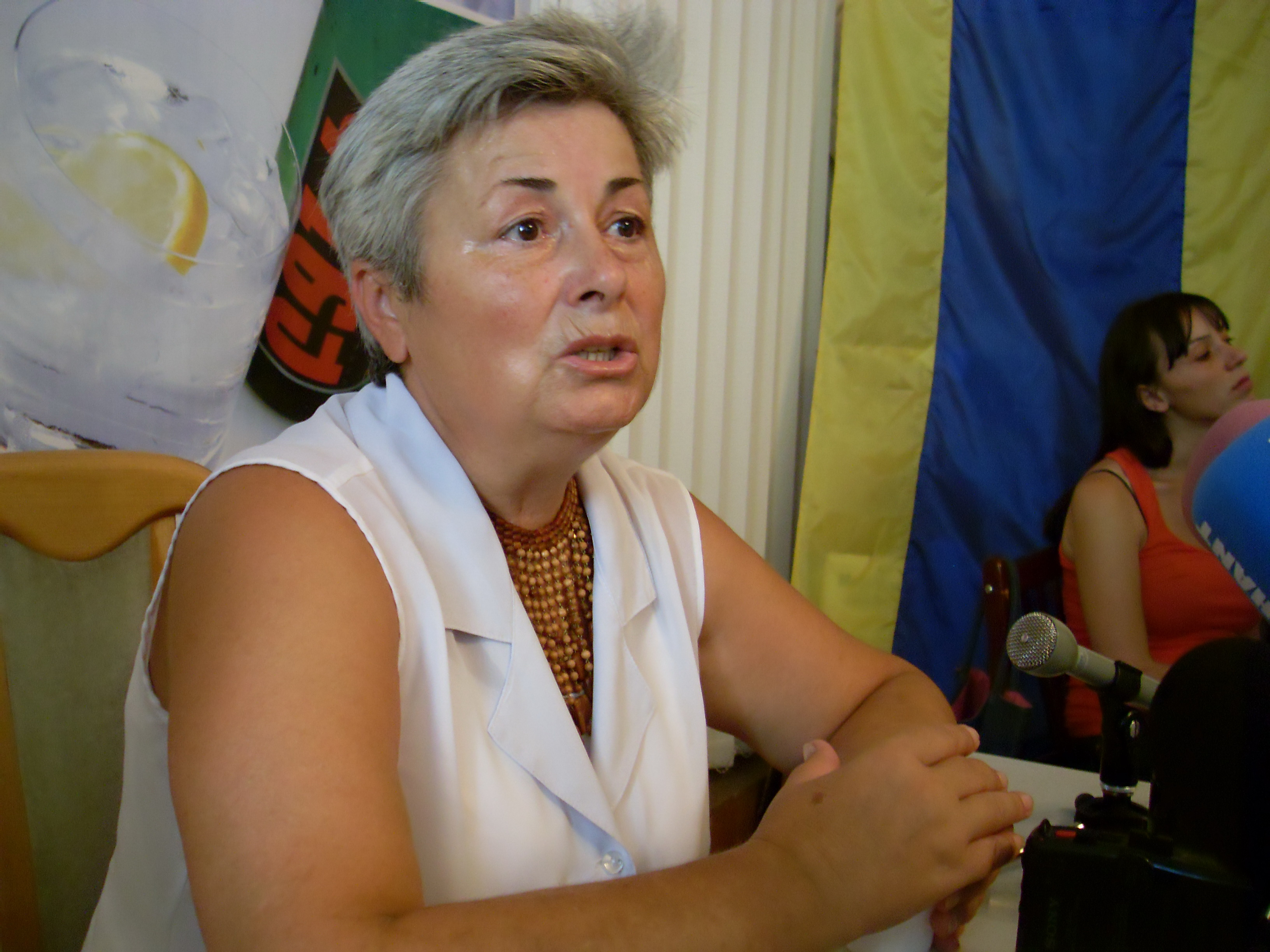
- Kharatyan in 2008

Deputy Mayor of Yerevan
- In office 1992–1993

Personal details
- Born: 18 February 1952 (age 74) Dağ Cəyir, Shamkir District, Azerbaijan Soviet Socialist Republic
- Children: 2
- Education: Yerevan State University
- Profession: Ethnographer

Hranush Kharatyan (Armenian: Հրանուշ Խառատյան; born 18 February 1952) is an Armenian ethnographer. She also specialises in Caucasus studies, minority groups and Armenian studies. She has been a member of the Pre-Parliament civil initiative since November 2012.

Born in the village of Dağ Cəyir, in Azerbaijan's Shamkir District, Kharatyan graduated from the Yerevan State University (YSU) with a history degree in 1975. She earned the degree of a Candidate of Sciences from the Institute of Anthropology and Ethnography in Moscow by 1979.

From 1979–1989, Kharatyan worked as a researcher at the Oriental studies Institute of the Armenian National Academy of Sciences. In 1989–1992 she was a research fellow at the Department of Ethnography at the YSU. She headed the same department between 1994 and 2000. In 1992–1993 she was the Deputy Mayor of Yerevan, Armenia's capital. She was appointed head of the Department of National Minorities and Religious Affairs in the Armenian Government in 2004, which she resigned in 2008.

Kharatyan is fluent in Armenian, Russian and has some knowledge of Azerbaijani. She is married with 2 children.
