= Armen Harutyunyan =

- Արմեն Հարությունյան
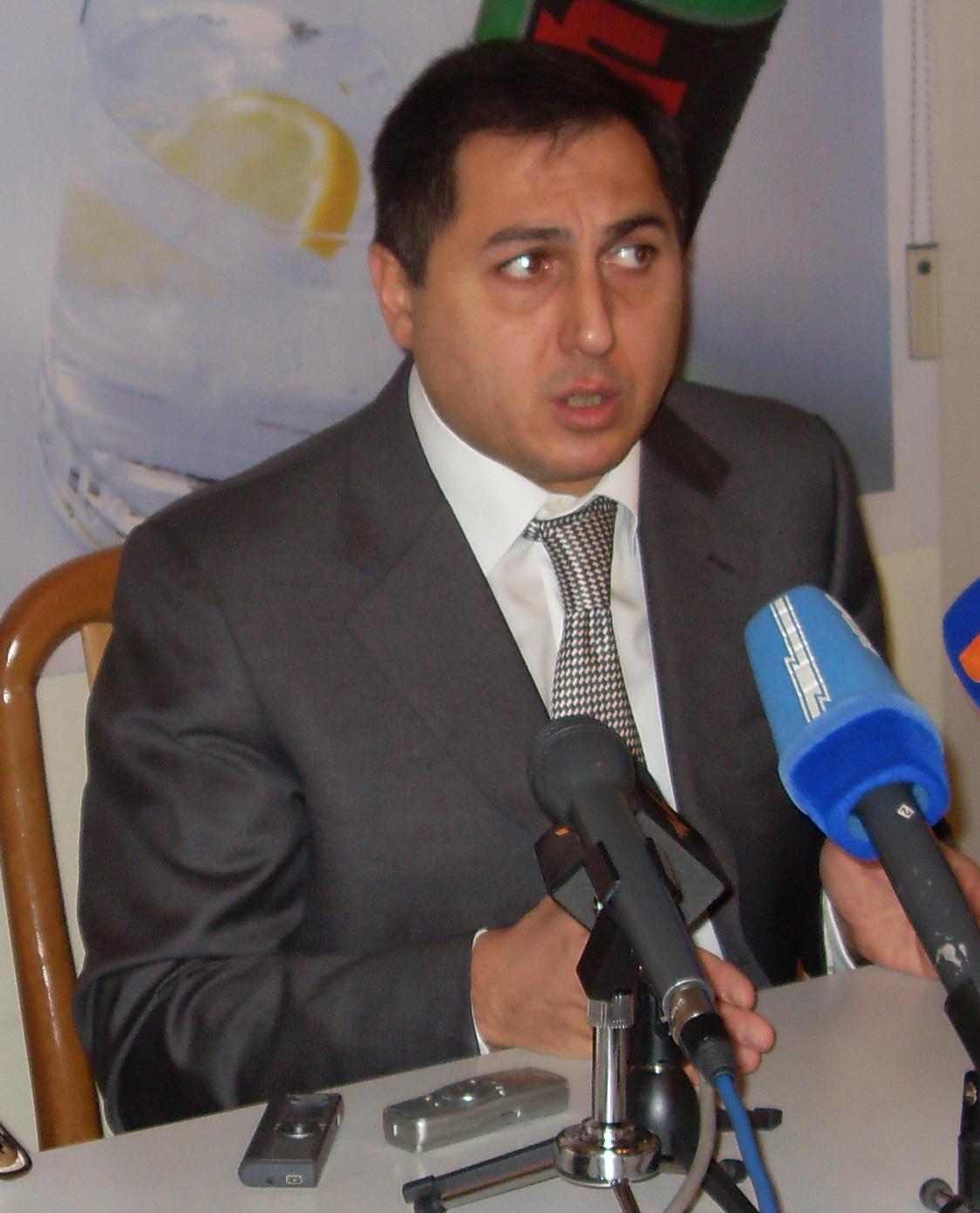
- Harutyunyan in 2008

Judge at the European Court of Human Rights
- Incumbent
- Assumed office 17 September 2015

Regional Representative of UN High Commissioner for Human Rights in Central Asia
- In office 2011–2015

Personal details
- Born: 1964 (age 61–62) Yerevan, Armenia
- Education: Yerevan State University
- Profession: Lawyer

Armen Shurayi Harutyunyan (Armenian: Արմեն Շուրայի Հարությունյան; born 8 March 1964) is the former ombudsman of Armenia and Regional Representative of the UN High Commissioner for Human Rights in Central Asia. He took office in February 2011. In 2015, he was elected Judge at the European Court of Human Rights and is a judge since 17 December 2015. Armen Harutyunyan is the author of more than 70 scientific works. He is married and has two children.

== Biography ==
Harutyunyan was born in 1964 in Yerevan. He holds law degrees from Yerevan State University, the Institute of State and Law of the Academy of USSR and the Academy of Public Administration of the Russian Federation. Between 1989-2002 he lectured in law at Yerevan State University; from 1993 to 1997 studied Doctoral Studies at the Academy of Public Administration, adjunct to the President of Russian Federation and obtained the degree of Doctor of Law (equivalent to Senior Juris Doctor). Starting in 1997, he continued his education at various European universities including the Central European University, Paris 12 University, University of Nottingham (School of Law, Human Rights Law Center), as well as at the European Court of Human Rights with main focuses on Constitutional Law, European Law and Human Rights.

From 1989 till now Armen Harutyunyan has been lecturing at the Law Department of Yerevan State University. From 1997-2005 he was working as a legal advisor at the Constitutional Court of Armenia. Also from 1997 he was a legal advisor at the Constitutional Court, and in the constitutional reform of 2005 he was a representative of former President Robert Kocharyan. Between 2002-06 he was a rector of the Public Administration Academy.

In 2000 he became a member of the Commission established to assess the compatibility of the Armenian legislation with the requirements of the European Convention on Human Rights (ECHR) during the process of Armenia's joining the Council of Europe.

From 2002 to present, Armen Harutyunyan was the Deputy Representative of Armenia in the European Commission for Democracy through Law (Venice Commission Member States of the Venice Commission) Representative from Armenia is Gagik Harutyunyan. He is a member of the Europe in Law Association.

== Ombudsman ==
On 17 February 2006, Harutyunyan was elected for a six-year term as the Human Rights Defender (ombudsman) of Armenia, with more than 3/5 of the votes of deputies in the National Assembly. He was the first elected holder of the post in accordance with 83.1 article of Constitution, succeeding Larisa Alaverdyan who had been appointed to the office by presidential decree in 2004.

In an extensive report in April 2008, Harutyunyan cast doubt on the credibility of the official (government) theory on the use of lethal force against thousands of supporters of opposition leader Levon Ter-Petrosian who barricaded themselves outside the Yerevan mayor's office hours after the break-up of their 10-day sit-in in the city's Liberty Square on 1 March.

On 7 July 2008, Harutyunyan asked the National Security Service (NSS) to assign armed bodyguards to him and members of his family. He was succeeded as ombudsman by Karen Andreasyan, who was elected by the National Assembly in March 2011.

In 2008, Armen Harutyunyan joined the Association of French-Speaking Ombudsmen and Mediators. In 2009, he became a Board Member of the European Ombudsman Institute.

== See also ==
- Armenia in the Council of Europe
