= Security Council of Armenia =

- Անվտանգության խորհուրդ
- Security Council of Armenia logo

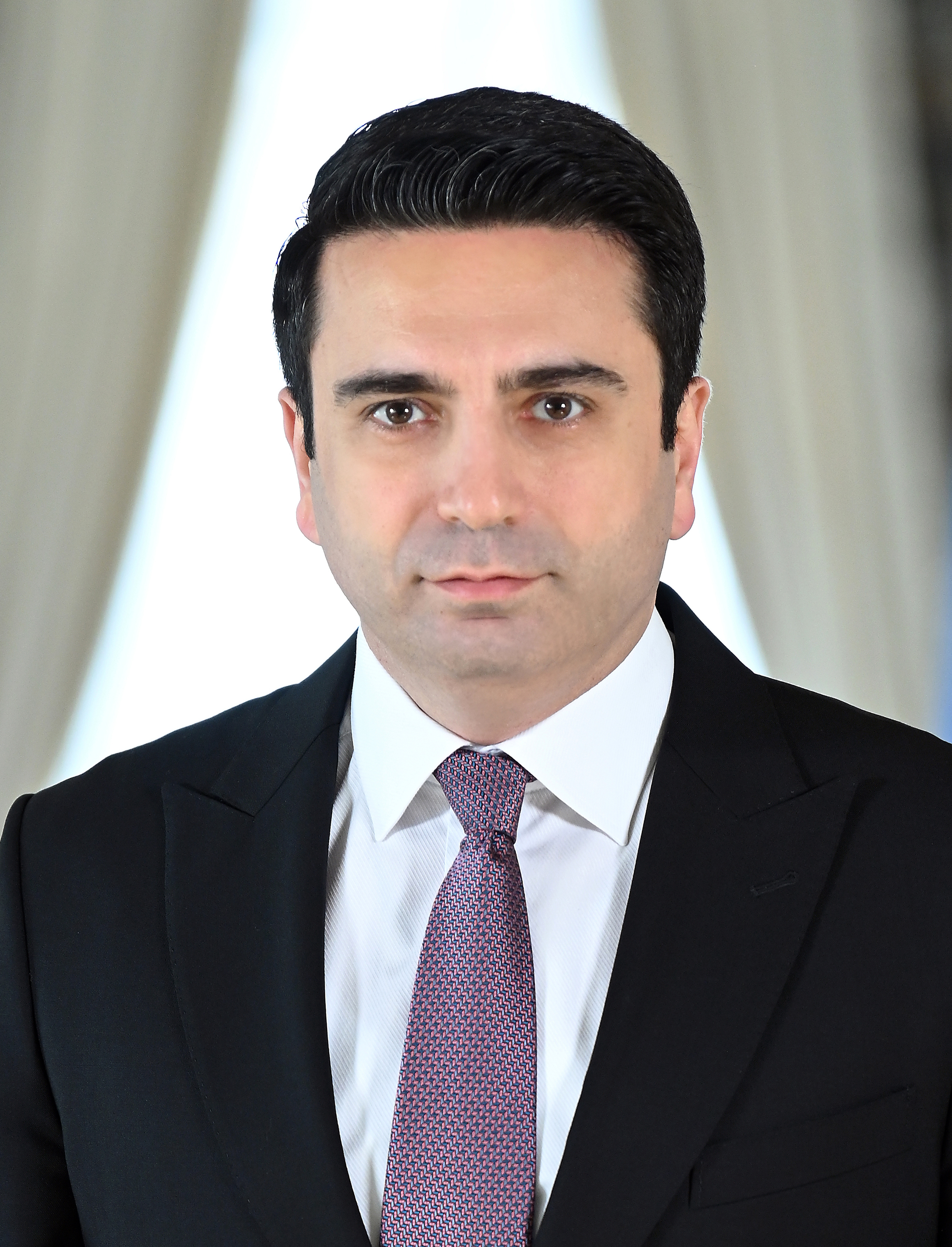
- Alen Simonyan, the current Secretary of the Council.

Agency overview
- Formed: 22 November 1991
- Jurisdiction: Government of Armenia
- Headquarters: 24 Marshal Baghramyan Avenue, Yerevan, Armenia
- Agency executive: Alen Simonyan, Secretary
- Website: www.seco.am

The Security Council of Armenia (Armenian: Անվտանգության խորհուրդ, romanized: Anvtangut’yan khorhurd) is the highest decision-making defence and law enforcement body in the Republic of Armenia. The office of the Security Council is located on 24 Marshal Baghramyan Avenue in Yerevan.

== History ==
On 22 November 1991, President Levon Ter-Petrosyan appointed Ashot Manucharyan as Senior Advisor to the President on national security. On 13 December 1991, the National Security Council (NSC) attached to the Presidency was founded by decree. Following the 2005 constitutional amendments, article 55 of the Constitution of Armenia foresaw the formation of the Armenian NSC attached to the Presidency and having a consultative status. On 29 February 2008, Artur Baghdasaryan announced that he had accepted the post of Secretary of the Security Council as part of a planned coalition government with then President-elect Serzh Sargsyan. The post of Secretary of the Security Council was previously considered to be primarily ceremonial, with the council seldom meeting. With the election of Prime Minister Sargsyan to the presidency, with Sargsyan himself having formerly headed the council, the council became more active, giving newly appointed Secretary Baghdasaryan the opportunity "to get fully involved in the governance of our country." On 7 March 2018, the National Assembly adopted the law "About the Formation of the SC and Its Activity".

== Functions ==
The Security Council defines main defense policy directions, as well as approves development plans for the Armed Forces of Armenia and other militarized forces. It also, at the suggestion of the Prime Minister of Armenia, discusses matters relating to the security and territorial integrity of Armenia.

The Office of the Security Council ensures:

- The organization of preparatory works for Security Council sessions
- Working out of proposals on Security Council sessions
- Collection of information on security threats to the Republic
- Monitoring and preparation of reports
- Supervision over the execution of assignments

== Security Council Office ==
Position	Name
Head of the Security Council Office	Anahit Shirinyan
Adviser to the Secretary of the Security Council	Anahit Poghosyan
Adviser to the Secretary of the Security Council	Loosineh Senagani Markarian
Deputy Head of the Security Council Office	Tatev Antonyan
Adviser to the Secretary of the Security Council	Mikayel Avetisyan
Adviser to the Secretary of the Security Council	Tatevik Petrosyan
Adviser to the Secretary of the Security Council	Konstantin Ghazaryan
Public Relations Office	
Head of the Department of Security Policy and Fundamental Documents	Tigran Sargsyan
Head of the Department of Military Security	Diana Zargarian
Head of the Department of Political, Social and Economic Security	Harutyun Gevorgyan

== Members ==
Members of the Security Council include:

- Prime Minister/Chairman of the Security Council – Nikol Pashinyan
- Deputy Prime Minister – Tigran Khachatryan
- Deputy Prime Minister – Mher Grigoryan
- Secretary – Alen Simonyan
- Minister of Defence – Suren Papikyan
- Minister of Foreign Affairs – Ararat Mirzoyan
- Directory of the National Security Service – Andranik Simonyan
- Chief of the Police of Armenia – Aram Ghazaryan
- Chief of the General Staff – Edvard Asryan
- Director of the Foreign Intelligence Service - Kristinne Grigoryan

== Secretaries of the Council ==
- Ashot Manucharyan (1991–1994)
- Gerard Libaridian (1994–1997)
- Alexan Harutyunyan (1998–1999)
- Serzh Sargsyan (1999 – 4 April 2007)
- Armen Gevorgyan (6 June 2007 – February 2008)
- Artur Baghdasaryan (25 March 2008 – 30 April 2014)
- Armen Gevorgyan (6 June 2016 – 3 October 2016)
- Yuri Khatchaturov (3 October 2016 – 2 May 2017)
- Armen Grigoryan (17 May 2018 – 13 August 2026)
- Alen Simonyan (13 August 2026–present)

== International cooperation ==
On 23 February 2012, representatives of Frontex met with the Security Council of Armenia. Areas of mutual cooperation, developing Armenia–EU relations, and promoting peace and security in the South Caucasus region was discussed. A working arrangement between Armenia and Frontex was signed.

On 15 April 2013, Artur Baghdasaryan, former Secretary of the Security Council of Armenia held a meeting with the EU Advisory Group to the Republic of Armenia (EUAG) and with Traian Hristea, former Head of the EU Delegation to Armenia. EUAG expressed satisfaction with the alignment of Armenian policies to EU standards.

On 4 May 2022, Secretary Armen Grigoryan met with the Prime Minister of Georgia Irakli Garibashvili. The sides discussed Armenia–Georgia relations and maintaining regional stability and security in the South Caucasus.

On 15 July 2022, Secretary Armen Grigoryan held a meeting with the Director of the Central Intelligence Agency, Willian Burns. The parties discussed the advancement of Armenia–United States relations.

On 29 September 2022, Secretary Armen Grigoryan met with the United States Assistant Secretary of Defense, Laura Cooper, at the United States Department of Defense. The sides discussed prospects for the development of bilateral relations.

On 4 October 2022, Secretary Armen Grigoryan met with the special representative of the NATO Secretary General in the Caucasus and Central Asia, Javier Colomina in Brussels.

== Recent developments ==
On 14 October 2022, Secretary Armen Grigoryan endorsed the European Union Mission in Armenia as a way for the European Union to become a security guarantor in the region and confirmed Armenia's commitment to support the mission.

== See also ==
- Government of Armenia
- Law of Armenia
- Politics of Armenia
