= Border Troops of Armenia =

- Հայաստանի Սահմանային պահպանություն
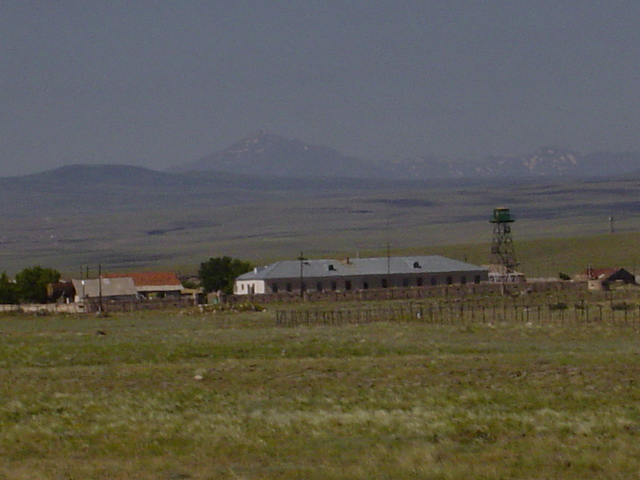
- An Armenian border guard station in Shirak province, facing the closed border with Turkey
- Founded: 26 April 1994
- Country: Armenia
- Type: Border Guard
- Role: National border patrol, security, integrity
- Part of: National Security Service of Armenia
- Headquarters: Yerevan
- Nickname: Frontier Guard
- Anniversaries: Border Guards Day – 26 April
- Infantry fighting vehicles: BMD-1; BMP-1
- Website: https://sahmanapah.sns.am/hy/

Commanders
- Commander: Colonel Garik Muradyan
- Chief of Staff of the Border Guard: Colonel Arman Gasparyan

Insignia
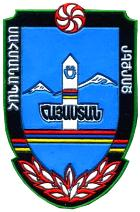
- Identification symbol

The Border Troops of the National Security Service of Armenia (Armenian: Հայաստանի Ազգային անվտանգության ծառայության սահմանապահ զորքեր), also known simply as the Border Guard of Armenia (Armenian: Հայաստանի Սահմանային պահպանություն) is the branch of the National Security Service of Armenia that is responsible for monitoring and guarding Armenia's borders with neighbors Turkey, Azerbaijan, Iran and Georgia. The border guard works in conjunction with a Russian military contingent from the Federal Security Service stationed in Armenia and headquartered at the 102nd Military Base in Gyumri.

== History ==
The border guard was initially subordinated to the Ministry of Defence when it was established on 28 January 1992 with the rest of the military. On September 11, 1993, the department was placed under the jurisdiction of the State Department of National Security. Initially, the Border Troops included two border detachments and a Special Regiment. The 1st border detachment was located in the city of Sisian, and the 2nd border detachment in the cities of Sevan and then Ijevan. On 26 April 1994, the draft Law "On the State Border" was introduced by the National Assembly of Armenia. Its charter was signed into law on 20 November 2001. In 2004 it was transferred to the jurisdiction of the Ministry of National Security and Internal Affairs. The first general meeting of the Union of Veterans and Pensioners of the Border Guard Troops took place in late 2019.

== Units ==
Name	Date of establishment	Garrison	Area of responsibility
Military Unit 5060	28 January 1992	Pushkino, Lori Province	Armenia–Georgia border
Military Unit 5070	16 December 1993	Kapan, Syunik Province	Armenia–Iran border Armenia–Azerbaijan border
Military Unit 5080	24 January 2006	Zvartnots International Airport; Gyumri Shirak International Airport; Erebuni Airport; Bagratashen Checkpoints; Gogavan Checkpoints; Bavra Checkpoints; Agarak Checkpoints; Privolnoye Checkpoints; Margara Checkpoints; Ayrum Railway Station	Ports of entry
Military Unit 5075	21 August 2021	Syunik Province	Armenia–Azerbaijan border
Military Unit 5065	2 September 2024	Tavush Province	Armenia–Azerbaijan border

== Mechanized equipment ==
As of 2022, the Ministry of National Security and Internal Affairs has its disposal 15 BMD-1s, 35 BMP-1s, 10 BRM-1Ks, 12 BTR-60s, 20 BTR-70s and UAV.

== Leadership ==
=== Commanders ===
- Major General Grigory Grigoryan
- Colonel General Yuri Khatchaturov (1992-2000)
- Major General Levon Stepanyan
- Colonel Vyacheslav Voskanyan
- Major General Armen Abrahamyan (November 2005 - 12 June 2018)
- Colonel General Vaghinak Sargsyan (12 June 2018 – 26 October 2020)
- Colonel Arman Maralchyan (26 October 2020 - November 10, 2025)
- Colonel Garik Muradyan (since November 10, 2025)

=== Chief of Staff of the Border Guard ===
- Gagik Tevosyan (?-26 October 2020)
- Colonel Arman Gasparyan (October 26, 2020 – July 30, 2024)
- Colonel Edgar Hunanyan (July 30, 2024 - Present)
- Colonel Roman Khachik Sahakyan

== See also ==
- Armed Forces of Armenia
- Armenian Air Force
