= Prime Minister's Office (Armenia) =

Armenian government agency

- Հայաստանի Հանրապետության վարչապետի գրասենյակ (Armenian)
- Coat of arms of Armenia

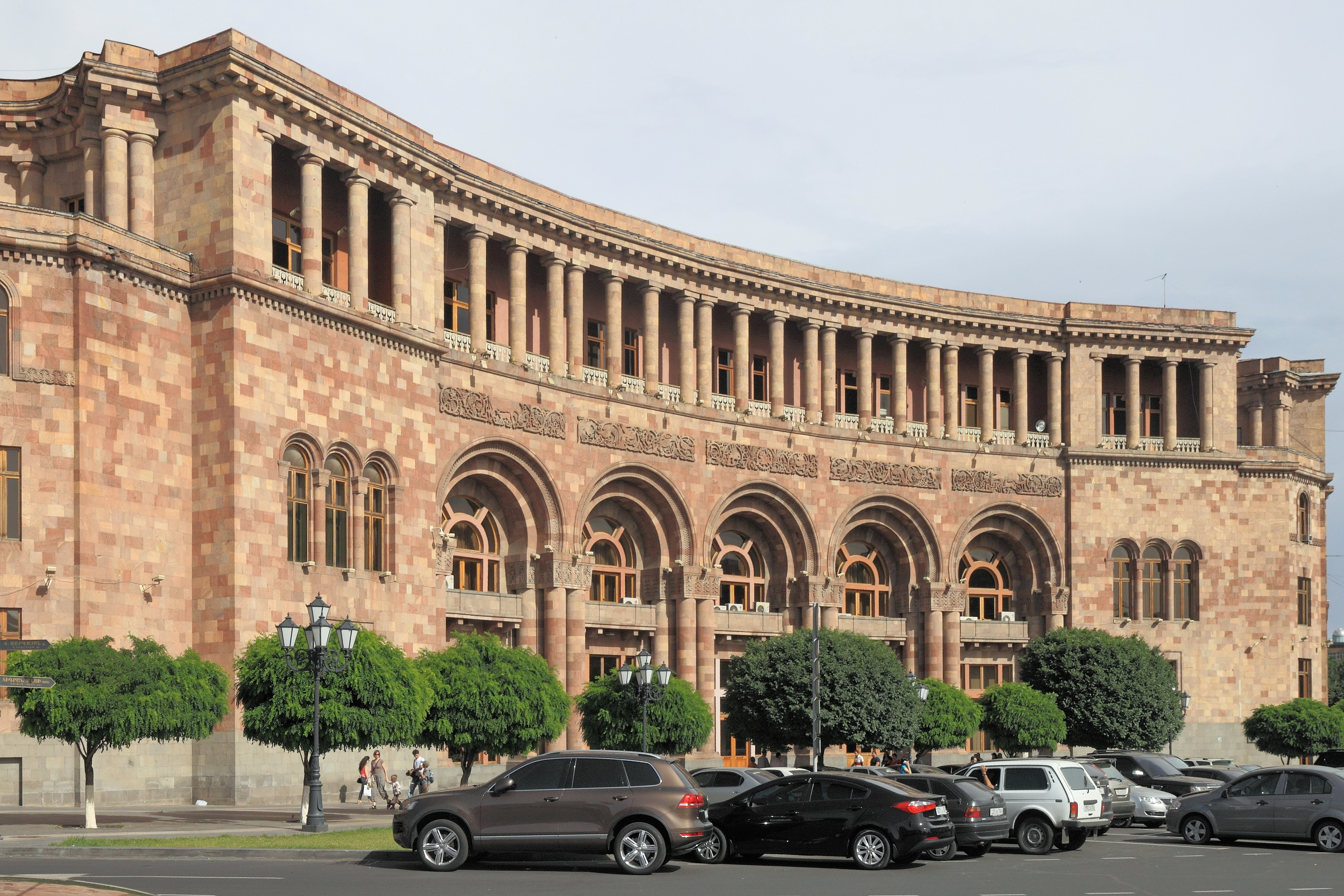
- Government House, Yerevan

Agency overview
- Formed: 2018
- Preceding agency: Office of the Prime Minister
- Jurisdiction: Government of Armenia
- Headquarters: Government House, Yerevan, Armenia
- Minister responsible: Nikol Pashinyan, Prime Minister
- Agency executive: Lilit Makunts, Chief of Staff to the Prime Minister
- Website: Official website

The Prime Minister's Office, also known as the Office of the Prime Minister of Armenia (Armenian: Հայաստանի Հանրապետության վարչապետի գրասենյակ, romanized: Hayastani Hanrapetut’yan varch’apeti grasenyak) is a state body within the Government of Armenia, which coordinates the activities of state bodies under the Prime Minister of Armenia, control functions and other functions stipulated by law and the relevant regulation, as well as an authorized state body to protect state secrets and ensure information security.

== History ==
During the Soviet period, administrative functions were performed by the Department of Affairs of the Council of Ministers of the Armenian SSR. On August 23, 1990, the Council of Ministers of Armenia was established, transforming it into the Government. As a result, the administrative service was renamed to the government staff. From 1996–1998, the term Secretariat was implemented within the staff structure. Following the 2015 Armenian constitutional referendum, amendments to the constitution put the country on a course from having a semi-presidential system to being a parliamentary republic. As a result, in 2018, the Government Office was abolished and transformed into the Office of the Prime Minister.

== Leading officials ==
Principal executive	Incumbent
Chief of Staff	Arayik Harutyunyan
Deputy Chiefs of Staff	Armenak Khachatryan
Deputy Chiefs of Staff	Artur Hovsepyan
Deputy Chiefs of Staff	Sargis Torosyan
Deputy Chiefs of Staff	Taron Chakhoyan
Deputy Chiefs of Staff	Zaruhi Matevosyan
Senior Adviser to the Prime Minister	Hambardzum Matevosyan
Advisers to Prime Minister	Artashes Toumanian
Voluntary Advisor	Aleksandr Avetisyan
Voluntary Advisor	Suren Maghakyan
Press Secretary	Nazeli Baghdasaryan
Chief Protocol Officer	Suren Varosyan
Assistants to the Prime Minister	Arsen Mikhaylov
Assistants to the Prime Minister	Artur Grigoryan
Assistants to the Prime Minister	David Gevorgyan
Assistants to the Prime Minister	Gagik Isakhanyan
Assistants to the Prime Minister	Hakob Abrahamyan
Assistants to the Prime Minister	Karine Davoyan

=== List of Chiefs of Staff (Note: Prior to the 2018 transition in system of government brought about by the 2015 Armenian constitutional referendum, the administrative head of the office was designated as the Minister and Chief of Staff of the Government.) ===
- Hrach Hakobyan (1990 — 1992)
- Hayk Kotanyan (1992 — 1993)
- Armen Khachatryan (1993 — 1994)
- Sergey Manassarian (1994 — 1996)
- Gagik Shahbazyan (1996 — 1997)
- Shahen Karamanukyan (1997 — 2000)
- Andranik Manukyan (2000)
- Manuk Topuzyan (2000 — 2008)
- David Sargsyan (2008 — 2012)
- Vache Gabrielyan (2012 — April 18, 2014)
- David Harutyunyan (2014 — 2017)
- Eduard Aghajanyan (May 10, 2018 — 18 January 2021)
- Arsen Torosyan (18 January 2021 — 1 July 2021)
- Arayik Harutyunyan (1 July 2021 — 3 August 2026)
- Lilit Makunts (since 3 August 2026)

=== List of Press Secretaries ===
- Hovhannes Nikoghosyan (19 April 2018 - 8 May 2018)
- Arman Eghoyan (2 June 2018 – 9 December 2018)
- Vladimir Karapetyan (29 January 2019 – 1 January 2020)
- Mane Gevorgyan (March 2020 – November 2021)
- Nazeli Baghdasaryan (November 2022 – July 2026)
- Melanya Harutyunyan (since 3 August 2026)

== Departments ==
- Staff of Prime Minister of Armenia
- Staff of Deputy Prime Minister of Armenia
- Relations with the National Assembly of Armenia
- External Relations Department
- Legal Department
- Programmes Expertise Department
- Personnel and Human Resources Management Department
- State and Legal Affairs Department
- Social Affairs Department
- Territorial Development and Environmental Issues Department
- Information and Public Relations Department
- Financial and Accounting Department
- Financial-Economical Department
- Regulatory Impact Assessment Department
- Department of Applications, Monitoring and Evaluation of Citizen Feedback
- Administrative Service Department
- Protocol Division
- Protocol Department
- First Division
- Mobilization Preparations and Mobilization Programmes Division
- General Division
- Division of Pardons, Citizenship, Awards and Titles
- Security Council Bureau
- Civil Service Bureau
- Inspection Bodies’ Coordination Bureau
- Public Council Secretariat
- Office of the Representative on International Legal Matters
