= Gerard Libaridian =

Armenian-American historian and politician

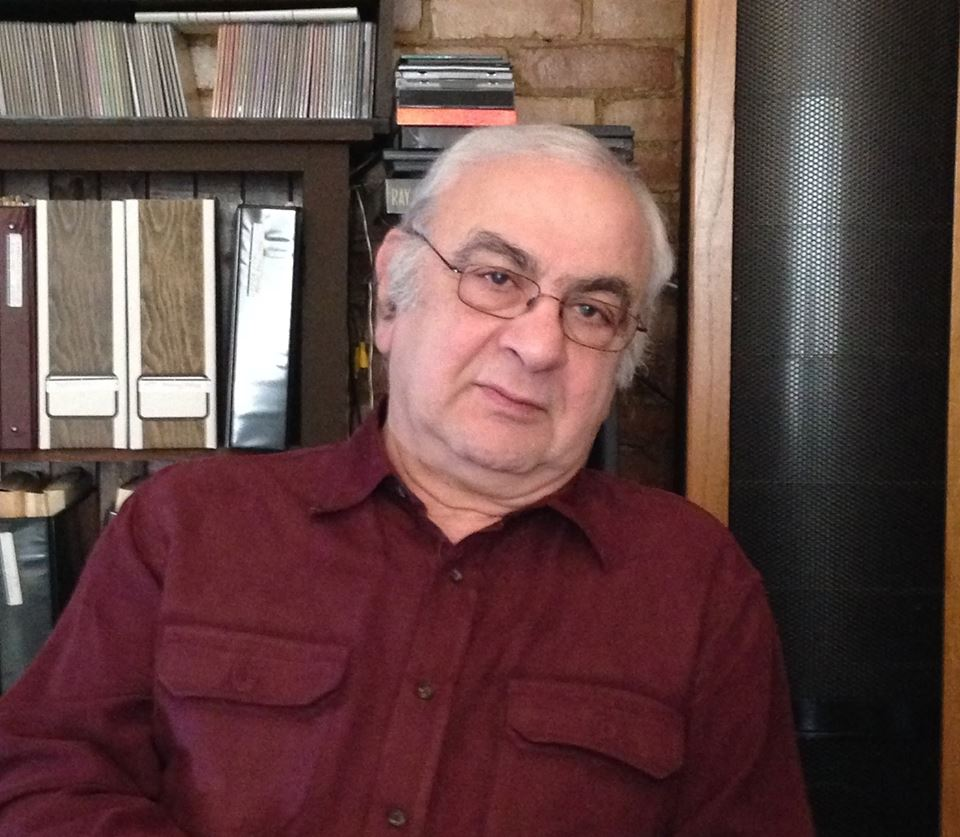

Deputy Minister of Foreign Affairs
- In office 1993–1994
- President: Levon Ter-Petrosyan

Secretary of the Security Council of Armenia
- In office 1994–1997
- President: Levon Ter-Petrosyan
- Preceded by: Ashot Manucharyan
- Succeeded by: Alexan Harutyunyan

Personal details
- Born: 10 July 1945 (age 81) Beirut, Lebanon
- Occupation: Historian, Politician
- Website: https://libaridian.com/

Gerard Jirair Libaridian (Armenian: Ժիրայր Լիպարիտեան, born 10 July 1945 in Beirut, Lebanon) is an Armenian American historian and politician.

== Early life ==
Born in Beirut, he moved to the United States in 1964. He received his education at the University of California, Los Angeles. From 1969 to 1971 , he edited the bi-weekly "Asbarez" (Los Angeles). From 1973 to 1974, he taught at the Department of History at UCLA, and then at other American universities. From 1982 to 1988 he was the co-founder and director of the Central Archive of the Armenian Democratic Party in Boston, and from 1982 - 1990 also the Zoryan Institute. He was also the editor of the quarterly "Armenian Review".

== Armenian government ==
From 1991 to 1997, he served as adviser, and then senior adviser to the former President of Armenia, Levon Ter-Petrosyan, and was closely involved in the Karabakh negotiations. In 2007, Libaridian was appointed the Director of Armenian Studies Program at the University of Michigan. He holds the Alex Manoogian Chair in Modern Armenian History at the University of Michigan. He has provided occasional commentary on relations between Armenia, Azerbaijan and Turkey, including on the 2020 Nagorno-Karabakh war. In 2012, he had warned that Armenia would "remain weak" if it did not settle the Karabakh conflict.

In 1995 the Commission on Security and Cooperation in Europe wrote that Libaridian had been a member of the Armenian Revolutionary Federation (ARF) for 25 years and was "intimately acquainted with its structure and methods."

== Selected works ==
- 1984 (as editor): What Is to Be Asked?, ed., Proceedings of Colloquium, Zoryan Institute, Cambridge, Mass.
- 1985 (as editor): A Crime of Silence. The Armenian Genocide. Zed Books, ISBN 978-0862324247
- 1988 (as editor) The Karabagh File. Documents and Facts, 1918-1988 (ed.). Zoryan Institute, Cambridge and Toronto
- 1990 (as editor) The Sumgait Tragedy: Pogroms Against Armenians in Soviet Azerbaijan, Caratzas and Zoryan Institute
- 1991: (as editor) Armenia at the Crossroads: Democracy and Nationhood in the Post-Soviet Era: Essays, interviews, and speeches by the leaders of the national democratic movement in Armenia. Blue Crane Books (Watertown, Massachusetts), ISBN 978-0-9628715-1-1
- 1999: The Challenge of Statehood. Armenian Political Thinking since Independence
- 2006 (as editor) Demokratizatsiya (Washington, DC)
- 2007: Modern Armenia: People, Nation, State. Transaction Publishers (New Brunswick, New Jersey), ISBN 978-1-4128-0648-0
