= Kristinne Grigoryan =

Armenian lawyer and former minister

- Քրիստինե Գրիգորյան
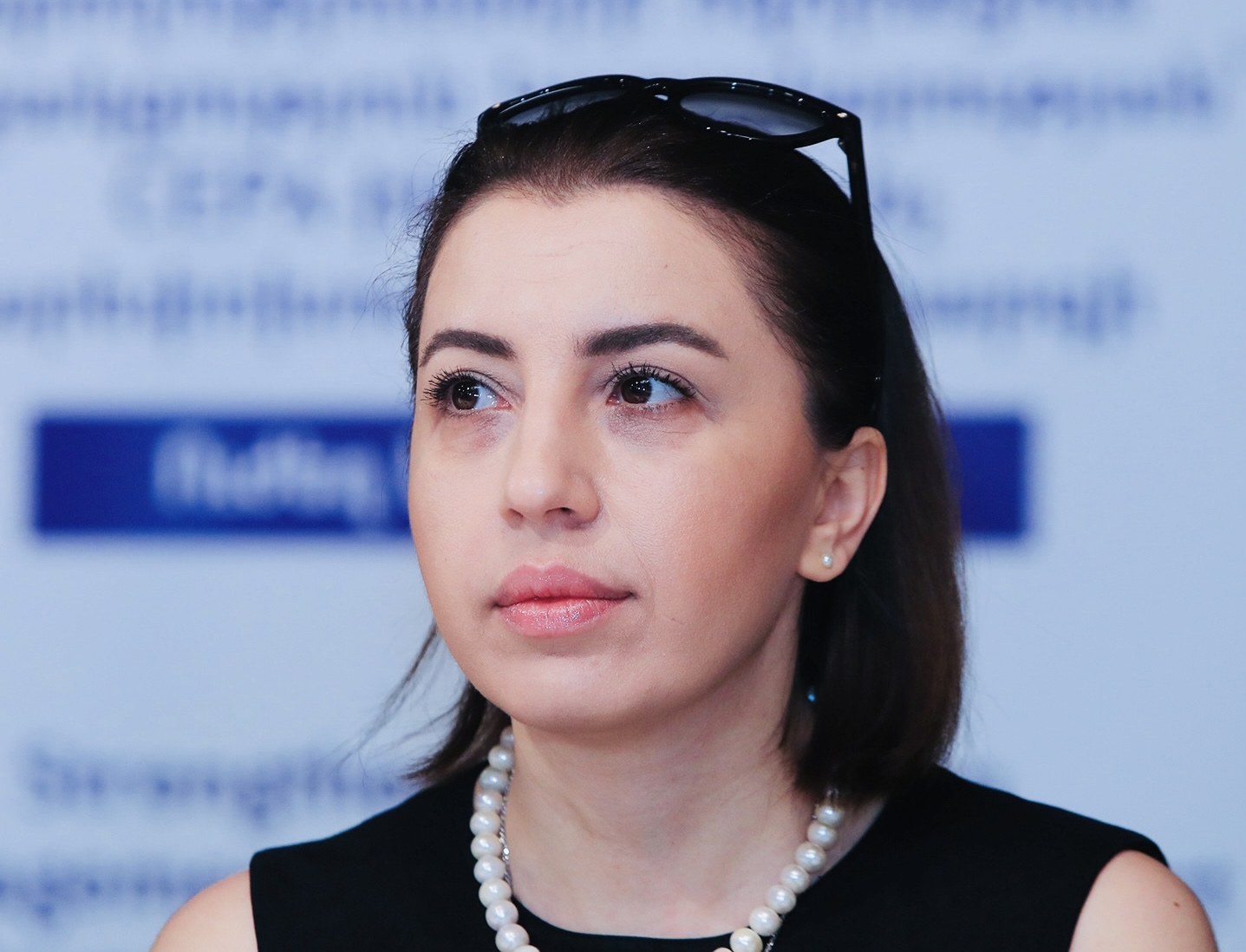
- Grigoryan in 2022

1st Director of the Foreign Intelligence Service of Armenia
- Incumbent
- Assumed office 4 October 2023
- Prime Minister: Nikol Pashinyan

5th Human Rights Defender of Armenia
- In office 24 January 2022 – 23 January 2023
- Preceded by: Arman Tatoyan
- Succeeded by: Anahit Manasyan

Personal details
- Born: August 27, 1981 (age 44) Sevan, Gegharkunik Province, Armenian SSR, Soviet Union
- Education: Yerevan State University (B.A., M.A.); Northern University (J.D.)
- Profession: Lawyer, intelligence officer

Kristinne Grigoryan (Armenian: Քրիստինե Գրիգորյան, born August 27, 1981) is an Armenian human rights lawyer and intelligence officer who serves as head of the Armenian Foreign Intelligence Service (FIS). She previously served as Deputy Minister of Justice and as the country's Human Rights Defender.

== Biography ==
Kristinne Grigoryan was born on August 27, 1981, in the town of Sevan, Gegharkunik Province, growing up during the final years of the Armenian Soviet Socialist Republic and the Soviet Union. In 1998, she entered Yerevan State University, graduating with her bachelor's degree in Arab Studies in 2002, and a master's degree in the same subject area in 2006. In 2008, she graduated from the law school of Northern University in Yerevan.

== Career ==
From 2004 at the completion of her undergraduate studies through 2009, Grigoryan worked as a legislative staffer in the National Assembly (NA) of Armenia in the Department of Legislative Analysis and Development. From March to October 2009, she was a translator-lawyer for the Assembly's Department of External Relations. Between 2009 and 2011, Grigoryan moved to serve as a Legal Aide to the Chief of Staff of the National Assembly. An aide to a member of parliament (2011–2014) and an Assistant to the NA Chairman on legal affairs (2012–2014), she led a team as part of the USAID-funded program "Support to the Development of Institutional Capacities of the National Assembly of Armenia" between 2014 and 2015. From 2015 to 2018, Grigoryan headed the Department of International Legal Cooperation at the staff of the Ministry of Justice. After the 2018 Armenian Velvet Revolution, she served as an advisor to Ararat Mirzoyan, the First Deputy Prime Minister at the time. On 3 July 2018, Grigoryan was appointed a Deputy Minister of Justice by the prime minister.

On 24 January 2022, the National Assembly elected her as the Human Rights Defender of Armenia. She stepped down from office on 23 January 2023, citing promotion to a new office as the reason behind her decision.

== Intelligence career ==
On 4 October 2023, Kristinne Grigoryan was publicly appointed the first chief of Armenia's civilian-led Foreign Intelligence Service by Prime Minister Nikol Pashinyan. Grigoryan is widely rumored to have received training in leadership and tradecraft in the West prior to taking office, reportedly with the U.S. Central Intelligence Agency and/or British MI6. Senior officials from both services including the heads of the respective agencies, Bill Burns and Richard Moore, visited Yerevan repeatedly around the time of the agency's 2022 establishment. Burns and his deputy David S. Cohen since visited again in 2024, and Moore met privately with Prime Minister Pashinyan at the Munich Security Conference in 2023.

== Personal life ==
Grigoryan is nonpartisan member of the civil service. She is a skilled linguist, speaking six languages: Armenian, Russian, English, French, German and Arabic. She is unmarried.
