= Larisa Alaverdyan =

Armenian politician

- Լարիսա Ալավերդյան

1st Ombudsman
- In office 1 March 2004 – 20 February 2006
- President: Robert Kocharyan
- Preceded by: Office established
- Succeeded by: Armen Harutyunyan

Member of the National Assembly
- In office 2007–2012

Personal details
- Born: September 21, 1943 (age 82) Baku, Azerbaijan SSR, Soviet Union
- Party: Founding Parliament
- Education: Azerbaijan State Pedagogical University

Larisa Asaturi Alaverdyan (Armenian: Լարիսա Ասատուրի Ալավերդյան; born 21 September 1943), is an Armenian pedagogue and politician who served as the first Human Rights Defender of Armenia (Ombudsman), member of the National Assembly between 2007 and 2012 and leader of the faction of party Founding Parliament between 2009 and 2012.

== Biography ==
Alaverdyan was born in Baku, now governed by the Republic of Azerbaijan. After graduating from the State Pedagogical Institute of Azerbaijan in 1966, she started her pedagogical work as a teacher of mathematics and drawing. Between 1966 and 1967, she was teacher of maths in a rural secondary school.

From 1991 to 1995, she was the chief expert of the Special Commission of the Supreme Council of Armenia in issues related to Nagorno-Karabakh, and since 2006 is the executive director of the NGO "Against the Violation of Law".

She is the director of Institute of Law and Politics of the Russian-Armenian University, where she teaches since 2002.

She participated in the European Union-Armenia parliamentary cooperative committee in the 10th meeting between 24 and 26 November 2008.

== Career as Ombudsman ==
The office of Human Rights Defender, or Ombudsman, of Armenia was created by law in October 2003, and on 19 February 2004 Larisa Alaverdyan was appointed to the office by presidential decree, assuming the office on 1 March 2004.

She helped the creation of the rehabilitation center of the South Caucasus for the victims of organized violence. This center managed to bring back home some Armenian children( 1992 to 1996).
