= Founding Parliament (Armenia) =

Pre-Parliament
- Նախախորհրդարան
- Purpose: Political reform
- Headquarters: Yerevan
- Location: Armenia
- Coordinator: Garegin Chugaszyan
- Website: Official Website

Pre-Parliament (Armenian: Նախախորհրդարան, Nakhakhorhrdaran) is an Armenian civil initiative, formed partly by the Sardarapat Movement on 15 November 2012.

== Membership ==
Its notable members include:

- Jirair Sefilian, Lebanese-born Armenian military commander of the First Nagorno-Karabakh War, known for his role during the Capture of Shusha
- Tigran Khzmalyan, filmmaker
- Larisa Alaverdyan, Armenia's former Ombudsman
- Alexander Yenikomshian, former member of the Armenian Secret Army for the Liberation of Armenia
- Hranush Kharatyan, ethnographer

== Arrests ==
On April 7, 2015, police in Yerevan arrested five members of Pre-Parliament: its chairman, Garegin Chugaszyan, founding member Jirair Sefilyan, as well as Varuzhan Avetisyan, Pavel Manukyan, and Gevorg Safaryan. Police searched the men's homes and Pre-Parliament's office, and seized wooden bats, kitchen knives, a stun gun, and a publicly available Pre-Parliament pamphlet published last year. The police also seized flags of Armenia, Nagorno-Karabakh, and the Pre-Parliament.

On April 9, the Special Investigation Service charged all five men with planning a mass disturbance (art. 225 part 1 of the Criminal Code) and preparation of a crime (Art. 35). Lawyers for the men told Human Rights Watch that the charges stem from Pre-Parliament's plans to hold a rally in Yerevan on April 24, the day of commemoration of the 100-year anniversary of the Armenian genocide. The group had applied for permission to hold the rally, which the Yerevan authorities approved near the Erebuni Library. Pre-Parliament advertised a rally that would not interfere with events commemorating the anniversary of the genocide. According to the men's lawyers, the charges are also based on the Pre-Parliament's booklet, which describes the group's aim of a change of government of Armenia through peaceful means, including civil disobedience.

On April 10, the Kentron Nork-Marash district court in Yerevan approved the investigation's request for remand detention and sent all five men to pretrial custody. Following the court's ruling, authorities transferred Sefilyan, Avetisyan, and Manukyan to the Vardashen prison, and Chukaszyan and Safaryan to the Nubarashen prison where they are in custody with the general prison population. Their lawyers have expressed concern about over crowding in some of the cells.

After his April 7 arrest, Pavel Manukyan declared a hunger strike that lasted several days and ended some time before April 13. One of Safaryan's lawyers reported that he declared a hunger strike on April 20, possibly in response to mistreatment by cellmates. At the time he was in a cell with 17 people, with only nine beds. After Safaryan declared a hunger strike, a doctor examined him to assess his general health and he was moved to a cell with other people on hunger strikes. As of April 27, he had not received further visits from any medical personnel.

Pre-Parliament members were being targeted for their peaceful political beliefs and that the charges are intended to interfere with their right to freedom of thought, expression, and assembly as protected by the International Covenant on Civil and Political Rights (ICCPR), to which Armenia is a party. Article 225 of Armenia's Criminal Code, under which the men are charged, prohibits “organizing mass disorder accompanied with violence, pogroms, arson, destruction or damage to property, using fire-arms, explosives or explosive devices, or by armed resistance to the representative of the authorities.” Pre-Parliament's booklet and advertisement for the rally call for civil disobedience and peaceful political change.

Further, pre-trial detention should be considered a last resort. Article 9(3) of the ICCPR states that, “It shall not be the general rule that persons awaiting trial shall be detained in custody.” The United Nations Human Rights Committee, which provides authoritative interpretation of the covenant, has determined that bail should be granted except in cases in which there is a likelihood that the accused would abscond, destroy evidence, or influence witnesses. Given Pre-Parliament's nonviolent views and in the absence of a lawful and credible basis for detention, the men should be freed, pending investigation.

The men, who are currently under investigation, were in custody with convicted criminals in violation of international standards on pre-trial detention. ICCPR article 10(2)(a) mandates that accused persons shall be segregated from convicted persons and accorded treatment appropriate for their status as non-convicted persons. According to their lawyers, the prison authorities have not allowed the men to receive visits from family members, which are permitted during pre-trial detention at the discretion of the prison authorities. Such discretion should not be used to withhold privileges to punish the men for their political beliefs or affiliations.

In light of these concerns, Human Rights Watch called upon Armenia's Prosecutor General's office to:

- Independently review the charges, which appear intended to interfere with the Pre-Parliament members’ rights to expression and assembly;

- Release all five men from custody, pending a prompt, impartial, and credible investigation into their charges;

- Until such time as they are released pending an independent investigation into the charges:

- Take immediate steps to ensure that Chugaszyan, Sefilyan, Avetisyan, Manukyan, and Safaryan are held in facilities separate from convicted inmates, and have access to appropriate medical care and independent legal counsel.

- Ensure that Chugaszyan, Sefilyan, Avetisyan, Manukyan, and Safaryan may receive family visits as permitted by regulations.

- Investigate allegations that Safaryan has been subjected to ill-treatment by his cellmates and take appropriate measures to ensure his safety.
