= Foreign Intelligence Service (Armenia) =

External intelligence agency of Armenia

Foreign Intelligence Service of the Republic of Armenia
- Հայաստանի Հանրապետության Արտաքին Հետախուզության Ծառայություն
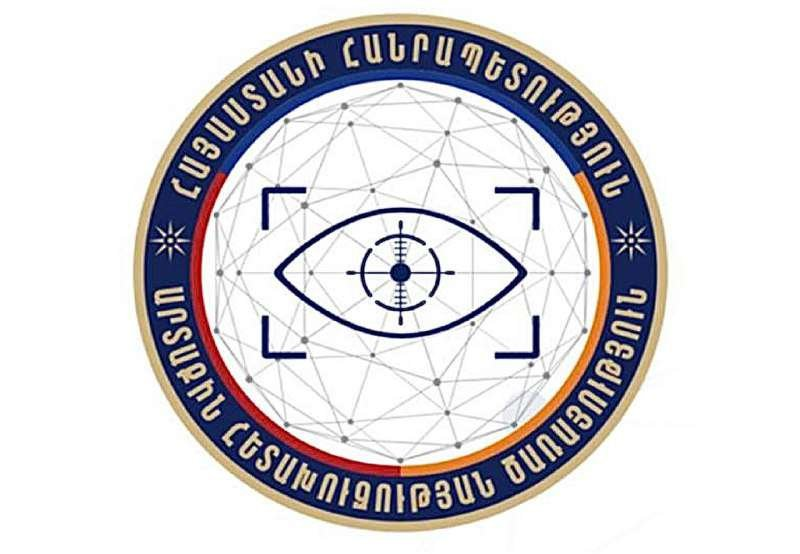
- Seal of the FIS

Agency overview
- Formed: 4 October 2023; 3 years ago
- Preceding agency: National Security Service
- Jurisdiction: Government of Armenia
- Headquarters: Yerevan
- Employees: classified
- Annual budget: classified
- Minister responsible: Prime Minister of Armenia
- Agency executives: Kristinne Grigoryan, Director of the FIS; Hrant Gilavyan, Deputy Director; Arman Boshyan, Deputy Director

The Foreign Intelligence Service (Note: Armenian: Հայաստանի Հանրապետության Արտաքին Հետախուզության Ծառայություն, romanized: Hayastani Hanrapetut’yan Artak’in Hetakhuzut’yan Tsarrayut’yunp) (FIS) is Armenia's principal foreign intelligence agency. A mostly civilian agency, the FIS falls under the direct supervision of the Office of the Prime Minister of Armenia. It is headquartered in Yerevan.

Established in October 2023, the FIS was created to replace the incumbent National Security Service (NSS), a mostly uniformed military intelligence organization which lost the trust of the country's leadership after the agency's loyalty came into question amidst frayed relations between Armenia and Russia. While the NSS is a direct successor to the KGB of Soviet Armenia, the FIS is intended to break with past institutional influences and has been established with input and assistance from western intelligence services, including the American CIA and British MI6.

== History ==
In late 2022, the National Assembly of Armenia announced the intent to create a civilian foreign intelligence service to replace the National Security Service and intelligence components within the Armed Forces of Armenia. Armen Grigorian, the secretary of the Security Council, announced it will be tasked with "collecting information about the security situation around Armenia." Opposition lawmakers criticized the government, with Gegham Manukian of the opposition Armenia Alliance saying that it will "only weaken the existing structures within the NSS and the Defense Ministry." In October 2023, Kristinne Grigoryan, a human rights lawyer, was appointed as the FIS's first director.

== Publications ==
In January 2025, the FIS published its first public assessment, the Annual Report on External Security Risks of the Republic of Armenia for 2025, which highlighted a need to prioritize "Armenia's resilience in combating hybrid warfare." While the report did not directly indict Russian activities, it sharply criticized the Russian-led Collective Security Treaty Organization (CSTO), which Armenia froze its membership in 2024. The report concluded that the organization's "incapacity (non-viability) to respond to the issues in the South Caucasus that are within CSTO statutory objectives, highly likely will not change."

== See also ==
- National Security Service (Armenia)
- Committee for State Security of the Armenian Soviet Socialist Republic
