= Committee for State Security of the Armenian Soviet Socialist Republic =

Soviet KGB intelligence agency

Committee for State Security of the Armenian Soviet Socialist Republic (Russian:Комитет государственной безопасности Армянской ССР) or KGB of ArSSR was the security agency of the Armenian Soviet Socialist Republic, being the local branch of Committee for State Security of the USSR. It was the principal intelligence agency of Armenia from 1954 to 1991. It was succeeded by the National Security Service after the collapse of the Soviet Union. The KGB in Armenia often provided undercover agents to be stationed inside the Armenian Apostolic Church, due to the church's prevalence in the country. The Armenian KGB fell under the direct control of the Central Committee of the Communist Party of Armenia, although the Communist Party of the Soviet Union could take control and also direct its activities.

== History ==
In 1929, the NKVD of the Armenian SSR, which was the Armenian equivalent to the national NKVD headquarters in Moscow was dissolved and was reestablished in 5 years later as a more organized political department. In February 1941 the People's Commissariat for State Security of USSR was made into an independent institution from the NKVD, before it was reunited again that July. On 13 March 1954, the Supreme Soviet of USSR made the decision to create a republican affiliate for the Committee of State Security (KGB) in the republic. During its existence, it was subordinate to the Council of Ministers of Armenian SSR. In April 1990, the KGB headquarters in Yerevan, the capital of Armenia, was burned down by rioters as a result of the agency's arrest of four people on accusations of stealing Soviet Army weapons. In September 1991, the Supreme Soviet of Armenia signed the Declaration of State Sovereignty of Armenia, which resulted in the agency's disestablishment in December of that year.

== Chairmen ==
- George Badamyants (May 18, 1954 - November 21, 1972)
- Arkady Ragozin (November 21, 1972 - November 24, 1975)
- Hrayr Mikhaelyan (November 24, 1975 - June 28, 1978)
- Marius Yuzbashyan (June 28, 1978 - October 25, 1988)
- Valery Badamyants (October 25, 1988 - September 13, 1990)
- Usik Harutyunyan (September 13, 1990 - December 4, 1991)
