= Geghamavan =

Village in Gegharkunik, Armenia

Geghamavan Գեղամավան
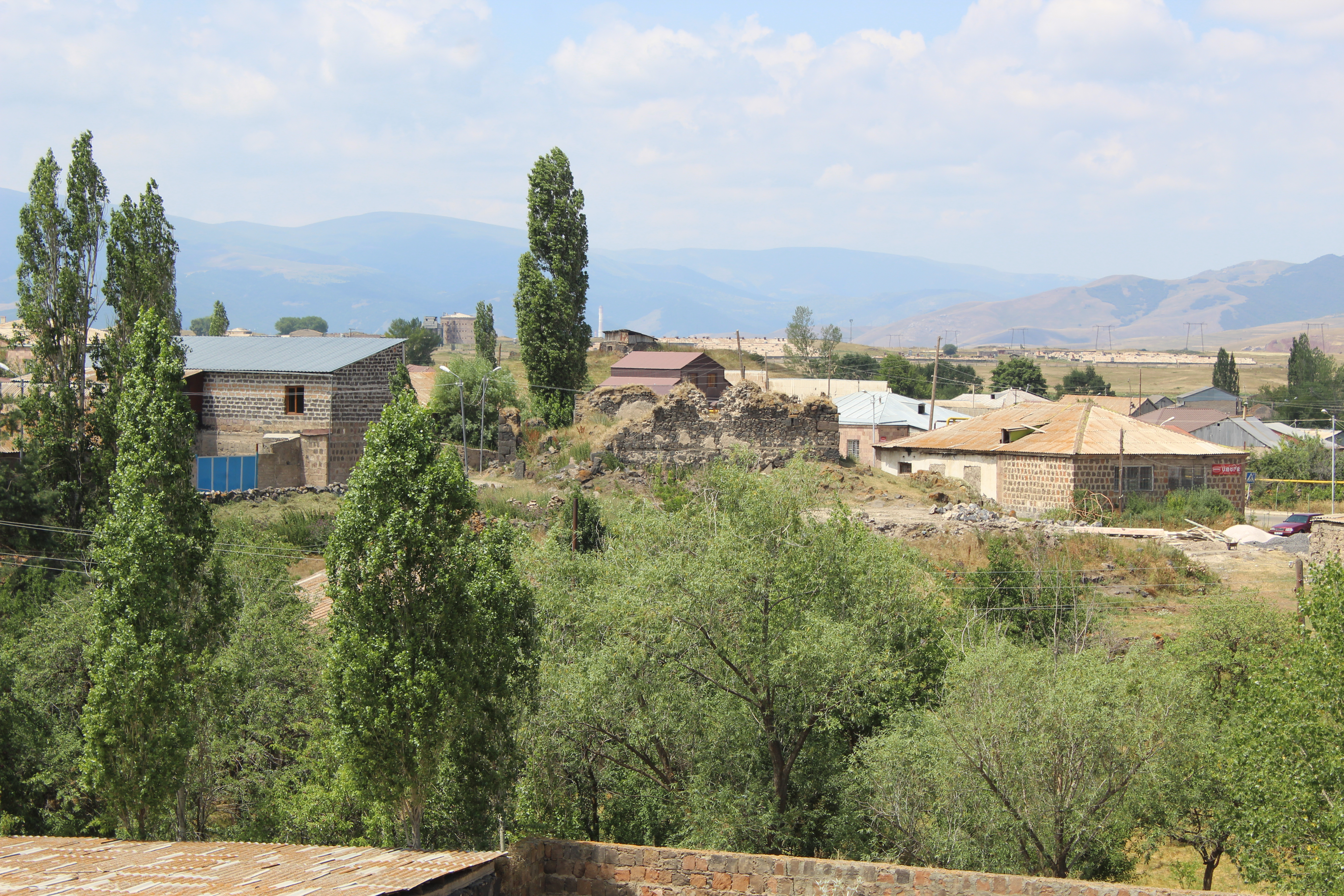
- A view of Geghamavan and St. Hovhannes Church

- Location within Armenia Location within Gegharkunik
- Coordinates: 40°33′43″N 44°53′15″E
- Country: Armenia
- Province: Gegharkunik
- Municipality: Sevan
- Founded: 1830s

Area
  - Total: 29.48 km^{2} (11.38 sq mi)
- Elevation: 1,842 m (6,043 ft)

Population (2011)
  - Total: 1,721
  - Density: 58.38/km^{2} (151.2/sq mi)
- Time zone: UTC+4 (AMT)
- Postal code: 1507

Geghamavan (Armenian: Գեղամավան) is a village in the Sevan Municipality of the Gegharkunik Province of Armenia.

== History ==
The village was founded in the 1830s by migrants from the Maku region of Persia. There are church/shrine ruins in the eastern part of the village.

== Gallery ==
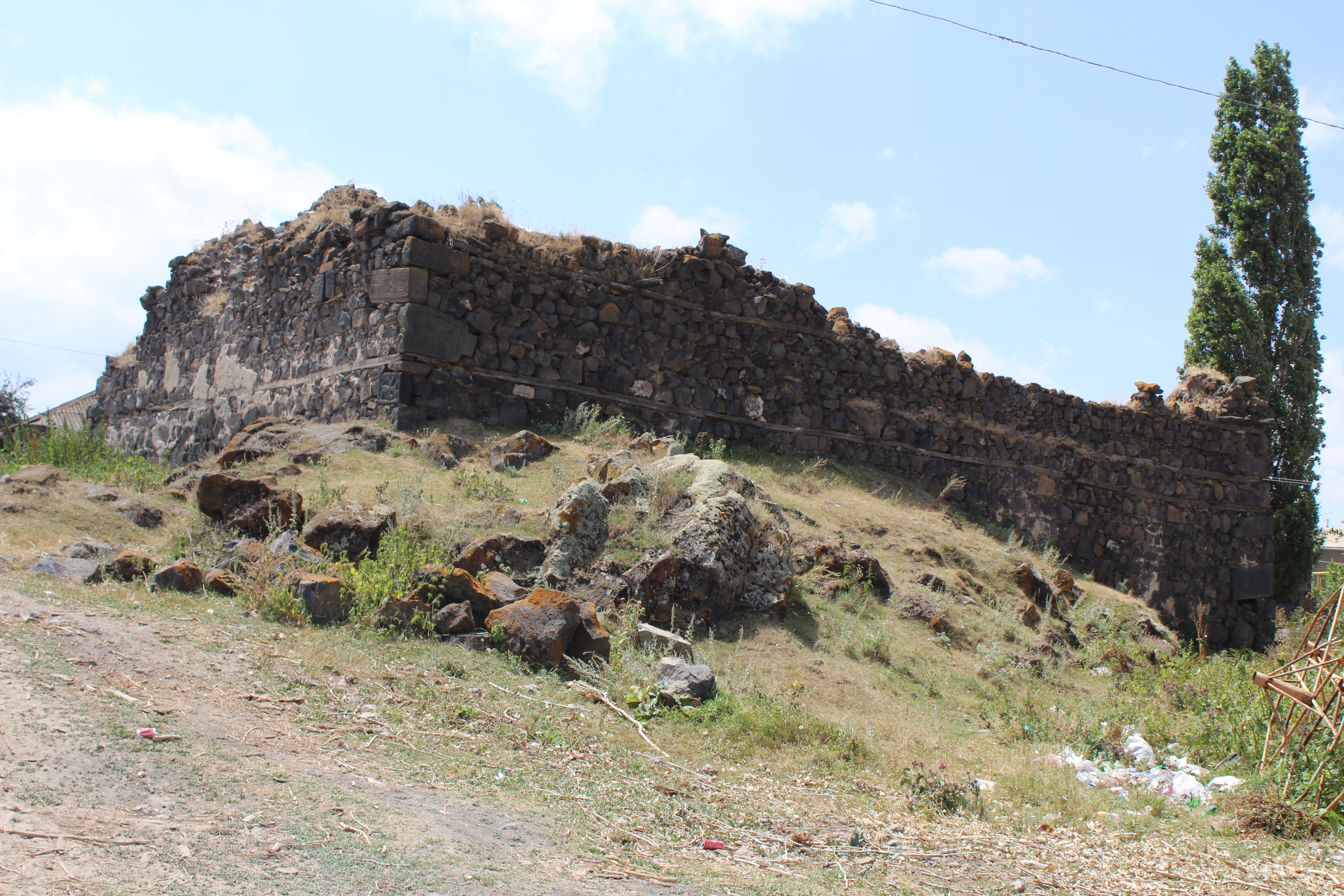
St. Hovhannes Church

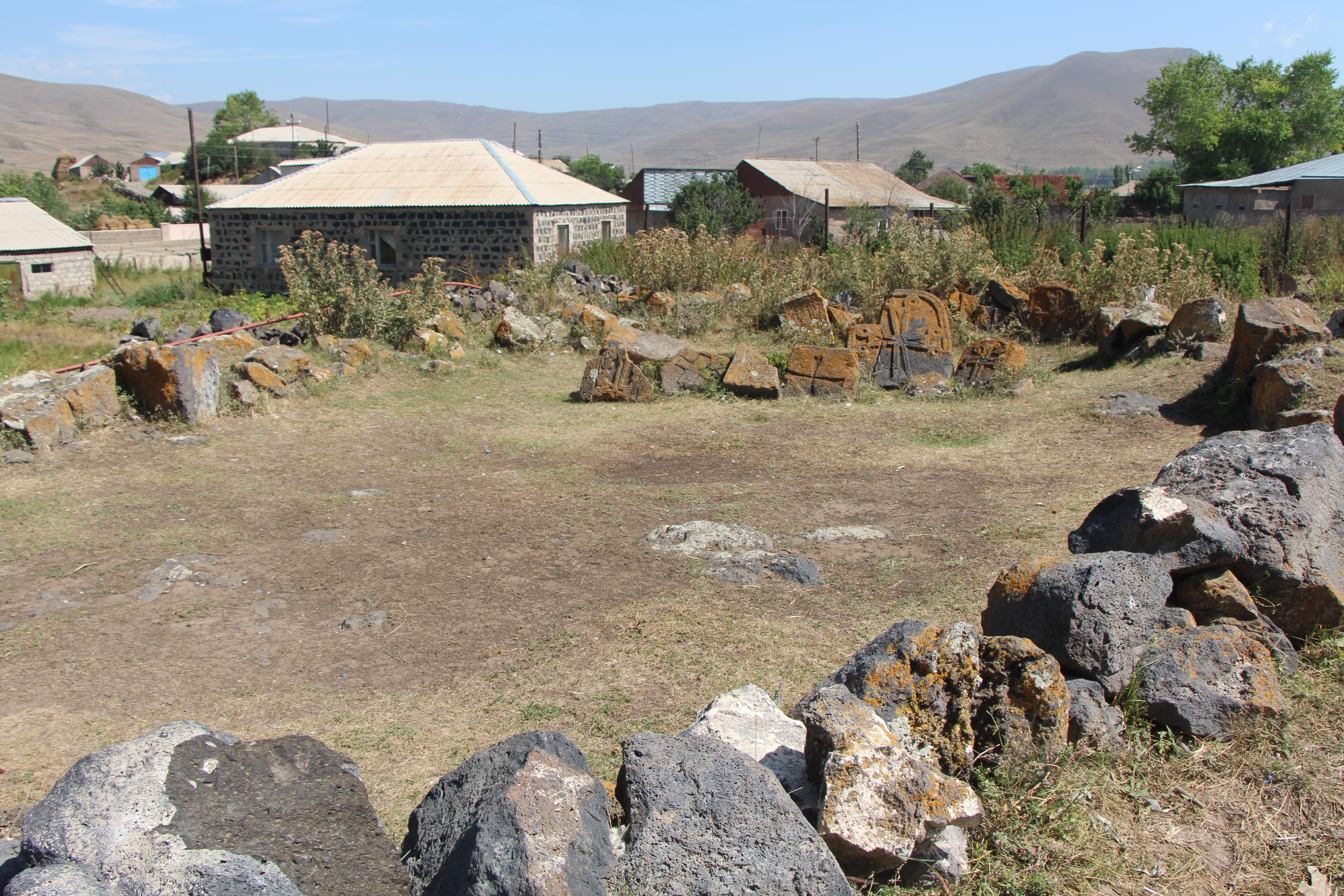
Ruined church in Geghamavan

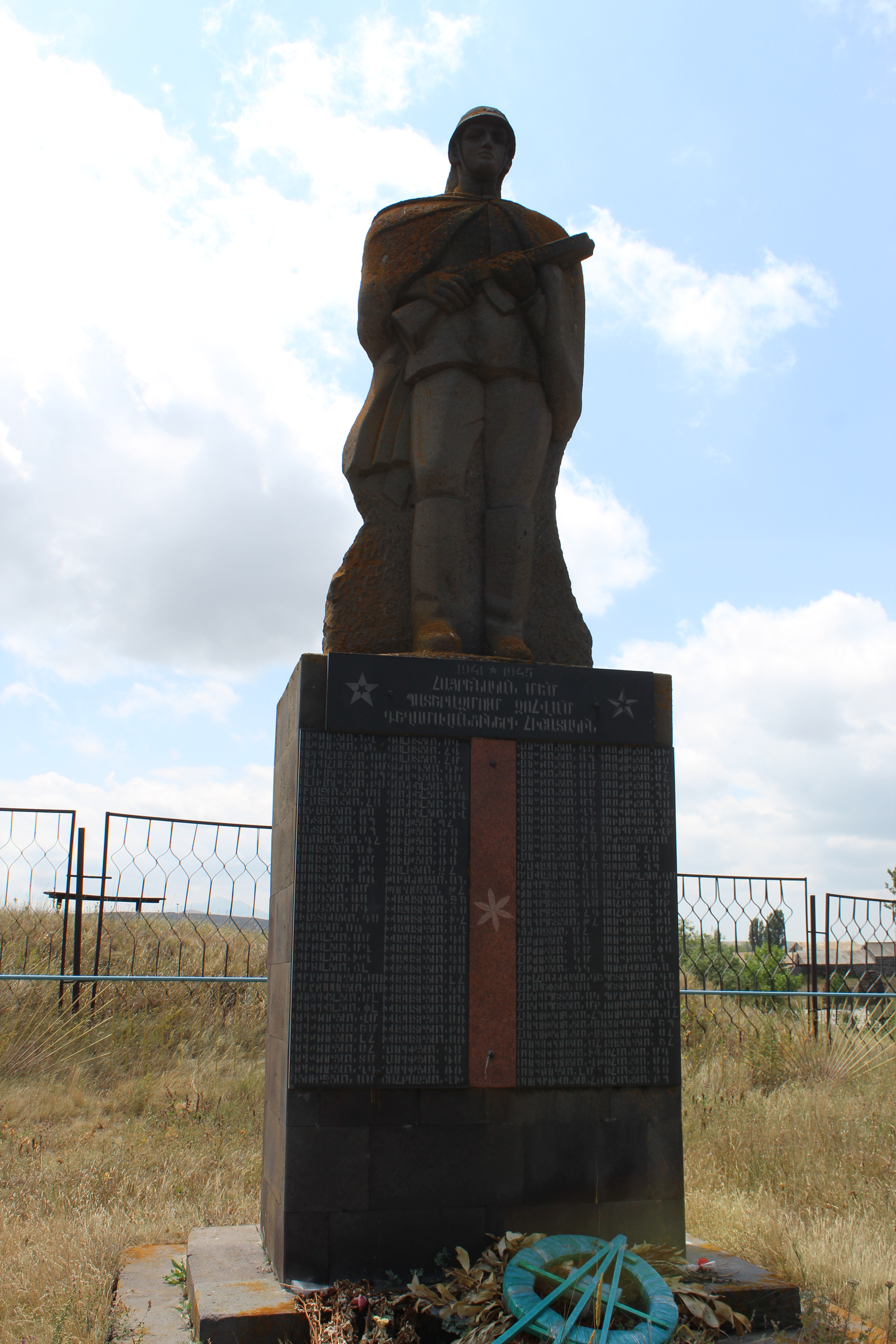
WWII monument

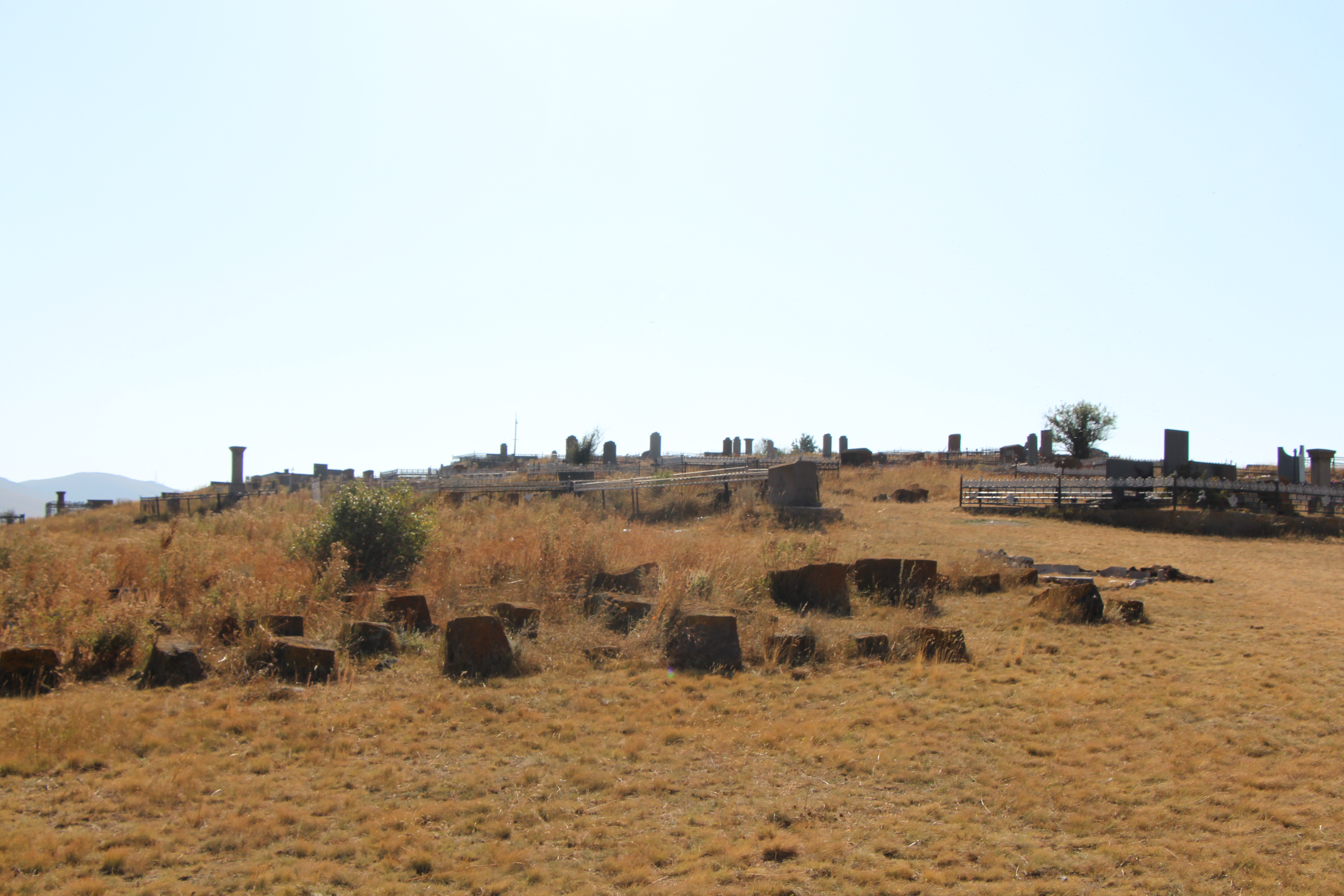
Cemetery in Geghamavan
