= Dağ Cəyir =

- Municipality
- Location within Azerbaijan
- Coordinates: 40°42′23″N 45°55′31″E
- Country: Azerbaijan
- Rayon: Shamkir
- Time zone: UTC+4 (AZT)
  - Summer (DST): UTC+5 (AZT)

Dağ Cəyir (also, Dag Dzheir, Dagdzhagir, and Dzhagir) is a village and municipality in the Shamkir Rayon of Azerbaijan.
