= Mikayel Melkumyan =

Armenian politician

- Միքայել Մելքումյան

Deputy Speaker of National Assembly of Armenia
- In office 19 May 2017 – 14 January 2019
- Speaker: Ara Babloyan

National Assembly Deputy
- Incumbent
- Assumed office 2012

Personal details
- Born: 1 April 1962 (age 64) Yerevan, Armenian SSR, Soviet Union
- Party: Prosperous Armenia
- Education: Armenian State University of Economics
- Occupation: economist

Mikayel Melkumyan (Armenian: Միքայել Սերգեյի Մելքումյան; born 1 April 1962) is an Armenian politician. He was first elected to the Armenian National Assembly in 2012 as a member of the Prosperous Armenia Party. He was re-elected in the 2017 Armenian parliamentary election and subsequently chosen as one of three Deputy Speakers of the National Assembly.

== Biography ==
Mikayel Melkumyan was born on 1 April 1962 in Yerevan. He has served in the Soviet Army.

== Education ==
In 1983 Melkumyan graduated from Armenian State University of Economics, receiving the qualification of an economist. He later pursued his post-graduate studies at the same institution, earning the degree of a Doctor. Mikael Melkumyan also holds the title of Professor of Economics.

== Career ==
From 1987 until 1998 Melkumyan was a professor at the ASIE Chair of Industrial Economics. Between 1999 and 2000, he was the chief of staff at the Ministry of Social Security. Since 2000, he has been a professor at the ASUE Chair in Microeconomics and Entrepreneurial Activity. Also in 2000, Melkumyan was appointed a deputy minister of state property management, a post which he held until 2003.

== Engagement in politics ==
Melkumyan was elected to the Armenian National Assembly three times: on 6 May 2012, as a proportional representation candidate from the Prosperous Armenia party, on 2 April 2017, as a member of Tsarukyan Alliance, a political bloc led by Gagik Tsarukyan, the leader of the Prosperous Armenia party, and on 9 December 2018, again as a representative of Prosperous Armenia.

== Personal life ==
Mikayel Melkumyan is married and has three sons.

== Published works ==
- Use of Secondary Raw in the Republic of Armenia: Existing Problems and Challenges, Yerevan, 1991
- Entrepreneurship and Investments, Yerevan, 1998
- State Property Management and Business, Yerevan, 2001
- Entrepreneurship and Business, Yerevan, 2006

== Awards ==
- Mkhitar Gosh Medal (2016)
