= Anahit Manasyan =

Armenian lawyer

- Անահիտ Մանասյան

Human Rights Defender of Armenia
- Incumbent
- Assumed office 12 April 2023

Personal details
- Born: 24 June 1988 (age 38) Yerevan, Armenia
- Education: Yerevan State University
- Profession: Lawyer

Anahit Artyomi Manasyan (Armenian: Անահիտ Արտյոմի Մանասյան; born 24 June 1988) is an Armenian lawyer who serves as the current Human Rights Defender of Armenia since 2023.

== Biography ==
Anahit Manasyan was born on 24 June 1988, in Yerevan. From 2004 to 2008, she studied and graduated with honors from YSU Faculty of Law, from 2008 to 2010, she studied and graduated with honors from YSU Faculty of Law (master's program), in 2013, she pursued the postgraduate program at Yerevan State University (YSU) Faculty of Law. In January–June 2016, she studied at the Fletcher School at Tufts University, U.S.

== Career ==
In 2008-2009, she served as an expert on the staff of the Armenian Minister of Justice. From 2009 to 2013, she worked as an Assistant to the President of the Constitutional Court of Armenia. Additionally, between 2010 and 2015, she held the position of a lecturer at the Chair of Constitutional Law at Yerevan State University. In 2012, she completed an internship at the Constitutional Court of Hungary.

From 2014 to July 2021, she was a lecturer at the Academy of Justice of Armenia. From 2013 to 2014, she served as an advisor to the President of the Constitutional Court of Armenia, and from 2014 to December 2016 she held the position of senior advisor to the President of the Constitutional Court of Armenia. From December 2016 to March 2018, she became an adviser to the Constitutional Court of Armenia.

During the period from February 2017 to January 2019, she assumed the role of Vice-Rector of the Academy of Justice for Scientific Affairs. From January 2019 to July 2021, she served as the vice-rector of the Academy of Justice of Armenia, from 2015 to now, she is an associate Professor at the Chair of Constitutional Law of Yerevan State University. From April to August 2022 she served as a senior Legal Expert of the EU-funded project "Consolidation of the Justice System in Armenia", from November 2022 to April 2023, she held the position of the Deputy Prosecutor General of the Republic of Armenia. Since 20 December 2023, member (Armenia) of the European Committee for the Prevention of Torture and Inhuman or Degrading Treatment or Punishment (CPT). Since 1 March 2024, member of the Governing Board of the European Network of National Human Rights Institutions (ENNHRI). On 12 April 2023, she was elected as the Human Rights Defender by the National Assembly.

== Participation in professional/scientific structures ==
From 2008 until the present, she is a member of the Armenian Lawyers Association, from 2012 to 2017 she served as a regional analyst for the international scientific journal "Comparative Constitutional Review", published in Moscow. From 2012 to 2018, she held the role of a member of the editorial group of the Russian Annex to the Bulletin of the Constitutional Court of Armenia, from 2013 to 2020, she served as a member of the editorial board of territorial "South Caucasus Law Journal". From 2016 to 2017, she served as a member of the working group for developing the Draft Constitutional Law on the Constitutional Court of Armenia. From 2016 to now she is a member of the Board of Trustees of the International Analytical Centre "Constitutional Culture". From 2015 to 2019, she assumed the role of the scientific secretary of professional council 001 on law at Yerevan State University of the Supreme Certifying Commission of the Republic of Armenia.

From 2015 to now she is a member of the professional council 001 on law at Yerevan State University of the Supreme Certifying Commission of the Republic of Armenia. From 2019 to July 2021, she served as Armenian representative of the HELP online platform of the Council of Europe. From January 2020 till now, she is a member of the editorial board of the international academic journal "Journal of Political Science" published in Warsaw. From February 2021 till now she is a member of the editorial board of the international academic journal "JURIDICA" published in Ukraine. From January 2020 to January 2021 she served as a member of the Professional Committee for Constitutional Reforms of Armenia.

From August 2020 to November 2022, she served as a member of the Commission on Evaluation of the performance of Judges and from March to November 2022 she served as a member of the Professional Commission on Constitutional Reforms of the Republic of Armenia. From November 2022 to April 2023, she held the position of the President of the Editorial Board of Scientific journal "Legality" of the Prosecutor Office of Armenia. Since June 2023 she is a member of the Editorial Board. From November 2022 to April 2023 she held the position of the chairman of Ethics Committee adjunct to the Prosecutor General of Armenia, during the same period she was also a member of Governing Board of the Academy of Justice of Armenia. As of December 20, 2023, to present, she is a member of the European Committee for the Prevention of Torture and Inhuman or Degrading Treatment or Punishment (CPT). Since March 1, 2024 to March 10, 2025 she was a member of the Board of the European Network of National Human Rights Institutions (ENNHRI). As of October 16, 2025, to present, she is a member of the Governing Board of the Mediterranean Association of Ombudsmen.

== Other information ==
Anahit Manasyan is the author and co-author of 11 monographs, 4 manuals and more than 84 scientific articles, which were published by prestigious Armenian and international publishing houses (including in Great Britain, Germany, Poland, Lithuania, Latvia, Bosnia and Herzegovina, Russia, Ukraine, Moldova, Belarus).

As an expert, she has participated in the preparation of opinions, researches, and guidelines on numerous issues by various international organizations (OECD, Council of Europe, UN, etc.), and has given lectures during several international seminars and in several foreign scientific and educational institutions (including: in Georgia, Hungary, Ukraine).
