= Eduard Sharmazanov =

Armenian politician

- Էդուարդ Նոյեմիկ Շարմազանով
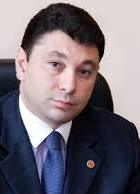

Vice President of National Assembly
- In office 12 June 2011 – 14 January 2019
- President: Ara Babloyan

Member of the National Assembly
- Incumbent
- Assumed office 12 May 2007

Spokesperson of Republican Party
- Incumbent
- Assumed office 2011

Personal details
- Born: 8 November 1975 (age 50) Alaverdi, Armenian SSR, Soviet Union
- Party: Republican Party of Armenia
- Children: 2
- Education: Armenian State Pedagogical University

Eduard Sharmazanov (Armenian: Էդուարդ Շարմազանով; born 8 November 1975) is an Armenian politician. Since 12 June 2011, he has been a Vice President of the National Assembly. After the 2017 Armenian parliamentary election, on 18 May 2017, he was re-elected to that position. Since 2011, he has been the spokesperson of Republican Party of Armenia.

On October 12, after the Armenian defeat on the 2020 Nagorno-Karabakh war, he was arrested among other opposition leaders on charges of "illegal conduction of rallies".
