= Vahe Enfiajyan =

Armenian politician

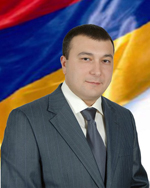
Vahe Enfiajyan

Vahe Enfiajyan (Armenian: Վահէ Էնֆիաջյան) (born 24 December 1978) is an Armenian politician who served as a member of the National Assembly of Armenia from the Prosperous Armenia Party from 2009 to 2021. He was Vice Speaker of the National Assembly from 14 January 2019 to 2021.
