= Arpine Hovhannisyan =

Armenian politician

- Արփինե Հովհաննիսյան
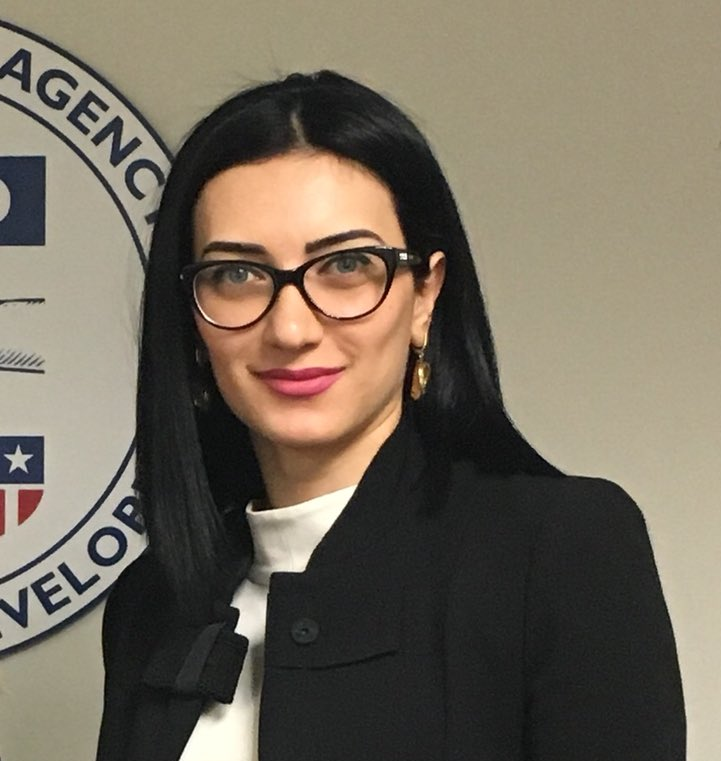
- Hovhannisyan in 2018

Vice President of National Assembly
- In office 18 May 2017 – 14 January 2019
- President: Ara Babloyan

Minister of Justice
- In office 4 Sep 2015 – 11 May 2017
- Prime Minister: Hovik Abrahamyan; Karen Karapetyan
- Preceded by: Hovhannes Manukyan
- Succeeded by: Davit Harutyunyan

Personal details
- Born: 4 December 1983 (age 42) Yerevan, Armenian SSR, Soviet Union
- Education: Yerevan State University
- Occupation: Lawyer

Arpine Hovhannisyan (Armenian: Արփինե Աշոտի Հովհաննիսյան; born 4 December 1983) is an Armenian politician, lawyer, former Minister of Justice of Armenia, and former vice president of the National Assembly of Armenia. Hovhannisyan is also the first female to ever hold the position of Justice Minister in Armenia. Currently a member of the Chamber of Advocates, she is fully engaged in a professional activity. During her political career, Hovhannisyan was member of the ruling Republican Party of Armenia (HHK), formerly a governing political force. She is not affiliated with any political party at present.

== Early life ==
Arpine Hovhannisyan was born on 4 December 1983 in Yerevan, Armenian Soviet Socialist Republic.

== Education ==
- 2000-2004 – Studied and graduated from the Yerevan State University Faculty of Law.
- 2004-2006 – Received her master's degree in law from the Yerevan State University.
- 2006-2009 – Postgraduate from the Yerevan State University. Candidate of Law Sciences.

== Career ==
- 2003-2006 – A specialist of the first category of the Division of Reforms of the Criminal Executive Service of the Judicial Reforms Department of the Staff of the Ministry of Justice of Armenia.
- 2006-2007 – Leading specialist.
- 2007 – Lecturer in the Civil Law Department of Yerevan State University.
- 2007-2008 – Deputy head of the Department of Examination of Legal Acts of the Staff of the Ministry of Justice of Armenia.
- May 19, 2008 - September 30, 2008 – Assistant to the Chief of the Staff of the President of Armenia.
- 2008-2011 - Adviser to the president of the National Assembly.
- May 6, 2012 - Elected deputy of the National Assembly by the proportional electoral system from the Republican Party of Armenia.
- September 4, 2015 – President Serzh Sargsyan of Armenia signed a decree to appoint Arpine Hovhannisyan Minister of Justice.
- April 2, 2017 - elected a deputy of the National Assembly from the Republican Party of Armenia in nationwide elections.
- May 19, 2017 - elected vice president of the RA National Assembly. 73 MPs voted in favor of Arpine Hovhannisyan, 22 were against. 100 MPs took part in the voting, with 5 ballots declared invalid.

== Personal life ==
Arpine Hovhannisyan is married and has a son. She is a supporter of involving more women in Armenian politics, and has stated that the relatively low number of female deputies in Armenia is not due to legal discrimination, but women's psychology.

== Critics ==
She was criticized for the death of previously imprisoned citizen Arthur Sargsyan. On March 17, 2017, participants of a demonstration in Yerevan demanded bringing to justice Minister of Justice Hovhannisyan, as well as all investigators who sentenced Sargsyan to detention, which indirectly led to his death.

Political offices
Preceded by Hovhannes Manukyan	Minister of Justice of Armenia; 2015–2017	Succeeded by Davit Harutyunyan
