= National Security Service (Armenia) =

State agency of Armenia

National Security Service of Armenia
- Հայաստանի Ազգային Անվտանգության Ծառայություն
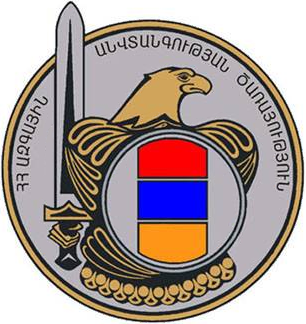
- Seal of the NSS

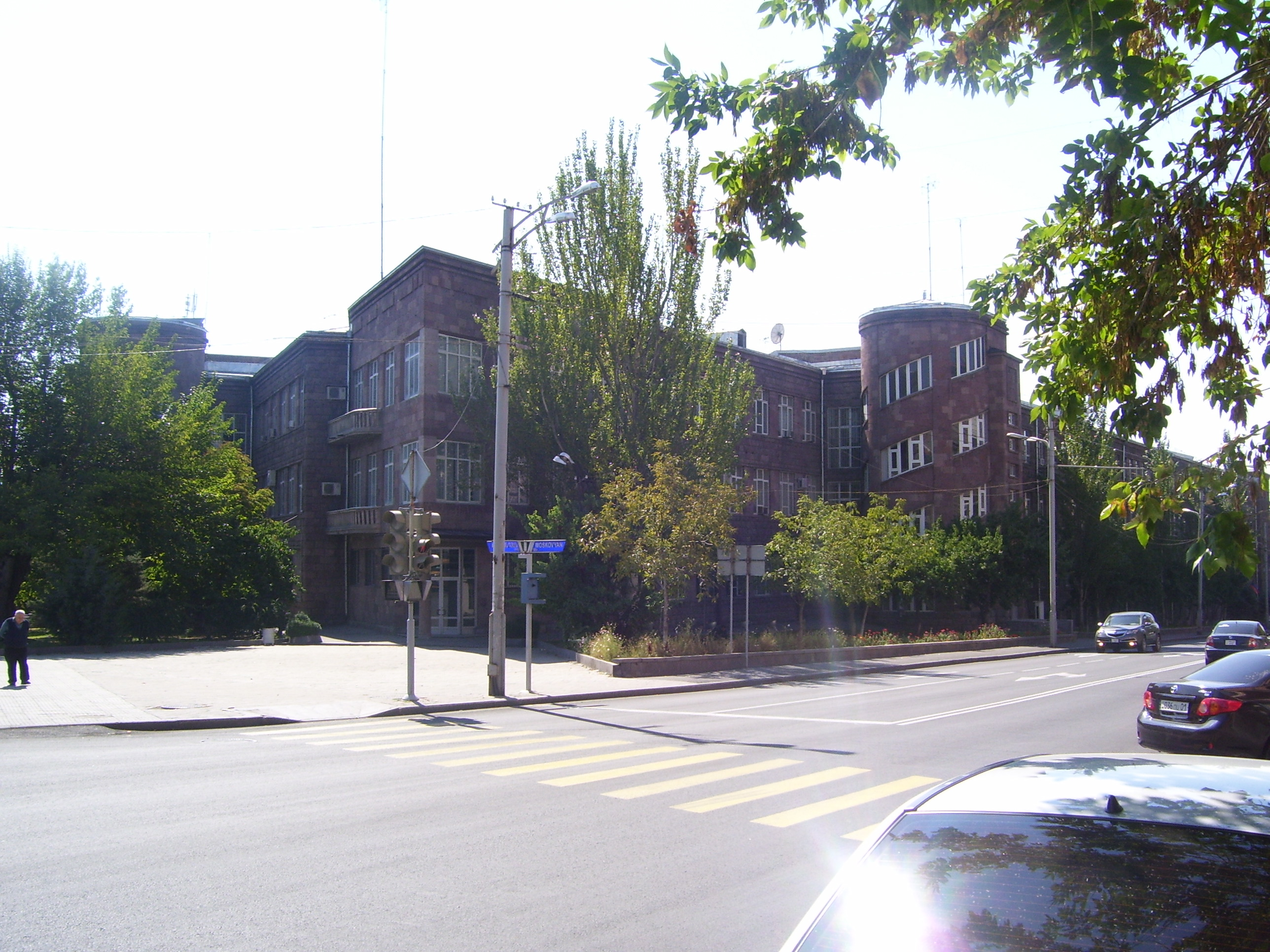
- NSS headquarters in Yerevan

Agency overview
- Formed: 4 December 1991
- Preceding agency: KGB of the Armenian Soviet Socialist Republic
- Superseding agency: Foreign Intelligence Service of Armenia
- Jurisdiction: Government of Armenia
- Headquarters: Yerevan, Armenia 40.182°N 44.523°E
- Agency executive: Major General Andranik Simonyan, Director of the National Security Service
- Website: www.sns.am

The National Security Service (NSS) (Armenian: Հայաստանի Ազգային Անվտանգության Ծառայություն, romanized: Hayastani Azgayin Anvtangut’yan Tsarrayut’yun) is the domestic security service of Armenia, responsible for national security and intelligence matters. The service is also responsible for the Armenian Border Guard. The NSS is currently headquartered on Nalbandyan Street in the Kentron district of downtown Yerevan.

== History ==
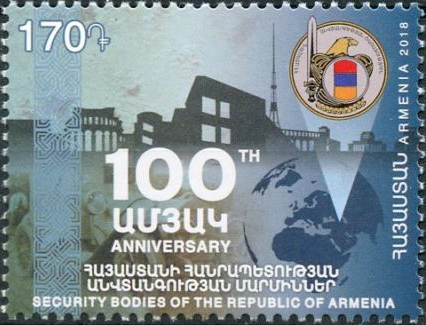
A 2018 stamp dedicated to the 100th anniversary of the security services of Armenia

In late September 1991, Soviet Armenia declared its independence and began the process of restructuring its Soviet-era security agencies, including the Committee for State Security (KGB) of the Armenian SSR. According to a law on the structure and composition of the government adopted on 4 December 1991, the KGB was renamed the State Directorate of National Security, with Major General Husik Suren Harutyunyan becoming its first director, serving until February 1992.

Between 1996 and 1999, the government went through the process of uniting the Ministry of National Security and the Ministry of Internal Affairs into one department. Despite rumors that the NSS will be dismembered into several departments to follow a Russian format, the service runs with a KGB-style semi-militarized structure which remains unchanged since its establishment. On 17 December 2002, President Robert Kocharyan restructured the National Security Ministry into the NSS.

=== Divestment from the NSS ===
The NSS, the direct successor of the Soviet KGB of the Armenian SSR, was once responsible for all domestic and foreign intelligence and counterintelligence affairs, as well as the security detail for the Prime Minister of Armenia. Now, it has lost those missions, in part because of a perception within the Armenian government that the agency maintains its own interests and alliances inconsistent with national interests. Many of its duties have been divested to other government agencies:

- Foreign Intelligence Service, a civilian-run agency established in 2023 concerned with collection of foreign intelligence.
- State Protection Service, an agency concerned with the tasks related to the protection of several high-ranking state officials,.

It is expected to be entirely dissolved within three years.

== Operations ==
It is known to have participated in both the 2016 Yerevan hostage crisis and the 2018 anti-corruption crackdown. During the 2020 Nagorno-Karabakh war, 46 servicemen of the NSS Border Troops were killed, with 191 others wounded, and 2 declared missing. During the protests following the 2020 Karabakh ceasefire agreement, the NSS foiled an assassination attempt on Prime Minister Nikol Pashinyan, uncovering the illegal acquisition and storage of weapons and explosives by a group of people led by former NSS operative and director Artur Vanetsyan.

== Structure ==
The NSS has traditionally been structured closer to its predecessor, the KGB, than other post-Soviet states, however since reforms by Prime Minister Nikol Pashinyan in 2018, the service has reorganized and consolidated. Two services have been derived directly from the organization of the Russian Federal Security Service (FSB):

- Department of Intelligence
- Department of Counterintelligence
- Department of Military Counterintelligence
- Department of Protection of Constitutional Order and Fight against Terrorism – modeled on the 2nd Service of the Russian FSB
- Department of Economic Security and Countering Corruption – modeled on the 4th Service of the Russian FSB
- Investigation Department
- Territorial Authorities
- Border troops – under the control of the NSS since 2004 when it was transferred from the Ministry of Defence.
- Central Administration

== Recruitment ==
Service in the NSS is open to all Armenian citizens under the age of 30 who are fluent in Armenian. Males must have fulfilled or been exempted from compulsory service requirements. All applicants must meet military physical fitness requirements, and pass physical and mental health examinations as well as a polygraph. The service prefers recruits speak at least one other language, while recruits who attend training programs in Russia must also be fluent in Russian.

NSS intelligence officers are often trained through the intelligence schools of the Russian Federation, to include the Federal Security Service (FSB) academy. Students who attend the FSB academy graduate from the five year residential program with a degree in law and a commission as a lieutenant in the Armenian military.

Recruits to the Armenian Border Guard attend five year residential training programs in Russia at the Oryol campus of the FSB's Moscow Border Institute, or either the Kurgan or Kaliningrad Border Guard Institutes, graduating with a degree in engineering and a commission as a lieutenant in the Border Guard.

== NSS Union ==
In April 2021, group of former senior NSS officials formed an organization called the Union of NSS Reserve Officers. The union includes, in particular, ex-director of the NSS Artur Vanetsyan, former commander of the border troops Armen Abrahamyan, former Deputy Head of the NSS Grigory Harutyunyan, and former Acting Director of the NSS Mikael Hambardzumyan. The task of the union is to confront the challenges and threats to security, collect facts of the subversive activities of some structures, and use the experience of officers to solve the country's security problems. Although initially created as an apolitical structure, it supported the army officials who signed a statement drafted by General Staff calling for the resignation of Prime Minister Nikol Pashinyan.

== See also ==
- Prosecutor General of Armenia
