= Special forces of Armenia =

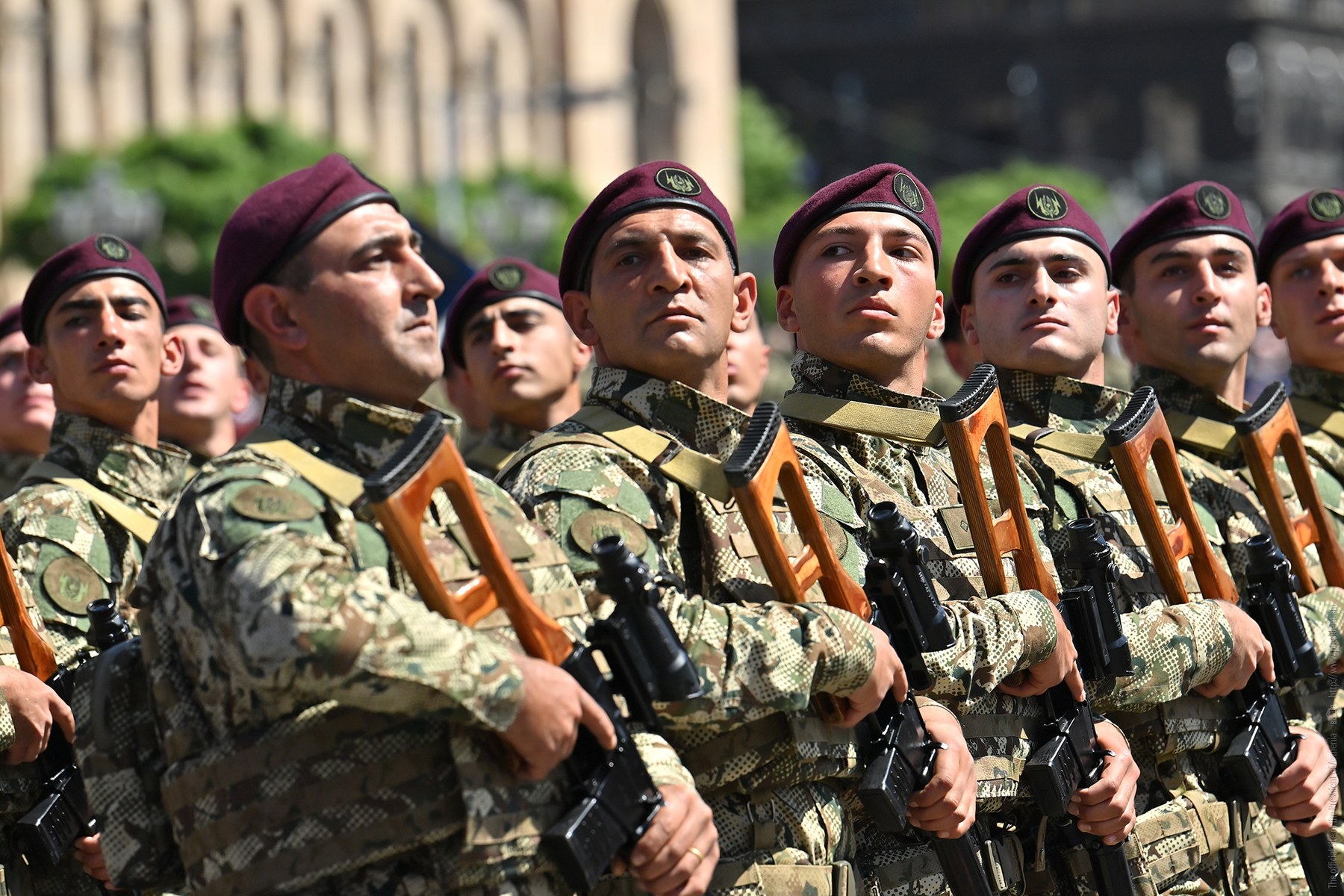
Members of Special Forces Command on parade in 2026.

The special operation forces of Armenia are the military and paramilitary units of Armenia that are charged with conducting special operations to protect the foreign and domestic interests of Armenia. The Although the exact definition of their role is unknown, like most other special forces worldwide, it includes counter-terrorism, reconnaissance, and unconventional warfare. These special operations forces operate under the jurisdiction of a few agencies and services, namely the Armenian Armed Forces, the National Security Service, the Special Investigative Service of Armenia, and the Police of Armenia. The special operations forces of the Armenian Army are sometimes called the Armenian Spetsnaz.

== Armed Forces ==
=== Special Forces Command ===
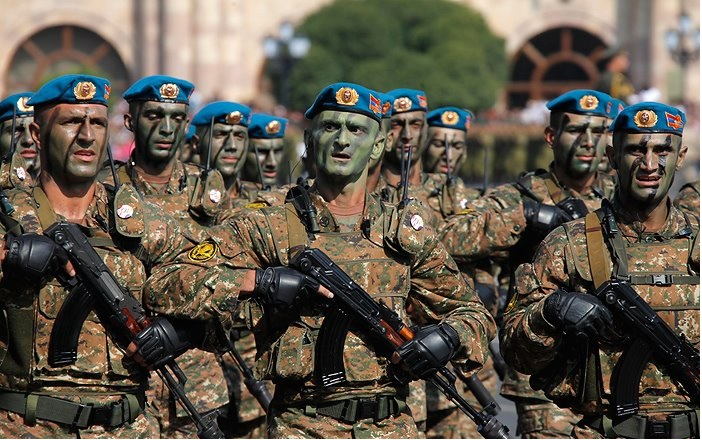
Airborne regiment soldiers during a parade in 2011

Special forces and special operations capable units of the military are under the command of the Armenian Army. Their assignments and missions are similar to that of the Spetsnaz GRU. They consist of a Special Forces Brigade, directly subordinated to Ground forces command, and five reconnaissance regiment, each one subordinated to one of the four army corps. Colonel Levon Davidyan currently serves as commander of special forces command.

=== 1st Special Forces Brigade ===
The 1st Special Forces Brigade (1-ին գնդակից հատուկ նպատակ - 1-in Gndakits’ Hatuk Npatak) was formed in 1992 and received its first military baptism that. The military unit was on permanent combat duty in the Ararat-Vayk border zone. Between 1992 and 1994, the military unit suffered 61 casualties. In 2007, for its 15th anniversary was awarded the "Battle Cross of the Second Degree". The Special Forces Regiment consists of the best-trained and the most battle hardened soldiers in the Armenian military. Its commander, inner organisation, and most of its operational history are unknown. The regiment uses the most advanced weaponry and technology available to the Armenian Armed Forces. Since its formation, the unit took part in two of the most complicated and well-noted military operations of modern Armenia, these being the securing of the Armenian pilot's remains and helicopter parts after the 2014 Armenian Mil Mi-24 shootdown and the rerouting of Azerbaijani forces from the village of Talysh and its surroundings during the 2016 Nagorno-Karabakh clashes. The reconnaissance regiment are under the command of their respective army corps. Their role include infiltration behind enemy lines, sabotage, support of frontline units in case of attacks Azerbaijani ground units, and much more. Not much is known about these units, except that they were involved in the 4 days war and are routinely used to rout attacking Azerbaijani sabotage units.

== National Security Service ==
The National Security Service has under its control regional special forces units, rapid-response units within the Armenian Border Guard, and Alpha Group.

Regional special forces units are under the command of the regional bureaus of the NSS. There is a unit in each Marz, and one in the Capital. They're mostly used as fast reaction forces in case of a major crime or a terrorist attack, but are also trained to conduct arrests of dangerous criminals. They gained nationwide respect and popularity after conducting the arrest of major crime figures linked to the pre-2018 Armenian revolution government during the second half of 2018.

The rapid-response units are the paramilitary arm of the Armenian Border Guard, having a wide range of missions similar to that of the US BORTAC.

The NSS Alpha Group is Armenia's elite counter-terrorism unit, formed after the 1999 Armenian parliament shooting, in order to be the main response of the Government of Armenia to domestic and foreign terrorism threats. Composed of the most experienced, well-trained and equipped operators in Armenia, Alpha Group has a reputation as the best special forces unit in the country. The first publicly acknowledged action of the group was during the 2016 Yerevan hostage crisis, where snipers were used to incapacitate some members of the Sasna Tsrer terrorist cell, without killing them, leading to their capture and to the group's surrender a few days later. It is also rumored to have taken part in the 2018 anti-corruption crackdown. Any other operation performed by the unit is unknown.

== Special Investigative Service of Armenia ==
The Special Investigative Service of Armenia maintains a small tactical unit in order to not be dependent on other agencies. Very little is known about the most recent member of the Armenian special operations community.

== Police of Armenia ==
The Police of Armenia maintains two types of special units that are extremely similar to the Russian OMON and SOBR in terms of role, training and weaponry. These units are the Patrol police and the special intervention unit of the Police of Armenia.

The Patrol police of Armenia is a multitask force used in some of the most dangerous situations. They conduct high-risk arrests and some tactical operations, but they've also been used multiple times to disperse crowds during large-scale protests, making them the best-known and least popular unit in Armenia's law enforcement apparatus. They wear a distinctive red beret along with an urban camouflage uniform. The 2016 Yerevan hostage crisis took place in the local base of the patrol police, as the hostage takers saw them as the "bulldogs" of the previous authoritarian governments.

The special intervention unit is a SWAT-type unit, being mostly used to deal with dangerous criminals. Not much is known about them.
