= Srbuhi Galyan =

Armenian politician and lawyer (born 1992)

- Սրբուհի Գալյան
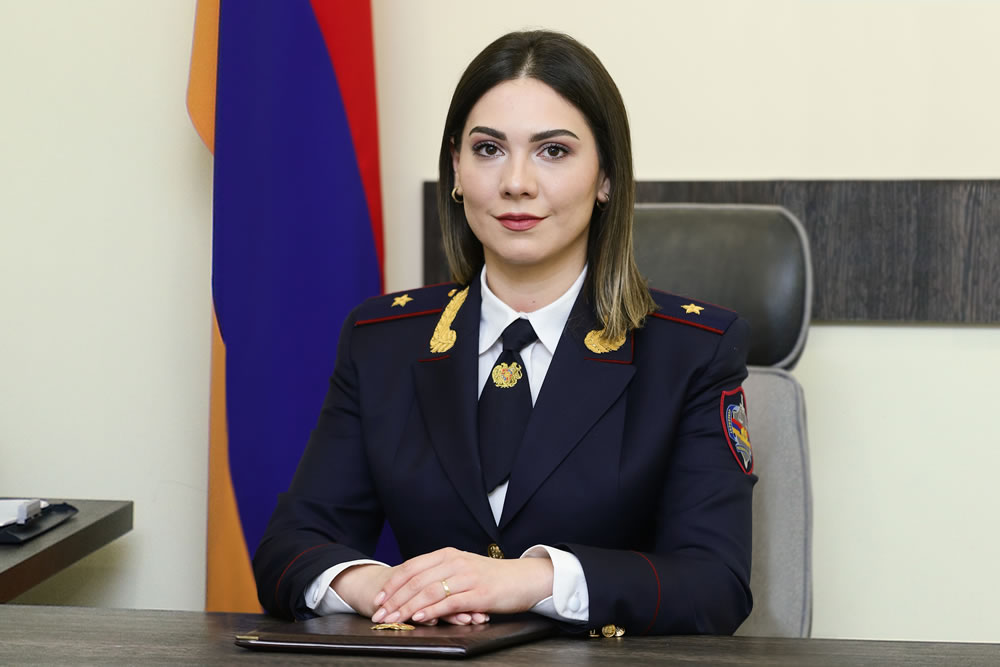
- Galyan in 2020

Minister of Justice
- Incumbent
- Assumed office 5 November 2024
- Prime Minister: Nikol Pashinyan
- Preceded by: Grigor Minasyan

Deputy Prosecutor General
- In office 2020–2024

Personal details
- Born: Srbuhi Hovhannes Galyan; 5 May 1992 (age 34) Yerevan, Armenia
- Education: Yerevan State University

Srbuhi Hovhannes Galyan (Armenian: Սրբուհի Հովհաննեսի Գալյան; born 5 May 1992) is an Armenian lawyer, academic and politician, Minister of Justice of Armenia since 2024. She previously served as Deputy Prosecutor General between 2020 and 2024.

== Early life ==
Galyan was born on 5 May 1992 in Yerevan, Armenia. She obtained a law degree from Yerevan State University in 2012, where she also obtained a master's degree in law in 2014 and a PhD in law in 2018. Between 2016 and 2017, Galyan studied at the Chamber of Advocates of the Republic of Armenia.

== Career ==
Between 2012 and 2015, she worked in the legal department of a telecommunications company, and between 2015 and 2018 as chief specialist in the department for organising, improving and developing investigation methods at the Special Investigative Service of Armenia and subsequently in its legal services ans external relations, between 2018 and 2019.

Since 2015, Galyan teaches criminal law at the Yerevan State University and since 2016 at the Justice Academy of Armenia. Between 2020 and 2021 she lectured at the Educational Complex of the Police.

In 2019 she was appointed Deputy Minister of Justice, an office she held until September 2020 when Galyan was named Deputy Prosecutor General, with the specific function of coordinating the confiscation of illicit assets.

On 5 November 2024 Galyan was appointed Minister of Justice by Prime Minister Nikol Pashinyan, succeeding Grigor Minasyan, who resigned on 1 October 2024. She was sworn in on 20 December 2024. The US State Department recognized her as a "pioneer in the fight against corruption" in December 2024. She said in March 2025 that Armenia future is in line with European values.

As Minister of Justice, Galyan is responsible for the planned potential constitutional reform, and in July 2025 she stated that the new constitution would be ready for 2026, before the parliamentary election. In an interview in August 2025, Galyan said that the reform would strengthen the role of the National Assembly in overseeing the government and its formation.

== Personal life ==
She speaks fluent English and Russian and has one daughter.
