= Karen Andreasyan =

Armenian judge

- Կարեն Անդրեասյան
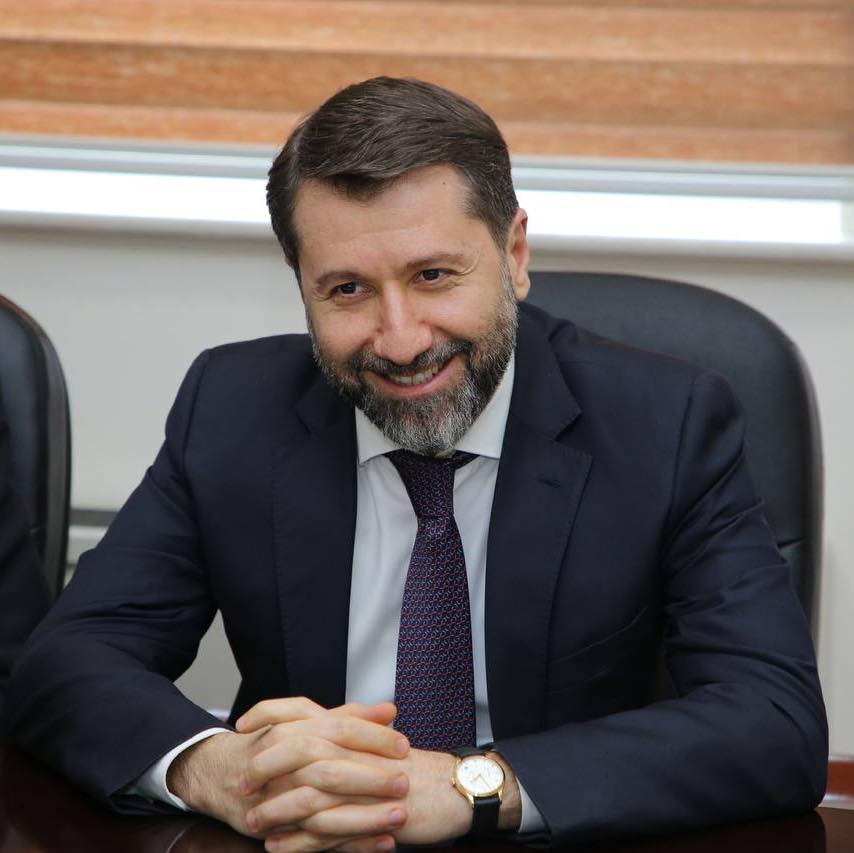
- Andreasyan in 2022

Minister of Justice of Armenia
- In office 3 August 2021 – 5 October 2022
- Prime Minister: Nikol Pashinyan
- Preceded by: Rustam Badasyan
- Succeeded by: Grigor Minasyan

President of the Supreme Judicial Council of Armenia
- In office 7 October 2022 – 17 November 2024
- Preceded by: Gagik Jhangiryan
- Succeeded by: Artur Atabekyan

Personal details
- Born: 10 September 1977 (age 48) Yerevan, Armenian SSR, Soviet Union
- Profession: Lawyer

Karen Aresi Andreasyan (Armenian: Կարեն Արեսի Անդրեասյան; born 10 September 1977) is an Armenian jurist and former politician who served as the Chairman of the Supreme Judicial Council of Armenia from October 2022 to November 2024. He served as the minister of justice from August 2021 to October 2022 in Nikol Pashinyan's government. From 2011 to 2016, he served as the Human Rights Defender (Ombudsman) of Armenia. He is also an associate professor of law at Yerevan State University and a member of the Chamber of Advocates of Armenia.

== Education ==
From 1994 to 2002 Karen Andreasyan studied in various institutions, including the Faculty of Law of Yerevan State University, obtaining a PhD in law, as well as at University of California, Berkeley, the University of Oxford, the Canadian Center for Human Rights, and the European Journalism Center in Maastricht, the Netherlands.

== Career ==
From 1997 to 2000 he worked in certain state bodies of Armenia, including the Yerevan City Council, the Ministry of Defense of Armenia, and the First Instance Court. He also taught human rights and administrative law at Secondary School N120 and the Armenian Police Academy.

From 2001 to 2007 he taught constitutional law, human rights and media law at the Faculty of Law of Yerevan State University.

From 2001 to 2003 he worked in a number of non-governmental organizations, including the Armenian Bar Association Center for pro bono legal services as a director, the "Civil Education Program" international organization as a project coordinator, and the NGO "Internews" as a lawyer. During this period he taught human rights in Abkhazia, South Ossetia and in seminars for journalists held in Nagorno-Karabakh.

In 2003, he was a senior research fellow at the Center for Socio-Legal Studies at University of Oxford in the UK.

From 2003 to 2004 he worked in a number of international organizations as an international expert and advisor, including "Article 19" in Great Britain, "Open Society Justice Initiative" in Hungary, and "Access to Information" in Bulgaria.

From 2005 to 2008 Andreasyan worked at the American Bar Association as a lawyer, then as a senior staff attorney and finally as a deputy director.

From 2006 to 2007 he served as an advisor to the president of the Constitutional Court of Armenia.

From 2008 to 2011 he founded and worked as a managing partner of "DEFENCE" Law Firm, which later merged with another company and renamed "AM" Law Firm. It is currently one of the leading firms in Armenia.

From 2007 to 2010 he conducted a number of television and civic projects. In cooperation with European Journalism Center, he organized a competition on Information Law and Investigative Journalism for law and journalism students. He hosted programs for the TV companies Yerkir Media and Armenia TV.

In 2011 Karen Andreasyan was elected by the National Assembly of Armenia as Human Rights Defender (ombudsman).

In 2022, he was elected the Chairman of the Supreme Judicial Council.

Karen Andreasyan created a reality TV show format called the "Journalistic Battles", where young journalists compete at a televised show, to investigate and report on most common corrupt practices in the country. This format created by him in Armenia was successfully replicated also in Kenya and Bolivia by the European Journalism Centre.

Karen Andreasyan is author of about twenty published academic articles, educational materials and other works.

Political offices
Preceded by Rustam Badasyan	Minister of Justice of Armenia; 2021–2022	Succeeded by Grigor Minasyan
