= Marat Aleksanian =

Armenian politician (1949–2020)

Minister of Justice of Armenia
- In office 1996–1998
- Preceded by: Vahe Stepanyan
- Succeeded by: David Harutyunyan

Personal details
- Born: August 3, 1949 Abovyan, Kotayk Province
- Died: April 19, 2020 (aged 70)
- Education: Yerevan State University

Marat Aleksanian (Armenian: Մարատ Ալեքսանյան; 3 August 1949 – 19 April 2020) was an Armenian politician and lawyer who served as Minister of Justice from 1996 to 1998. He graduated from Yerevan State University in 1971.

Aleksanian died on April 19, 2020, after a long illness.
