= Grigor Minasyan =

Armenian politician and lawyer

- Գրիգոր Մինասյան
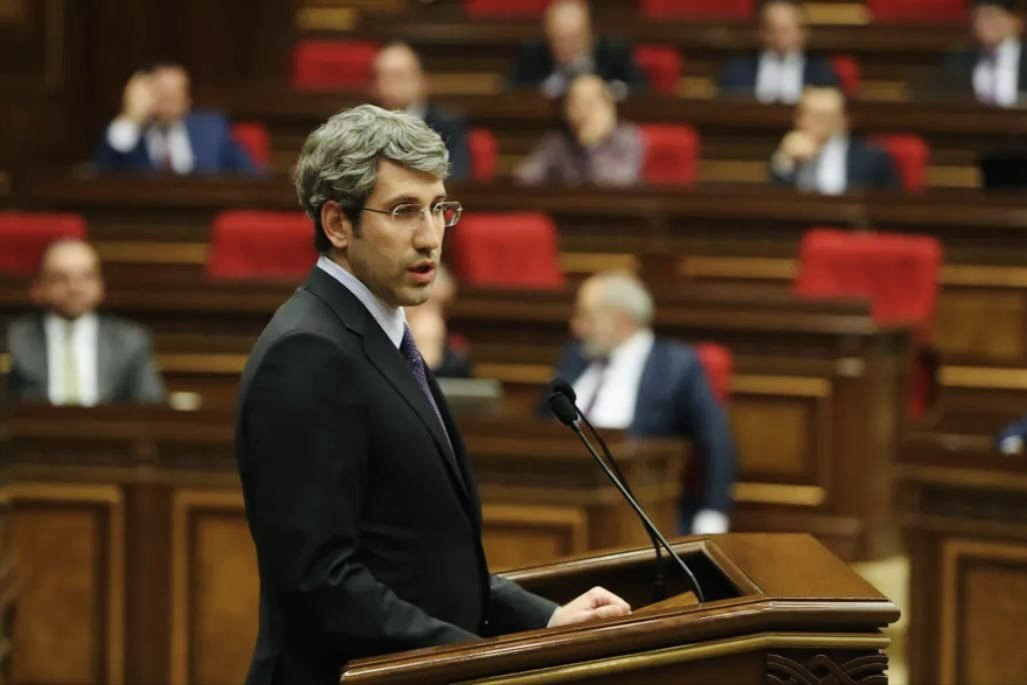

Minister of Justice
- In office 26 December 2022 – 5 November 2024
- Prime Minister: Nikol Pashinyan
- Preceded by: Karen Andreasyan
- Succeeded by: Srbuhi Galyan

Personal details
- Born: 23 December 1983 (age 42) Yerevan, Armenian SSR, Soviet Union

Grigor Arayi Minasyan (born 23 December 1983) is an Armenian politician who formerly served as Minister of Justice of Armenia. Formerly, he was the Managing Partner of AM Law Firm since 2012 and the Director of the Branch of the European Public Law Organization (EPLO) in Yerevan since 2014.

== Career ==
From 2003 to 2004 Minasyan was a lawyer at a private company.

From 2004 to 2009 he worked at the Law Institute of the Ministry of Justice of the Republic of Armenia, holding the positions of Assistant to the Director for Legal Affairs and later Deputy Director for Legal Affairs.

From 2008 to 2020 Minasyan was the editor-in-chief of the academic journal Justice.

From 2009 to 2010 he worked as a Head of the Department for Relations with the European Court of Human Rights under the Staff of the Ministry of Justice of the Republic of Armenia. At the same time, Minasyan worked as lecturer at the Law College of the Law Institute of the Ministry of Justice of the Republic of Armenia held the Chair of Law until 2011.

From 2011 to 2012 he held the position of Expert-Legal Consultant and then was reassigned to the position of Legal Consultant of the Director at the Law Institute of the Ministry of Justice of the Republic of Armenia.

In 2011, Minasyan became the Official Representative of the Republic of Armenia in the European Public Law Organization (EPLO) located in Athens.

In 2012, he became the Head of the Department of Legal Analysis at the Office of the Human Rights Defender of the Republic of Armenia.

Since 2012, Minasyan has been a member of the Chamber of Advocates of the Republic of Armenia.

In 2013 and in 2018, Minasyan was elected to Yerevan City Council.

From 2014 to 2022 was the director of the Yerevan branch of the European Public Law Organization (EPLO).

== Education ==
From 1990 to 2000, Minasyan studied at Secondary School #8 after A. Pushkin in Yerevan, From 2000 to 2005, he studied at the Faculty of Law of the Russian-Armenian University and graduated with honors. From 2005 to 2008, he studied at the Public Administration Academy of the Republic of Armenia.

In 2008 Minasyan successfully defended a dissertation and received a PhD degree.

== Personal life ==
Minasyan is married with three daughters.

Political offices
Preceded by Karen Andreasyan	Minister of Justice of Armenia; 2022–present	Incumbent
