= Vigen Malumian =

Armenian astrophysicist (1932–2013)

- Վիգեն Հայկի Մալումյան
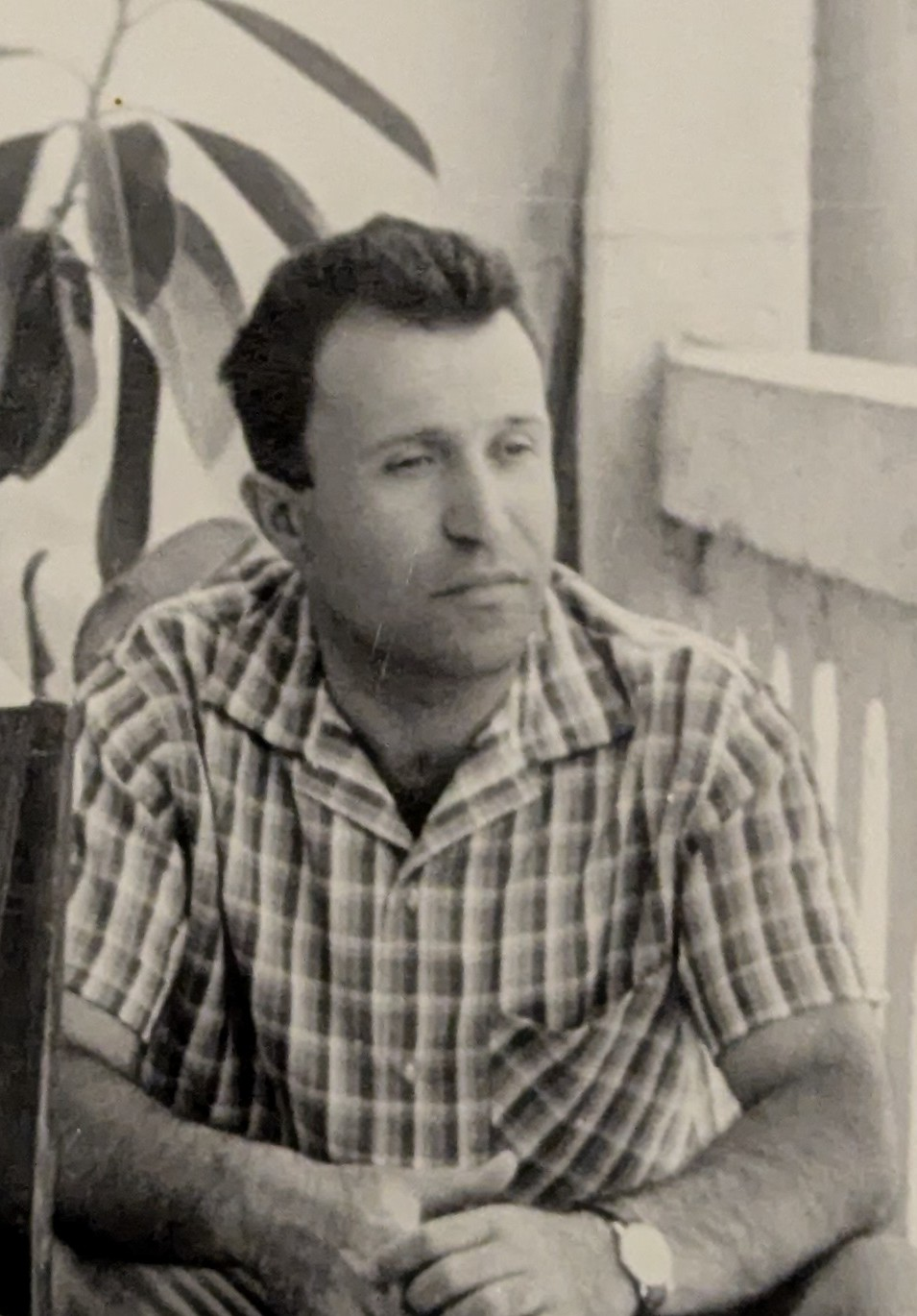
- Born: 11 March 1932; Yerevan, Armenia
- Died: 2 February 2013 (aged 80); Yerevan, Armenia
- Education: Faculty of Physics and Mathematics at Yerevan State University, Graduate School Yerevan State University
- Employer(s): Byurakan Astrophysical Observatory, Yerevan State University
- Relatives: Vram Malumian, brother (was the Director of the Kashira State Farm from 1968 to 1992)

Vigen Malumian (Armenian: Վիգեն Հայկի Մալումյան) (Russian: Виген Гайкович Малумян) (11 March 1932 – 2 February 2013) was an Armenian astrophysicist who specialised in radio galaxies and the radio characteristics of spiral galaxies. He was a prominent scientist at the Byurakan Observatory in Armenia (BAO), a professor at the Faculty of Physics at Yerevan State University, and a member of the BAO Scientific Board. Additionally, he was involved in the scientific council responsible for awarding degrees at the Observatory. Malumian was also a member of several international scientific organizations, including the International Astronomical Union (IAU), the European Astronomical Society (EAS), and the Armenian Astronomical Society (ArAS).

== Life and career ==
Malumian graduated in 1954 from the Faculty of Physics and Mathematics at Yerevan State University in Armenia. He began working at the Byurakan Astrophysical Observatory shortly thereafter. From 1955 to 1959, he studied in graduate school and defended his candidate dissertation at Yerevan State University in 1963. His dissertation, titled Results of Observations of Certain Galactic Radio Sources at 33 cm Using High-Resolution Radio Telescopes, was supervised by the renowned radio astronomer Semyon Emanuelovich Khaykin.

In 1991, Malumian was awarded a Doctorate of Physical and Mathematical Sciences at the Byurakan Astrophysical Observatory, following his research on Radio Emission from Moderately Active and Weak Radio Galaxies. His work focused on isolated and interacting galaxies, galaxy groups, radio galaxies, quasars, and other radio sources in multiple wavelength domains. Malumian authored more than 90 scientific papers, many of which were widely cited in international scientific literature. He presented his research at numerous international scientific conferences.

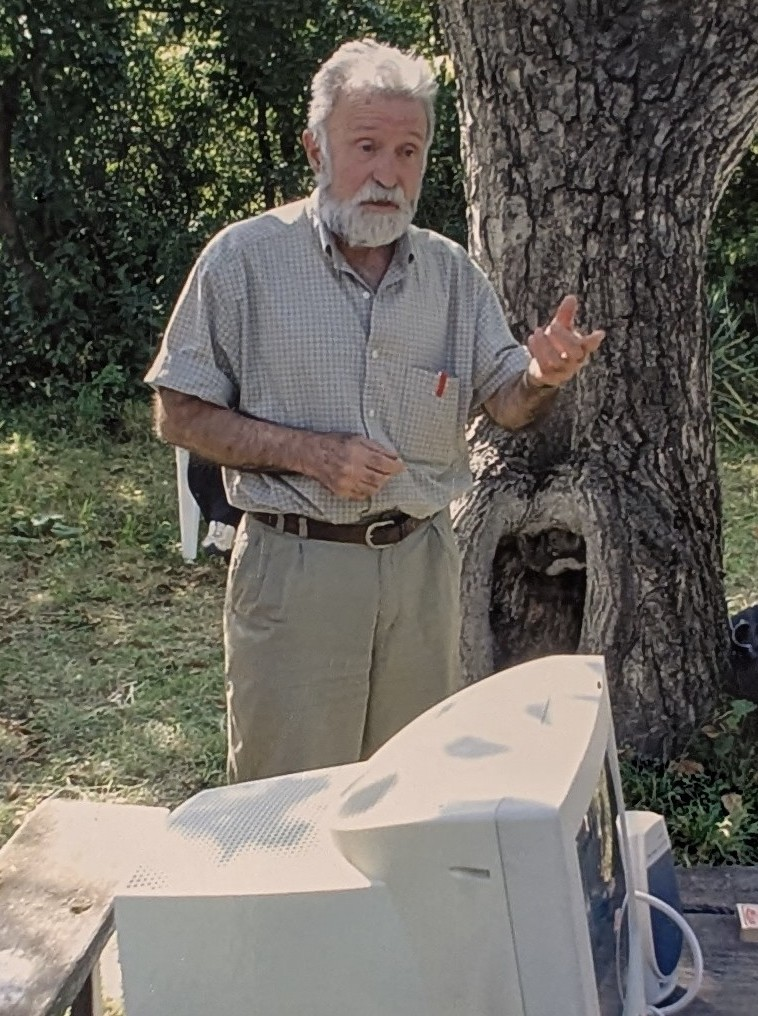
Vigen Malumian at a summit

Malumian was also active within the IAU, where he participated in IAU Symposium 194. He held memberships in various IAU divisions, including Division B Facilities, Technologies, and Data Science, Commission 40 Radio Astronomy (until 2013), and Division X Radio Astronomy (until 2012).

Malumian died in Yerevan on 2 February 2013, at the age of 80.

== Works ==
GPS and CSS radio sources

Relationship Between Infrared and Radio Emission of Spiral Galaxies

Activity Phenomena Observed at Radio Frequences in Spiral Galaxies

Radio luminosity of spiral galaxies

Relationship between radio luminosity and optical surface brightness of spiral galaxies

Radio Emission Spectra of Isolated Spiral Galaxies and Spiral Members of Pairs of Galaxies

On the question of radio emission of spiral galaxies in groups of galaxies

On the Radio Emission of Spiral Galaxies in Double System of Galaxies

Radio Spectrum and Surface Brightness of Radio Galaxies

Observations of faint radio galaxies with the RATAN-600 radio telescope

Radio luminosities and structure of central regions of spiral galaxies

Radio emission of elliptical and lenticular galaxies in groups of galaxies

On Enhanced Radio Emission of Spiral Components of Double Galaxies and of Groups of Galaxies

RATAN-600 Observations of Faint Bologna Radio Galaxies at 7.6-CM and 3.9-CM

Radio Emission of Spiral Galaxies in Groups of Galaxies

On the Radio Emission from Interacting Spiral Galaxies

Radio emission of isolated single and double galaxies

RATAN-600 Observations of another 15 Bologna Radio Galaxies

Colors and the Byurakan classification of galaxies

RATAN-600 Observations of 15 Bologna Radio Galaxies

Investigation of galaxies of high surface brightness at 3.95 GHz

Radio Spectra and the Byurakan Classification of Galaxies

On the variability of the radio emission of Markarian 421

Observations of Galaxies of High Surface Brightness at 3.66-GHZ - Part One

Optical Surface Brightnesses and Radio Luminosities of Galaxies

Observations of Galaxies of High Surface Brightness with the Radio Telescope RATAN-600

The break in the radio emission spectrum of Cassiopeia A

Radio emission of the galactic nucleus

The Radio Spectrum of the Galactic Nucleus

Observations of Galactic Plane Near delta = -24deg23' at Wavelength 32.5 cm with High Resolving Power

Results of observations of Omega (NGC 6618) nebula made with the large Pulkovo radio telescope at wavelength 32.5 cm

The Results of the Observations of Radio Source Sagittarius-A at 32.5 cm Wavelength with High Resolution Power

Observation of the Region near the Galactic Center on a Wavelength of 33.3 cm with the Large GAO Radio Telescope
