= Yerevan State University =

Public university in Armenia

- Երևանի պետական համալսարան
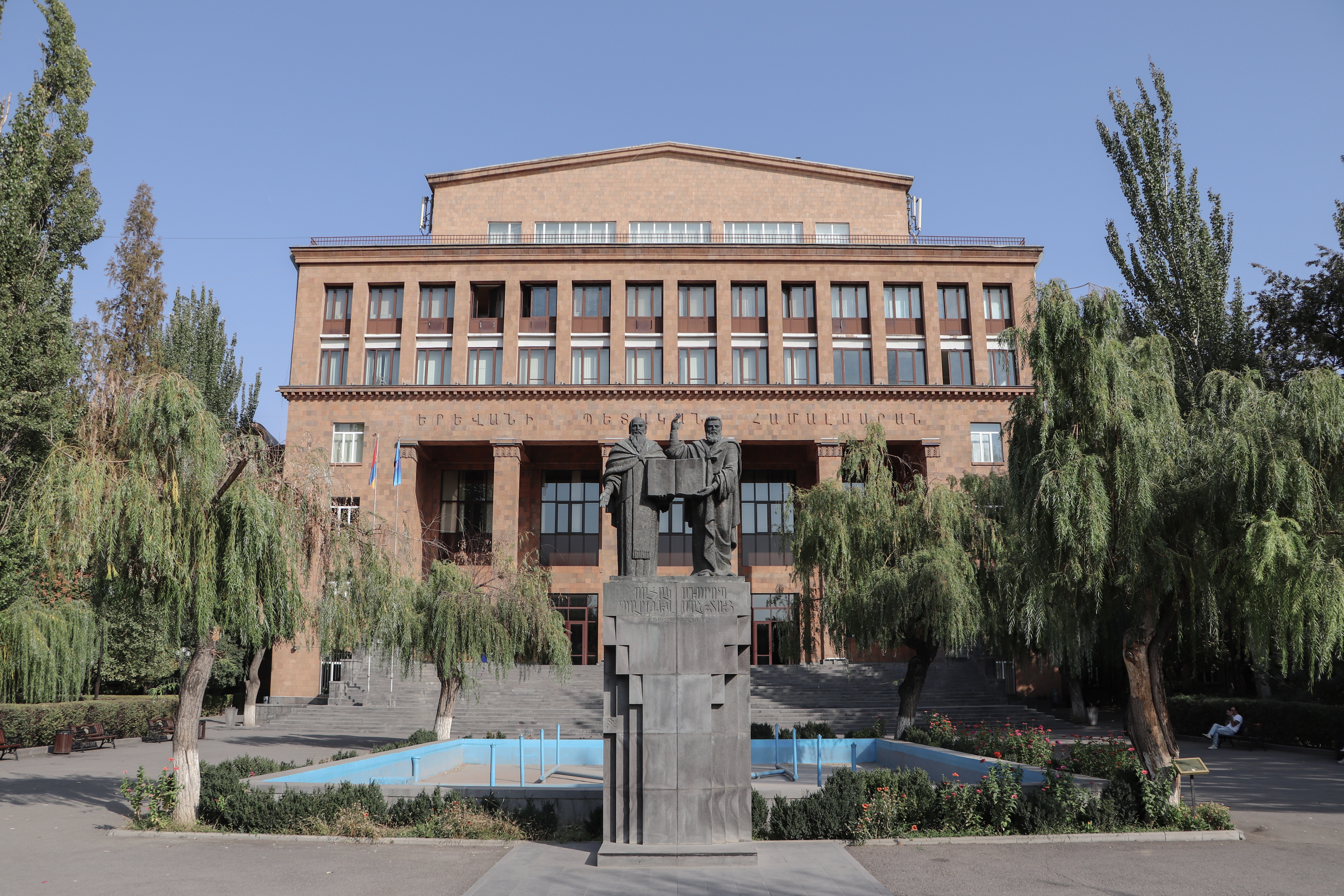
- Yerevan State University
- Type: Public
- Established: May 16, 1919; 107 years ago
- Rector: Hovhannes Hovhannisyan
- Academic staff: 2,370
- Students: 13,815
- Postgraduates: 2,000
- Location: Yerevan, Armenia; 40°10′54″N 44°31′35″E
- Campus: Urban
- Colours: Blue, White
- Website: Official website

University rankings

Regional – Overall
- QS Emerging Europe and Central Asia: 173 (2022)

Yerevan State University (YSU; Armenian: Երևանի պետական համալսարան, ԵՊՀ, Yerevani petakan hamalsaran), also simply University of Yerevan, is the oldest continuously operating public university in Armenia. Founded in 1919, it is the largest university in the country. It is thus informally known as Armenia's "mother university" (Մայր բուհ, Mayr buh). Of its 3,150 employees, 1,190 comprise the teaching staff, which includes 25 academicians, 130 professors, 700 docents (associate professors), and 360 assistant lecturers. The university has 400 researchers, 1,350 post-graduate students, and 8,500 undergraduates, including 300 students from abroad.

Instruction is in Armenian, but instruction in Russian or English for foreign students is available as needed. The academic year is from September 1 through June 30.

According to University Ranking by Academic Performance (URAP), it was the top-ranked university in Armenia and the 954th in the world in 2010, of 20,000 institutions included in the list. Yerevan State University was listed among the 1,000 best universities of the world according to the QS World University Ranking 2022.

YSU is a full member of the International Association of Universities, European University Association (EUA), the Association of Eurasian Universities, the Russian Union of Rectors, the Association of Universities of the Countries of the Black Sea Region, and the International Association of Presidents of Universities.

== History ==
=== Foundation ===
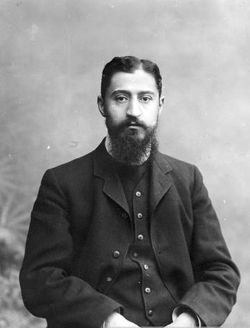
Sirakan Tigranyan, one of the founders of the university

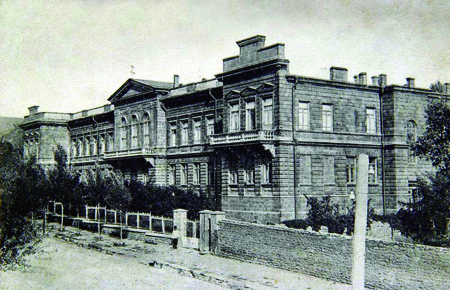
First YSU building in Yerevan

Yerevan State University was established on May 16, 1919, by decision of the government of the Republic of Armenia and the efforts of politician Sirakan Tigranyan. Professor Yuri Ghambaryan was appointed as its first rector (1919–20).

The university was officially inaugurated on January 31, 1920, in a grand ceremony held in Alexandropol (modern Gyumri), with the participation of Prime Minister Alexander Khatisian and many other government officials, as well as the ambassadors of Great Britain, France, and Iran to Armenia. At first, the university was temporarily housed within the school of commerce building in Alexandropol (current building of the Gyumri Technology Center). The first lecture took place on February 1, 1920, conducted by academician Stepan Malkhasyants.

During its first academic year, the university had a single faculty of history and linguistics, with 32 academic staff and 262 students. Historian Hakob Manandyan, linguist Manuk Abeghian, historian Ashkharbek Kalantar, and Stepan Malkhasyants were among the first lecturers of the university. Later during the same year, the university was relocated to Yerevan and housed within the former Yerevan teachers' seminary building built between in the early 1900s on Astafyan Street (designed by architect Vasily Mirzoyan, currently home to the Faculty of Theology, Faculty of History, and Faculty of Economics and Management).

=== During the Soviet period ===
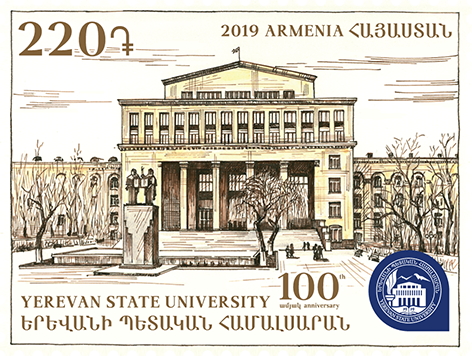
The 2019 stamp of Armenia dedicated to the 100th anniversary of the university

After the Sovietization of Armenia in December 1920, the university was renamed the "People's University of Yerevan." Hakob Manandyan was appointed new rector of the university.

In 1921, the university became home to two faculties: the faculty of physical sciences and the faculty of social sciences. In October 1921, three more faculties were opened: the faculty of oriental studies, the faculty of agriculture, and the faculty of technical studies. In March 1922, the faculties of medicine and pedagogy were opened, followed by the faculty of labor in 1923.

On October 20, 1923, the university was renamed the "State University of Armenian Soviet Socialist Republic", becoming the "mother university" of Soviet Armenia within the Transcaucasian Socialist Federative Soviet Republic.

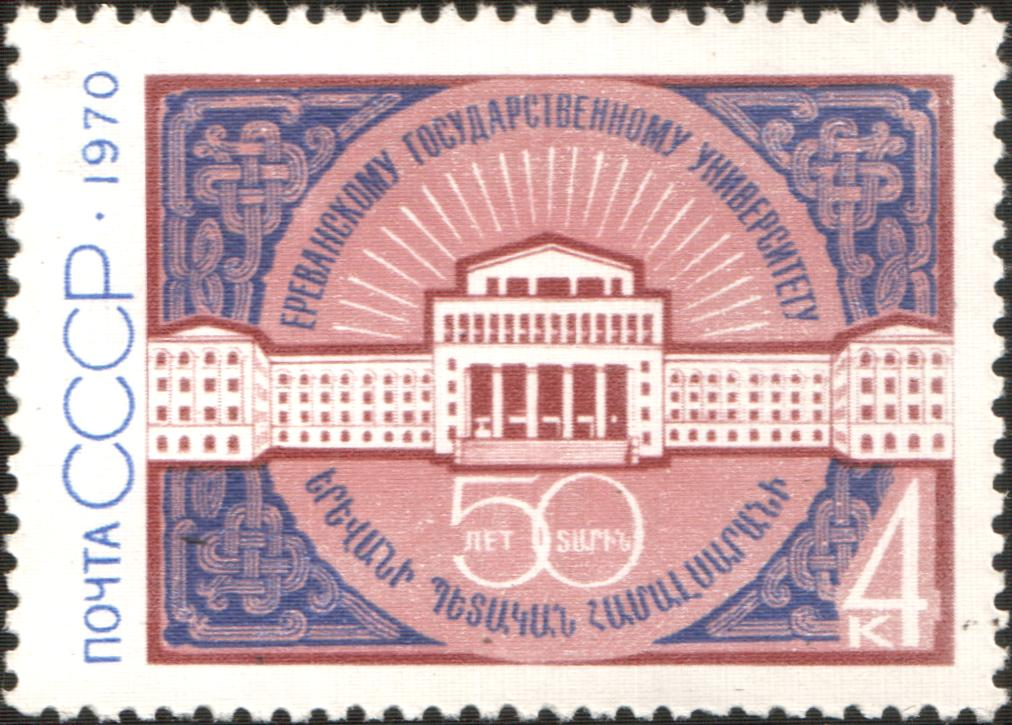
The 1970 Soviet stamp dedicated to the 50th anniversary of the university. During the Soviet days, the establishment year of the university was considered to be 1920 instead of 1919

In 1930, the university was restructured and many faculties were separated from the university to form an independent entity, including:

- Armenian Construction Institute from the faculty of technical studies,
- Yerevan State Medical University from the faculty of medicine,
- Armenian State Pedagogical University from the faculty of pedagogy, Cooperative Institutes were established in Yerevan on the base of the faculties of YSU.

During the same year, the Armenian Agrarian University was also founded on the basis of the faculty of agriculture.

By 1935–36, the university was home to eight faculties: history, linguistics, law, geology, geography, chemistry, biology, and physics-mathematics. In 1959, physics and mathematics were separated into two faculties.

During the Stalinization period, the university was named after Vyacheslav Molotov. However, during the de-Stalinization period, the university was renamed once again to "Yerevan State University".

The construction of the new headquarters of the university was completed during the 1950s, between Mravyan (now Alex Manoogian) and Charents streets, to the northeast of the Circular Park. The building was designed by architect Edmond Tigranyan.

Between 1960 and 1990, many new faculties were founded, modern laboratories were opened, and the center of Armenology was established. In 1991, there were 17 faculties in the university.

Yerevan State University has been awarded with the Order of the Red Banner of Labour.

=== Post-independence ===
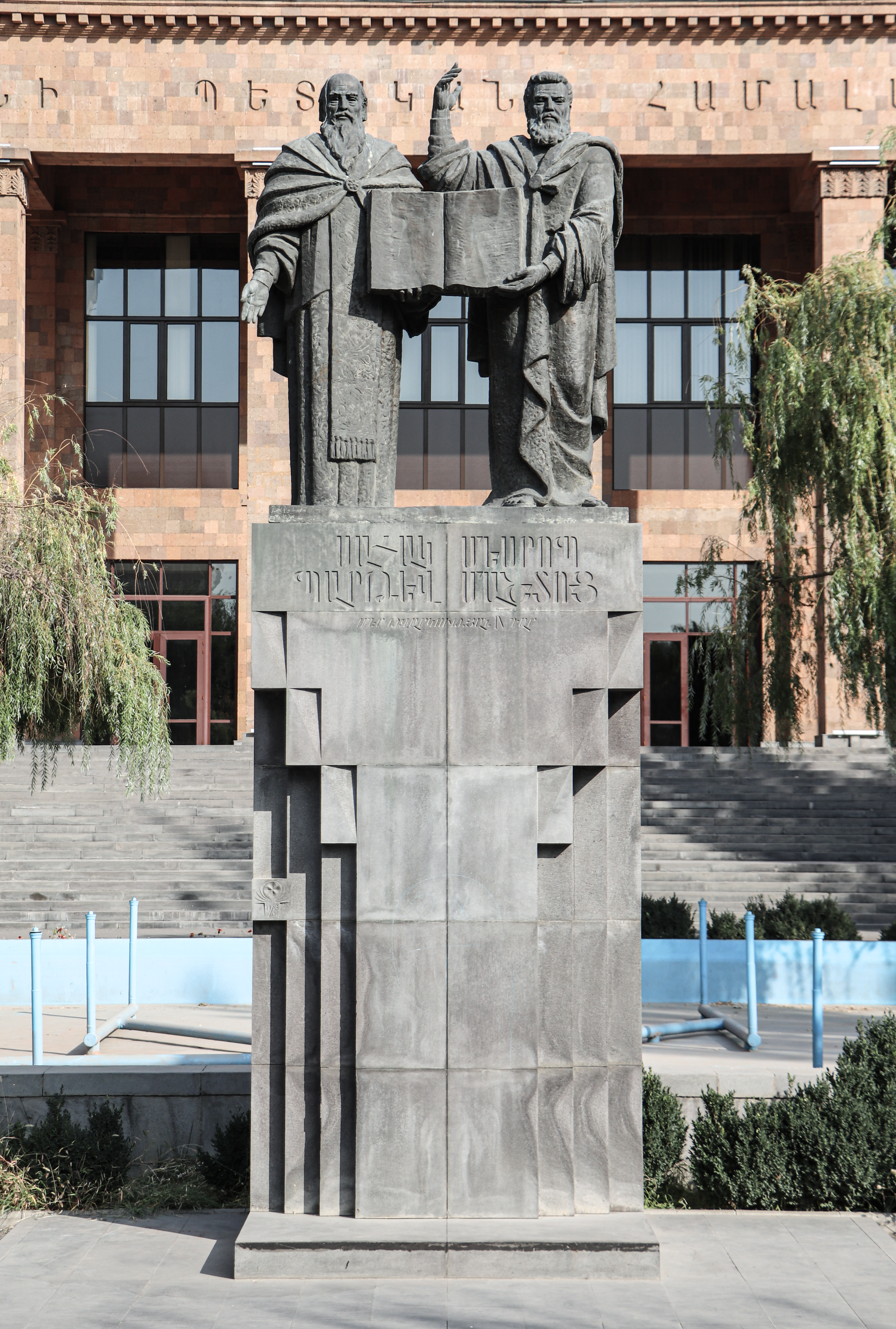
The statues of Mesrop Mashtots and Sahak Partev by sculptor Ara Sargsyan, erected in 2002, at the entrance to the YSU main building

After Armenia gained its independence, the Ijevan campus of Yerevan State University was opened in 1994.

The period of 1995–96 was crucial for the university with the beginning of a new educational process in order to meet the highest international standards. Thus, the faculties adopted a two-grade system of education, providing Bachelor's and master's degrees. Doctoral degrees are also issued by the faculties.

As of 2016–17, around 20,000 students study at 19 faculties of the university. The academic staff of the university consists of more than 1600 qualified specialists and experts, including 207 professors, 581 associate professors, 375 assistants, and 453 lecturers.

Doctor of Historical Sciences Hovhannes Hovhannisyan has been the rector of university since 2021.

On November 27, 2014, the Yerevan State University was restructured as a foundation by government decision. The first meeting of the new governing body of the university, the 32-member Board of Trustees, was held on April 19, 2015. President of Armenia Serzh Sargsyan was elected as chairman of the board. The current chairman of the board of trustees is Minister of Defense Suren Papikyan.

== Governance ==
=== Board of trustees ===
The Yerevan State University Board of Trustees is the collegial governing body composed of 32 members, summoned for five years.

In general, the board is in charge of approving the working procedures and the regulations of the rector elections, making decisions on early termination of powers, evaluating the rector's annual report, approval of the annual and strategic plans, approval of and amendments to the YSU charter, structure, budget, staff list, etc.

The board members are representatives of the following bodies:

- professorial staff (25%),
- students and PhD students (25%),
- representatives of scientific, educational, cultural, and economic fields (25%),
- employees who cooperate with the university (25%).

=== Rector ===
The Yerevan State University Rector is the executive director of the university. Based on the university charter, the rector is the supreme ruling director of the university foundation, as well as the person responsible for the results of all activities of the university. The YSU rector is elected for a term of five years by secret ballot.

Managing and controlling the university's academic, scientific, economic, financial, national, and international activities are within the range of the rector's responsibilities. The rector is also the chairperson of the YSU Academic Council.

=== Academic Council ===
The Academic Council of Yerevan State University is responsible for planning and managing the educational, methodological, and scientific issues of the university for a 5-year cycle. The activities of the council are fulfilled through both regular and extraordinary sessions. Regular sessions are held at least eight times a year. In contrast, extraordinary sessions are called for upon necessity, at the written request of the chairman of the Academic Council, or at least 1/3rd of the council members.

The Academic Council verifies the regulations regarding graduation qualification conditions, postgraduate admission terms, making decisions on reorganizing and annulling faculties, scientific and research institutions, centers, colleges, high schools, as well as departments and other structural subdivisions. The council is also in charge of awarding honorary titles, medals, rewards, individual scholarships, as well as nominating candidacies for state and international awards and titles.

The Academic Council consists of 88 members, of which 50% are elected. The YSU Rector is the chairperson of the Academic Council, while the vice-rectors are the heads of corresponding subdivisions. It is noteworthy that 25% of the members of the council are students.

=== Rectorate ===
The YSU Rectorate is the advisory body to the university rector. It is composed of the rector, vice-rectors, scientific secretary, head of the educational administration, chief accountant, president of trade union, heads of YSU branches, scientific institutes, directors of centres, and deans of the YSU faculties.

== Faculties ==
As of 2016, the university has 19 faculties in Yerevan, as well as a "Preparatory department for foreign citizens":

=== Faculty of Physics ===
- Physics
- Nuclear Physics (Physics of Nuclear Reactors)
- Applied Mathematics and Physics

The process of training specialists in the field of physics and mathematics began in 1922 in YSU. The establishment of an independent faculty of Physics and Mathematics, with separate Chairs of Physics and Mathematics in 1933, was a significant step towards developing the study of physics in Armenia.

To strengthen the development of physics, and in order to generate more specialists in the country, the Faculty of Physics was separated from the Mathematics-Physics Faculty in 1959. The first dean of the Faculty was NAS RA Academician Norayr Kocharyan.

The Faculty staff is composed of highly qualified specialists. Currently, NAS RA has three Academicians, five Associate members, 36 Doctors of Sciences, and more than 80 Candidates of Sciences, all involved in the tutoring process of this Faculty.

Since the 2006–2007 academic year, the Faculty has been offering the specialization of Pedagogue of Physics (distance learning).

Scientific research activities, which are conducted at the laboratories of the Faculty, correspond to the present demands of the field both scientifically and technically.

There is also a computer room with modern technology, which enables students to get acquainted with modern scientific experiments and automated systems of technology management.

The Faculty is active in scientific development, as evidenced by the receipt of various international grants and the many ongoing projects financed by the state budget. Currently, scientific research activities are undertaken within the framework of 13 international grants (with total financing of US$1.5 million) and 15 projects on budgetary financing.

=== Faculty of Mathematics and Mechanics ===
- Mathematics
- Actuarial Mathematics
- Mechanics

The training of specialists in the area of mathematics at YSU began in 1924 at the Department of Physics and Mathematics of the Faculty of Social Sciences. In 1933 this department was transformed into the Physics-Mathematics Faculty. In 1959 the faculty was divided into two independent faculties: Mathematics and Mechanics, and Physics. In 1963, a specialization in Mathematical Cybernetics began to be offered at the Faculty of Mechanics and Mathematics. The latter served as a basis for the foundation of the Faculty of Informatics and Applied Mathematics in 1972.

In 1988, the Faculty of Mathematics and Mechanics was divided into two faculties: Mechanics, and Mathematics. In 2007, those were again unified into one faculty of Mathematics and Mechanics.

Currently, four Academicians, four NAS RA associate members, 17 doctors of sciences, and 45 candidates of physico-mathematical sciences are involved in the tutoring process at this faculty. The faculty provides training in three specializations: mathematics, mechanics, and actuarial mathematics. Three different degrees are awarded: Bachelor's, Master of Arts, and postgraduate studies.

The faculty trains highly qualified specialists for different areas of modern mathematics. The faculty's graduates receive a bachelor's degree in mathematics, a master's degree in mathematics, or a qualification as teacher of mathematics. Graduates are employed in different scientific research institutes, secondary schools, and IHE.

The faculty management focuses on the development of different branches of mathematics which are currently in demand. The launch of the specialization in Actuarial Mathematics was a significant step toward progress in this area. These specialists combine the specializations of mathematician, financial specialist, sociologist, and investment manager.

A reading hall, which provides access to the literature corresponding to the educational program, is at the students' disposal. An electronic library and Internet access are available, too.

The faculty has fostered active scientific cooperation with several famous mathematical centers, IHE, and scientific research centers all over the world, such as the NAS Republic of Armenia Institute of Mathematics, Moscow State University, NAN RF Steklov Institute of Mathematics, University of Trier (Germany), Stockholm Royal Technological University (Sweden), TTU (Finland) and University of Applied Sciences in Schmalkalden in Germany.

=== Faculty of Radiophysics ===
- Radiophysics and Electronics
- Physics of Semiconductors and Microelectronics
- Telecommunications and Signals Development

The Faculty was founded in June, 1975 on the basis of the Faculty of Physics. This faculty aims to provide students with deep knowledge in Theoretical Physics and strong engineering skills.

In 1975, four chairs of this faculty trained 371 students; by the mid-1980s, the total number of students reached 650. During the 31 years of its existence, the faculty has trained more than 2,500 specialists. 200 of them have different scientific degrees. Most of them have become scientists, production managers, and state officials. Many of them are still involved in the academic process of the faculty.

Currently, there are four chairs at this faculty: Ultra High-Frequency Radiophysics and Telecommunications, Physics of Semiconductors and Microelectronics, Wave Process Theory and Physics, and Higher Mathematics, as well as the Scientific Research Center of Semiconductor Devices and Nanotechnologies. Three specializations are available at this faculty: radiophysics and electronics, physics of semiconductors and microelectronics, and telecommunications and signal research.

A specialization in Synopsis is also available at this faculty, which trains specialists in the area of design of ultra-high integral schemes. 420 students, both bachelor's and master's candidates, are currently trained at the faculty. Two academicians, 15 doctors and professors, and 33 candidates of sciences contribute to the educational process at this faculty.

=== Faculty of Informatics and Applied Mathematics ===
- Informatics and Applied Mathematics

The Faculty of Informatics and Applied Mathematics (IAM) of Yerevan State University is an educational and scientific center preparing fundamental research scientists and qualified programmers.

The Faculty was founded in 1971 (initially called the Faculty of Applied Mathematics) based on the Chair of Computing Mathematics, which was established at the Faculty of Physics and Mathematics in 1957. A decisive role in the Faculty's establishment, was played by such scientists as: A.A. Lyapunov, S.N. Mergelyan, Yu.I. Zhuravlev. S.N. Mergelyan (also the first Head of the Chair of Numerical Analysis – one of the three chairs of the newly founded Faculty). These scientists defined the roadmap of the faculty's scientific research and prepared human resources necessary for the Faculty.

At present, the Faculty of IAM consists of three chairs: the Chair of Programming and Information Technologies, the Chair of Discrete Mathematics and Theoretical Computer Science, and the Chair of Numerical Analysis and Mathematical Modelling. The Staff of the Faculty includes more than 10 Doctors of Sciences, and around 50 of the employees are Candidates of Science. Many of them are well-known not only in Armenia but also abroad. The Faculty prepares Bachelors specializing in "Informatics and Applied Mathematics" (both full- and part-time). All three Chairs of the Faculty provide courses for this purpose. The Faculty provides a master's degree in four different programs. Three of them are carried out by the Faculty Chairs, and one is implemented in collaboration with the company SYNOPSYS. The study plan for the students of the Faculty provides fundamental mathematical training and a wide spectrum of courses related to computers and programming; a significant portion of study consists of practical work using computers.

Since its establishment the Faculty of IAM has been collaborating productively with the Yerevan Research Institute of Mathematical Machines and the Institute for Informatics and Automation Problems of NAS of Armenia (formerly the Computing Center of Academy of Sciences of Armenian SSR), being the main provider of highly qualified specialists for these organizations. The Faculty has close scientific contacts with leading educational and scientific centers of Russia, such as Moscow State University, Dorodnicyn Computing Center, and Steklov Mathematical Institute of the Russian Academy of Sciences. Employees and post-graduate students of the Faculty defend their dissertations in Armenia and also at the above-mentioned centers in Russia. The Faculty also has scientific contacts with Trier University in Germany.

Graduates work in various countries in fields where computers are used, such as academic and research institutes, universities, state and government organizations, banks, and private IT companies.

=== Faculty of Chemistry ===
- Chemistry
- Applied Chemistry
- Ecological Chemistry
- Pharmaceutical Chemistry

Chemistry tutoring was launched at the university in 1921. It was made possible by the newly opened Chair of Chemistry, consisting of S. Ghambaryan, A. Hakobyan, L. Rotinyan and H. Akunyan. The Dean of the faculty, specialist of agro-chemistry P. Kalantaryan, and then-Rector and specialist of biochemistry H. Hovhannisyan also made a significant contribution in this area.

The joint Chemistry department was managed by Professor S. Ghambaryan for many years. The department became famous for its research in the field of organic chemistry, where the main area of research was the reaction of superoxide amines, research of which is still continuing. Other research by the department includes the production of ether oils by plants.

In 1927, the joint chair was divided into two chairs – those of Organic and Physical Chemistry. The Faculty of Chemistry was formed as a separate faculty in 1933. Professor Grigory Ter-Ghazaryan became the faculty Dean in 1934. Since 1933, a new specialization has been offered by the Faculty – that of Chemistry and Environmental Protection; and since 1994, a specialization in Pharmaceutics.

The Faculty determines criteria for school educational projects related to chemistry.

This faculty is an internationally recognized scientific center. The faculty has established strong relations with leading foreign scientific centers:

- USA: Northwestern University (Evanston), University of Arizona (Tyson), University of California (Davis)
- Germany: Rostock, University of Münster, Karlsruhe, Regensburg, Bochum universities
- England: University of London, Birkbeck College, Italy-University of Bologna
- France: Paris-Sud University, University of Montpellier, Agrarian Institute of France
- Poland: Silesian University (Katowice), Maria Curie-Skłodowska University (Lublin)
- Russia: Moscow State University, RF Institute of Elementary Organic Chemistry (Moscow), Institute of Organic Chemistry, Institute of Chemical Physics, Institute of Structural Macrokinetics, Institute of Human Brain (Saint-Petersburg).

=== Faculty of Biology ===
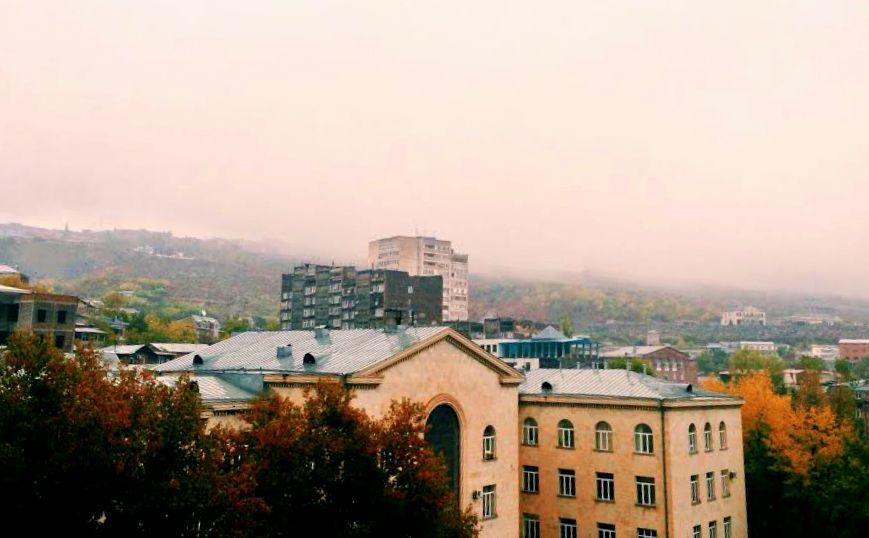
Faculty of Biology

- Biology
- Biophysics
- Biochemistry

The Faculty of Biology was founded in 1933, but the process of its founding started shortly after the foundation of YSU itself. Over different periods of time, it existed as an Academic Division of the Faculty of Natural Sciences and the Faculty of Pedagogy under the following names: Sub-department of Biology, Department of Biology, and Cycle of Biology.

Currently, the faculty is structured as eight chairs: Botany, Zoology, Human and Animal Physiology, Ecology and Nature Protection, Microbiology and Biotechnology of Plants and Microbes, Genetics and Cytology, and Biochemistry and Biophysics. Scientific research groups are active under each of these chairs, utilizing five scientific research laboratories: General Biology, Biochemistry of Nitrogen Compounds, Biology and Biotechnology of Fungi, Biophysics of Subcellular Structures and a joint laboratory with YSU Faculty of Physics on Structural Biophysics. At the same time, state-financed scientific research groups undertake their activities under different chairs. This faculty is one of the largest high-ranked scientific research centers at YSU. More than 100 researchers are involved in the scientific research activities of the Faculty.

Currently, 3 NAS Republic of Armenia Academicians, 3 NAS Republic of Armenia Associate members, 22 Doctors of Sciences and more than 100 candidates are involved in teaching for the Faculty. The general direction of research of the faculty are in the areas of Molecular and Cellular Biology, Molecular Biophysics, Biophysics of Membranes, Comparative and Evolutionary Biochemistry, Biochemistry of Plants, Biology and Fungi Research, Bacteriology, Biotechnology of Microbes and Plants, Molecular Genetics and Cell Genetics of Man, Genetic Engineering, Zoology and Histology, Physiology of Higher Nervous Activity of Humans and Animals, Psychophysiology, and Ecology of Biocenosis and Nature Protection. Many of the graduates are now well-known scientists working in scientific centers of the former USSR as well as abroad in the US, France, Great Britain, Germany, Italy, and Japan.

More than 500 students study at the faculty and about 40 students do so through distance learning. More than 30 students are currently working to obtain the degree of a Candidate (Ph.D. and applicants). Three degrees are offered: Bachelor's, Master of Science, and Doctorate.

"GeneClub" acts at the Chair of Genetics and Cytology.

=== Faculty of Geography and Geology ===
- Geology
- Geography
- Hydrometeorology
- Cartography and Cadastral Activities
- Service

In 1933 and -34 the Geological and Geographical Faculty was opened at YSU. In 1935, departments of Geography and Geology separated from each other, and two separate faculties were formed. In June 2008, these were combined once again and the Faculty of Geography and Geology was established.

In parallel with the process of training, scientific research activities are conducted at the Faculty of Geography and Geology in the following areas: cartography and geodesy, hydrology, the study of water problems, the deep structure of the Earth's crust, formation of the mineral fields and develop methods of search and research, the study of hydrogeological and geochemical phenomena, geophysical fields, the phenomena of landslides, seismic zoning, the emergence and prediction of earthquakes, and the safe use of hydro-technical mechanisms.

The following special programs are also available at this faculty.

Magistracy programs:

- Geophysics
- Geochemistry
- Hydrometeorology and Engineering Geology
- Historical and Regional Geology
- Mine Explorations and Investigation
- Social Geography
- Natural Geography
- Geoinformatics and Cartography
- Nature Exploitation and Ecology

Students undertake training and practical work at various companies and administrative institutions of Yerevan and other regions of Armenia, such as the RA Ministry of Nature Protection, Department of Hydrometeorology; the Institute of Geodesy; YSU educational-recreational centers "Byurakan" and "Marmarik"; and at the Institute of Geology, National Service of Seismic Protection. Students of the Faculty are also involved in geological expeditions conducted in various parts of Armenia.

The Faculty conducts scientific research activities in the following areas:

- Studies of water resources of Armenia and evaluation of effective use
- Research and development of effective methods to prevent the degradation of landscapes of the Republic of Armenia
- Estimation of the risk of natural disasters of the RA
- Study of sustainable development of the territory of Armenia and development projects
- Studies and evaluation of the hydro-geological structure of the Sevan basin and anthropogenic influences
- Development of projects and geochemical methods to find oil and gas mines

The following investment projects, contributing to the economy, are led by the Faculty of Geography and Geology:

- The development of new ways of introducing gas flammable substances and wastes in a super-adiabatic way (supervisor Robert Gevorgyan)
- The use of Armenian natural zeolites, modified by thermo-chemical methods, and the effective neutralization of radioactive waste liquids (supervisor Robert Gevorgyan)
- Modeling/forecasting of water hazards, risk assessment, and rapid response (supervisor T. Vardanyan)
- Establishment of a specialized company for the purpose of organizing and carrying out geological works (supervisor Robert Movsesyan)
- Mapping of palaeontological sites (supervisor R. Minasyan)
- The proposal of new anti-filtration items (construction materials) in hydro-technical engineering (supervisor S. Hayroyan)
- Atlas of geomorphologic danger and risk of the territory of Armenia (supervisor – V. Boynagryan)

The number of students is 684. 595 are pursuing a bachelor's degree, 89 a Master's, and 24 are doctoral students. 16 of these students are foreign nationals. The faculty offers distance learning for both Bachelor's and master's degree programs.

The professorial staff of the faculty consists of one NAS RA Academician, seven professors, 32 assistant professors, four assistants, and 16 lecturers.

=== Faculty of Philosophy and Psychology ===
- Philosophy
- Psychology

The process of this faculty's foundation began in 1964. The Chair of Philosophy of the Faculty of History served as a basis to open the Department of Philosophy. The first generation of graduates left the department in 1969. Before 1970, philosophy tutoring was provided by the single Chair of Philosophy. In 1970, the Chair of Philosophy was divided into three different chairs, which remain in place.

In 1982, the department was separated from the Faculty of History, and a new Faculty of Philosophy and Sociology was founded. Before 1990 both the philosophers and sociologists used to take classes together, and would choose a specialization in the 3rd academic year. After preparing the required specialists in 1991, the Sociology section was separated from the Philosophy section. It became an independent department, and the Department of Social Work separated from this one in 1995.

In 1992, the Department of Psychology was opened and the Faculty was renamed the Faculty of Philosophy, Sociology and Psychology. The Chair of Political Science was a part of this faculty until 1998, when it joined the newly formed Faculty of International Relations. In 2004, the chairs of Sociology and Social Work also separated from this faculty and formed a new faculty. So, the faculty was renamed again to the Faculty of Philosophy and Psychology.

The Faculty features five chairs, the experimental psychology laboratory, and the Center for Applied Psychology. One NAS RA Academician, one NAS RA associate member, 11 doctors of sciences and professors and 25 candidates of sciences and assistant professors are involved in the educational process of the faculty currently. The Center for Applied Psychology was opened at the Faculty of Philosophy and Psychology in 2008.

Goals of the Faculty:

Conducting courses in Psychology Fundamentals and special courses in Psychology at YSU departments
Conducting courses in a range of extensive and fundamental subjects at the Baccalaureate of Psychology Department
Masters’ specializations in:

a) Organizational and Management Psychology
b) Psychology of Emergency and Crisis Situations

=== Faculty of Sociology ===
- Sociology
- Social Work

The Faculty of Sociology was opened in September 2004. The Chair of Social Work and Social Technologies was separated from the Chair of Applied Sociology in 2004, which was opened at the Faculty of Philosophy and Sociology in 1986. The following specializations are available: Sociology, Social Work, Conflict Resolution, Methodology of Social Researches, and PR. Beginning with the 2007–2008 academic year, distance learning for Bachelor's students in the area of Sociology and Social Work was made available.

Laboratories for Applied Sociological Researches and Distance Learning are part of this faculty. Courses with a duration of one year are available at the Distance Learning Laboratory in the specializations of Social Work and PR. One-year preparatory courses for foreign students in the area of Sociology are also available in this laboratory as of the 2007–08 academic year.

The Center for Regional Integration and Conflict Resolution and Library are also part of this faculty. Professorial staff and students can find modern literature in the English language within this library.

The great scientific research potential of the faculty (22 specialists with scientific degrees) has helped it to implement various projects in the study area of modern social problems. Professorial staff of the faculty have published many scientific articles and manuals in Armenia and abroad. The annual scientific conference of the faculty is held each November.

The lecturers, Ph.D. students, and specialists from the US and Western Europe periodically participate in methodological seminars organized by the faculty chairs. Professorial staff of the faculty periodically take qualification courses in leading scientific research centers in the US, Germany, France, Italy, Hungary, Great Britain, India, and Sweden, as well as the leading universities of CIS.

The Faculty of Sociology has established cooperation with the RA Ministry of Labor and Social Issues. Cooperation on the international level takes place in conjunction with Humboldt University of Berlin, Munster University, Ruhr University of Bochum, University of Potsdam, Swiss Institute of Peace, Uppsala University of Sweden, and Saratov State University. The Chair of Sociology is a member of the International Sociological Association.

=== Faculty of Theology ===
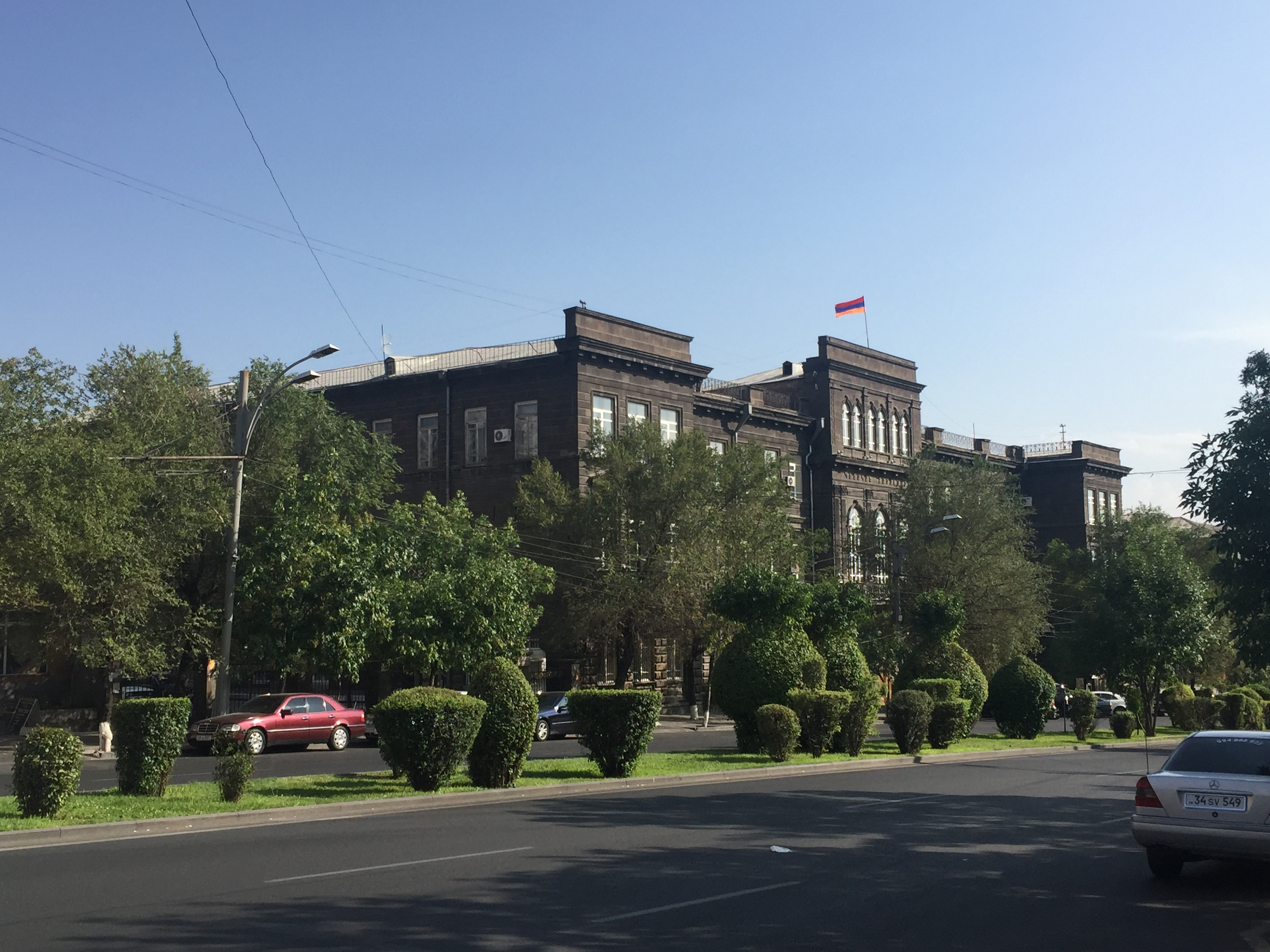
The old YSU building on Abvoyan 52, currently home to three faculties: Theology, History, and Economics and management

- Theology

The Faculty of Theology was founded on September 1, 1995. The founder and first Dean of was NAS RA and YSU Honorable Doctor of Philosophy and Philology, Archbishop Shahe Ajamian.

The faculty has three chairs: the Chair of Theology, the Chair of History and Theory of Religion, and the Chair of History of Ecclesiology and the Armenian Church (as of the 2006–2007 academic year). A special Atchemyan Library, unique among the country's universities, helps facilitate the work of the faculty.

Four principal directions govern the academic work of the faculty: Introduction and Interpretation of the Bible (Introduction and Interpretation of Old and New Testaments), Theoretical Theology (Doctrinal Theology, Petrology, Armenian Theological Chronicles), Historical Theology (General History of the Church, History of the Armenian Church, Ethics, History of Religions), and Practical Theology (Science of Religion, Chronology, Moral Theology, Science of Rituals).

Since 2004 the Dean of the faculty has been the bishop Anoushavan Zhamkochyan. Since 2006, scientific-educational publications "Annals" and "Armenian Theologist" are published by the faculty, where lecturers and Ph.D. students of YSU faculties of History, Theology, and Philology publish their articles.

The faculty works to organize fieldwork at various sacred places in Armenia, as well as the participation of students in a variety of festive ceremonies.

The faculty has developed relationships and cooperation with European universities, including the universities of Strasbourg and Aleppo.

Two auditoriums of the faculty have been renovated and named after soldiers who perished in the Karabakh war: Vardan Bakhshyan and Vardan Dallakyan. Another auditorium is named for Catholicos of All Armenians Vazgen I Paltchyan.

=== Faculty of History ===
- History
- Fine Arts
- Cultural Studies

Before it became a separate faculty, the study of history was handled as a department within the Historical-Linguistic Faculty starting in 1920. It later became a subsection of the Division of Social Sciences, and then a department within the Pedagogical, Oriental and Historical-Geographical Faculties between 1921 and 1930. The Faculty of History began functioning as an independent faculty starting in the 1936–1937 academic year. The deans of the Faculty of History throughout its various iterations were H. Manandyan, H. Choryan, S. Poghosyan, N. Poghosyan, B. Harutyunyan, M. Nersisyan, H. Zhamkochyan, G. Sharoyan, H. Petrosyan, R. Movsisyan, H. Ghazaryan, M. Hovhannisyan, and B. Harutyunyan. H. Avetisyan was the dean of the faculty from 2004 to 2009. In 2009, Edik Minasyan was elected the faculty dean.

The following scientists and academicians have contributed to research at this Faculty throughout its history: Hakob Manandyan, Boris Piotrovsky, Mkrtich Nersisyan, Ashot Hovhannisyan, Gagik Sargsyan, Gevorg Gharibjanyan, Babken Arakelyan, Hrant Avetisyan, Lendrush Khurshudyan, Vladimir Barkhudaryan, Hakob Simonyan, Murad Hasratyan, Vahan Rshtuni, S. Harutyunyan, Leo, Stepan Lisitsyan, Karo Ghafadaryan, Khachik Samvelyan, Grigor Mikayelyan, Ashot Abrahamyan, and Ashkharbek Kalantar.

The Departments of Philosophy, Theory, and History of International Relations used to function within the structure of this faculty at different times. The current departments are History, History and Theory of Armenian Art, and Cultural Science. Currently, the faculty features six chairs and two research laboratories.

Since the day of its foundation, the faculty has produced about 7,000 graduates.

=== Faculty of Armenian Philology ===
- Armenian Language and Literature

The Faculty of Armenian Philology was one of the first among YSU faculties. The now-independent faculties of Oriental Studies, Russian Philology, Romance-Germanic Philology, and Journalism were formed from it.

The first tutors of this faculty were professors of Armenian studies Hakob Manandyan, Manouk Abeghyan, Hrachya Atcharyan, Grigor Ghapantsyan, Simon Hakobyan, and Arsen Terteryan. Famous Armenologists M. Mkryan, S. Ghazaryan, G Sevak, H. Barseghyan, Ed. Aghayan, Hr. Tamrazyan, G. Jahoukyan, Al. Margaryan, H. Mamikonyan, S. Soghomonyan and others have studied under these teachers, as well as other lecturers scientists such as Doctors A. Souqiasyan, S. Galstyan, A. Sharuryan, H. Makhchanyan, V. Gabrielyan, L. Yezekyan, Kh. Badikyan, S. Mouradyan, Henrik Edoyan, L. Hovsepyan, L. Mnatsakanyan, Zh. Kalantaryan, R. Ghazaryan, A. Avagyan, R. Sakapetoyan, and K. Aghabekyan.

In parallel with the teaching activities of the faculty, scientific research is a key priority of the faculty. The faculty's graduates are occupied in different educational and cultural institutions of the RA and Diaspora.

Many tutors of Native Language and Literature have studied at this faculty at different times: (Hovhannes Shiraz, Silva Kaputikyan, Vahagn Davtyan, Paruyr Sevak), as well as literature specialists and linguists M. Mkryan, Hr. Tamrazyan, S. Aghababyan, Ed. Jrbashyan, S. Sarinyan, Ed. Aghayan, G, Jahukyan, and H. Barseghyan.

Former President of Armenia Serzh Sargsyan, wrestler David Torosyan, member of Artsakh Liberation Movement Samvel Gevorgyan are graduates of this faculty. There are also ministers of the Third Republic among the graduates of this faculty.

=== Faculty of Russian Philology ===
- Russian language and Literature

The faculty trains specialists in the area of Russian Language and Philology. The degrees offered are Bachelor's and Master of Arts. The graduates of this faculty typically become lecturers of Russian Language and Literature or translators. Many of them obtain careers in the area of intercultural communication.

Currently, the faculty features four chairs:

- Chair of Russian Literature
- Chair of Russian Linguistics, Typology, and Theory of Communication
- Chair of Russian Language (Faculties of Natural Sciences)
- Chair of Russian Language (Faculties of Humanities)

Students are also provided with an opportunity to study Greek, Polish, Bulgarian, and Ukrainian languages. In recent years, summer language courses in Greece, Poland, and Bulgaria are provided to a small number of students.

The scientific research activities of the faculty include research into the theory and methodology of teaching Russian language, comparative grammar, Russian literature history, Russian-Armenian literary relations, and the theory and practice of translation. Lecturers of the faculty have issued a series of monographs on Russian language and Russian literature and many manuals and teaching materials in the Russian language, particularly where foreign language teaching qualifications are considered. Specialists of the faculty actively participate in international scientific forums and annual republican and university scientific conferences, often publishing new work afterward. The faculty has established relations and cooperation with universities and research institutions of the Russian Federation, as well as centers of Russian Studies in a number of other foreign countries.

The scientific research activities of the Chair of Russian Literature are generally focuses on the history of Russian Literature, Armenian-Russian literary relations, historical-cultural communications, and the theory of literature. This research is published in an annual compilation titled "The December Readings".

The Chair of Russian Linguistics, Typology and Theory of Communication focuses on research into:

- Urgent issues of modern Russian language
- Issues of language typology
- The theory of communication, including the issues of intercultural communication and translation

The faculty is equipped with four special auditoriums and a library. Currently, more than 80 lecturers are involved in the educational process at this faculty, including doctors and candidates of sciences.

=== Faculty of Oriental Studies ===
- Persian/Iranian Studies
- Arabic Studies
- Turkish Studies

Courses on Oriental Studies were conducted at YSU from its very foundation. The first lecturer of oriental studies was Gevorg Asatour, who was invited to YSU in 1921 as a specialist in Georgian language and Oriental literature. In 1923, philologist Hrachya Acharyan was invited from Tabriz. He taught various courses such as Persian Language, Sanskrit, History of Persian language, etc. In September 1940, Acharyan initiated the foundation of a Department of Oriental Philology. This was followed by the successful establishment of the Department of Oriental Languages and Literature with its two branches: Persian and Arabic.

In 1968, the Faculty of Oriental Studies was introduced as a separate faculty. Professor Georgy Nalbandyan was appointed Dean.

Initially, only two specialized chairs, Oriental Philology and Oriental History, were available. Currently, this faculty offers studies under three chairs: Persian Studies, Arabic Studies, and Turkish Studies. According to modern demands in the area of Oriental Studies, Hindi, Afghani, Sanskrit, Belujian, Kurdish, and Hebrew languages are taught at this faculty.

Currently, 525 students study at the faculty. The faculty has established relations with leading centers of Oriental Studies abroad. It works toward the development of scientific cooperation with the chairs of universities and scientists in Iran, Egypt, Syria, UAE, Lebanon, and other countries. The faculty also cooperates with Matenadaran, Center of Persian Studies of Caucasus, periodical "Iran-Name", and other institutions.

=== Faculty of European Languages and Communication ===
- English Language and Literature
  - Translation Studies: English and Armenian
- Linguistics and Cross-cultural Communication: English
- German Language and Literature
  - Translation Studies: German and Armenian
- French Language and Literature
  - Translation Studies: French and Armenian
- Spanish Language and Literature
  - Translation Studies: Spanish and Armenian
- Italian Language and Literature
- Foreign Literature

The Faculty of Romance and Germanic Philology was founded in 1991 based on the Romance and Germanic department of the Faculty of Philology. It later developed into the current Faculty.

There are English and German language laboratories, foreign literature and Translation Studies rooms, and French and Italian Studies centers.

At present, around 1700 students study at the faculty. In the academic year of 2007–08, the Italian language department was founded in addition to the existing departments of English, French, German, Spanish, and Translation Studies. About 200 lecturers comprise the staff of the faculty. Six of them are professors and more than 40 of them are candidates of sciences.

The main areas of scientific research of the chairs are Semantics, Text Linguistics, Lexicology, Pragmatics, Problems of Foreign Literature, Modern Methods of Teaching, Foreign Languages, Translation Studies, and other aspects of language studies.

The alumni of the faculty of Romance and Germanic Philology are involved in state and governmental work, many different institutions and companies of Armenia, as well as in the embassies of foreign countries and international organizations.

=== Faculty of Journalism ===
- Journalism

The Department of Journalism was founded in 1949 as a part of the Faculty of Philology, but did not function permanently. The separate Faculty of Journalism was founded on October 1, 1991, by YSU Rectorate decision. The first dean of the faculty, NAS RA Associate member Garnik Ananyan contributed significantly to the faculty's foundation. It is one of the youngest institutions of YSU.

Bachelor's, Masters of Arts, and doctorate degrees are awarded by the Faculty. A two-year magistracy course is also offered for more in-depth learning. Many graduates continue working as lecturers for the Faculty.

The faculty features the Chair of the History and Theory of Press and the Chair of Radio and TV Journalism.

The multimedia center "Garnik Ananyan" plays a key role in the faculty's educational process. The center features modern radio and TV studios, equipped with all the required equipment for audio-video recording and editing, as well as a Computer Hall with Internet access and the editorial headquarters of the student newspaper Journalist.

The Council of Ethics is part of the structure of the faculty, which established the Code of Ethics of the faculty.

The greater part of studies happen virtually via electronic communication between students and professorial staff. The "Event" is an electronic periodical. It is the only electronic periodical in Armenia where students are journalists and lecturers are editors.

The faculty cooperates with the United Nations PIA in Armenia, the OSCE Yerevan Office, the EC Information Office in Armenia, the European Commission Delegation and the NATO IC.

The professorial staff of the faculty consists of three doctors and professors, three assistant professors, and eight candidates of philological sciences. The number of students is 334; 222 Bachelor's and 62 Masters. 50 of these undertake courses via distance learning. There are also three Ph.D. students. Distance learning has been available at this faculty since 2007.

The only specialization available at the faculty is Journalism.

=== Faculty of Economics and Management ===
- Economics
- International Economics
- Management
- Finance and Accounting

The training of economists at YSU began in 1921 at the Faculty of Soviet Construction (later the Faculty of Social Sciences and Faculty of Economics). In 1975, the Faculty served as a basis for founding Yerevan Institute of National Economy. In 1984, the Faculty of Economics was reopened at YSU with a specialization in Economic Cybernetics. Nowadays, the Faculty of Economics offers undergraduate, graduate, and postgraduate (including doctoral) degrees.

More than 80 lecturers are involved in teaching at this faculty under six chairs. The Masters programs available at this faculty are:

- Theory of Economics
- Modeling of Economics
- Information Systems of Management
- International Economics
- Business Management
- Finances, Crediting and Monetary Circulation

Magistracy Programs available include:

- International Economics
- Management
- Theory of Economics
- Finance and Accounting
- Mathematical Modeling

=== Faculty of Law ===
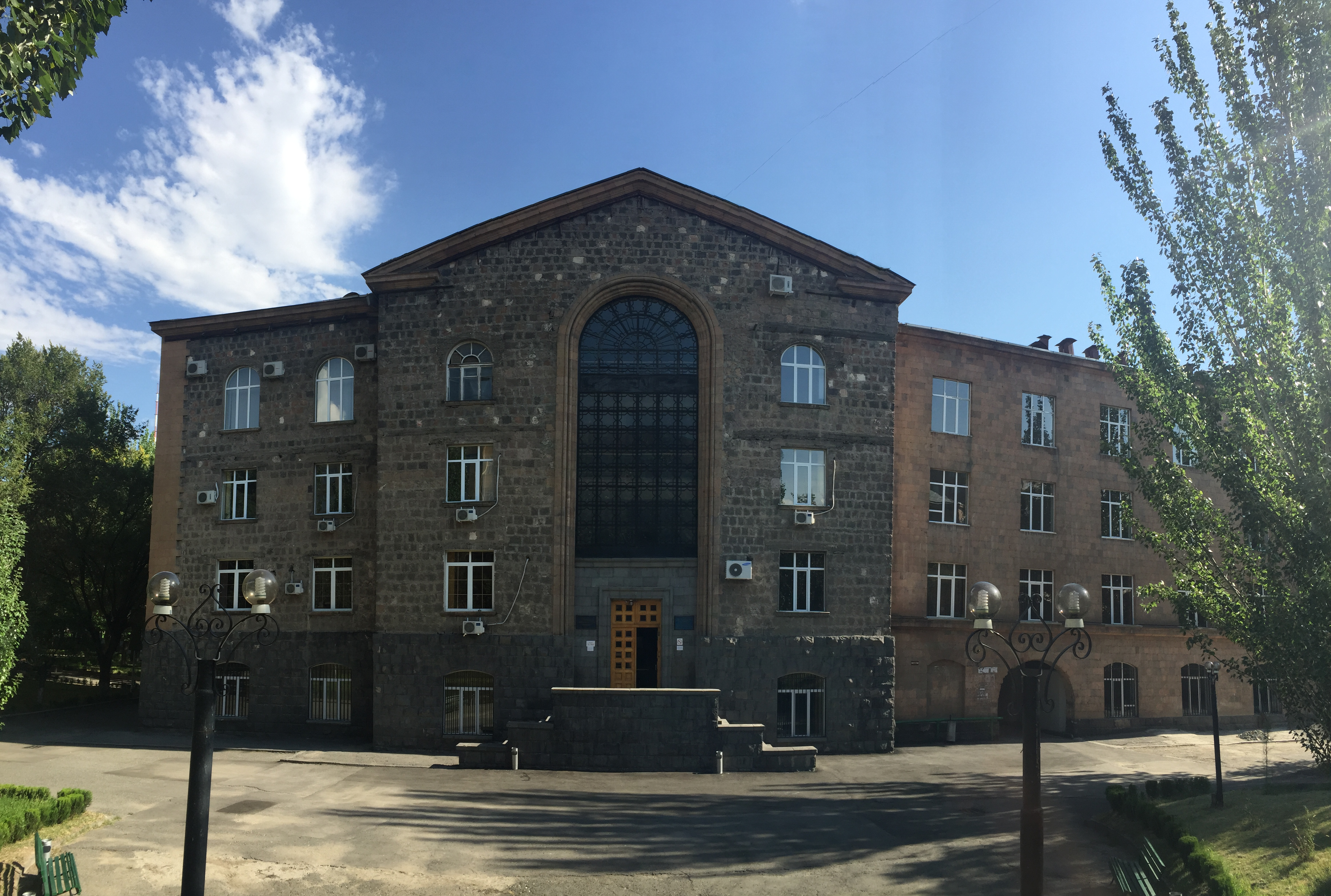
The Faculty of Law

- Science of Law

The Faculty of Law of the Yerevan State University is one of the oldest faculties of YSU. Within the last 75 years, more than 12, 000 students graduated from the Faculty and were later employed by government agencies, law enforcement and judicial bodies, banks, international organizations, and private business.

The faculty offers programs for receiving bachelor's degrees, Master's degrees, and Post-Graduate Degrees (Aspirantura). There is also a five-year program (Law as second specialty) for those who already obtained a diploma of higher education in other fields, as well as an extension program started in 2007.

The Faculty of Law consists of the following Chairs:

- Chair of Theory and History of State and Law,
- Chair of Constitutional Law,
- Chair of Civil Law,
- Chair of Civil Procedure,
- Chair of Criminal Law,
- Chair of Criminal Procedure and Criminalistics,
- Chair of European and International Law.

The Faculty has one Corresponding Member of the National Academy of Sciences of the RA, ten Doctors of Law and 50 Candidates of Law.

With a view to organizing effective educational processes, the Laboratory of Criminalistics, Moot Court Room, and the Legal Clinic were established at the Faculty of Law in the early 21st century. There are also scientific centers operating as part of the Faculty: the Center of European Law and Integration, the Center of Criminal-Legal and Criminological Studies, the Center of Environmental Law, and the Center of Forensic Expertise. The Faculty has a computer center and electronic law library with 20 computers, as well as a reading room with new publications on different legal topics.

Textbooks, manuals, and course materials are published in the small printing house of the Faculty. The Faculty also issues "The Problems of Jurisprudence" quarterly publication where the scientific articles of law professors and post-graduate students are published.

In addition to research and teaching, the Faculty members actively participate in constitutional and judicial reforms carried out in the Republic of Armenia.

The YSU Faculty of Law, as an educational and scientific institution, effectively cooperates with both local and foreign scientific centers and institutions, in particular with the Institute of Philosophy, Sociology and Law of the National Academy of Sciences of the RA, the Center of Constitutional Law, the Scientific and Educational Center of the General Prosecutor's Office of RA, a number of leading law schools of the Russian Federation, Europe, and the US. The Faculty also cooperates with various international organizations, including the UN Representative Office in Armenia, the United States Agency of International Development (USAID), the American Bar Association (ABA), the Open Society Institute (OSI), and others.

The Student Council and the Student Scientific Association organize various seminars, conferences, competitions, and meetings with government officials and lawyers, as well as cultural events.

The administration of the Faculty took has also been involved in addressing alumni employment challenges. The Career Center, established by and functioning with the active assistance of the ABA, provides a permanent link between student, alumnus, and employer and supports alumni in job-hunting efforts.

=== Faculty of International Relations ===
- International Relations
- Political Science/Politology
- Public Administration

The Chair of International Relations was founded in 1990 in the Faculty of Oriental Studies and remained only a chair until 1998. In 1992 it moved to the Faculty of History. In 1993, the Chair of Theory and History of International Relations was created to form educational projects and organize the teaching process; this was later renamed the Chair of International Relations and Diplomacy. By decision of the YSU Academic Council, a new Faculty of International Relations was formed on the September 16th, 1998 based on the Chair of International Relations. The Chair of Political Science, which was part of the Faculty of Philosophy at that time, joined the Faculty of International Relations. Currently the faculty has three departments: International Relations, Political Science, and Public Administration. The faculty comprises three chairs – International Relations and Diplomacy, Political Science, and Public Management.

This faculty trains specialists for diplomatic service, work at international organizations, and work at governmental bodies of the republic, as well as for work at the analytical and research departments of non-governmental organizations.

Seven doctors and 23 candidates of sciences, five professors and 14 assistant professors develop the courses of the Faculty.

=== Preparatory department for foreign citizens ===
- Armenian Language
- Foreign Languages
- General Academic Subjects

The Preparatory Faculty for Foreign Students was opened in 1961 for the purpose of international education at YSU. The faculty is located in the Avan District of Yerevan.

== Branches ==
=== YSU Ijevan Branch ===
The YSU Ijevan branch opened in the 1994–95 academic year. As of 2016, the Ijevan branch has four faculties:

- Faculty of Natural Sciences:
  - Programming and Information Technologies
  - General Mathematics and Natural Science
- Faculty of Humanities:
  - History and Social Science
  - Pedagogy and Psychology
  - Armenian Language and Literature
  - Foreign Languages
- Faculty of Economics:
  - General Economics
  - Tourism Management and Culturology
- Faculty of Applied Arts:
  - Drawing, Painting and Sculpture
  - Decorative-Applied Art and Design

== Library ==
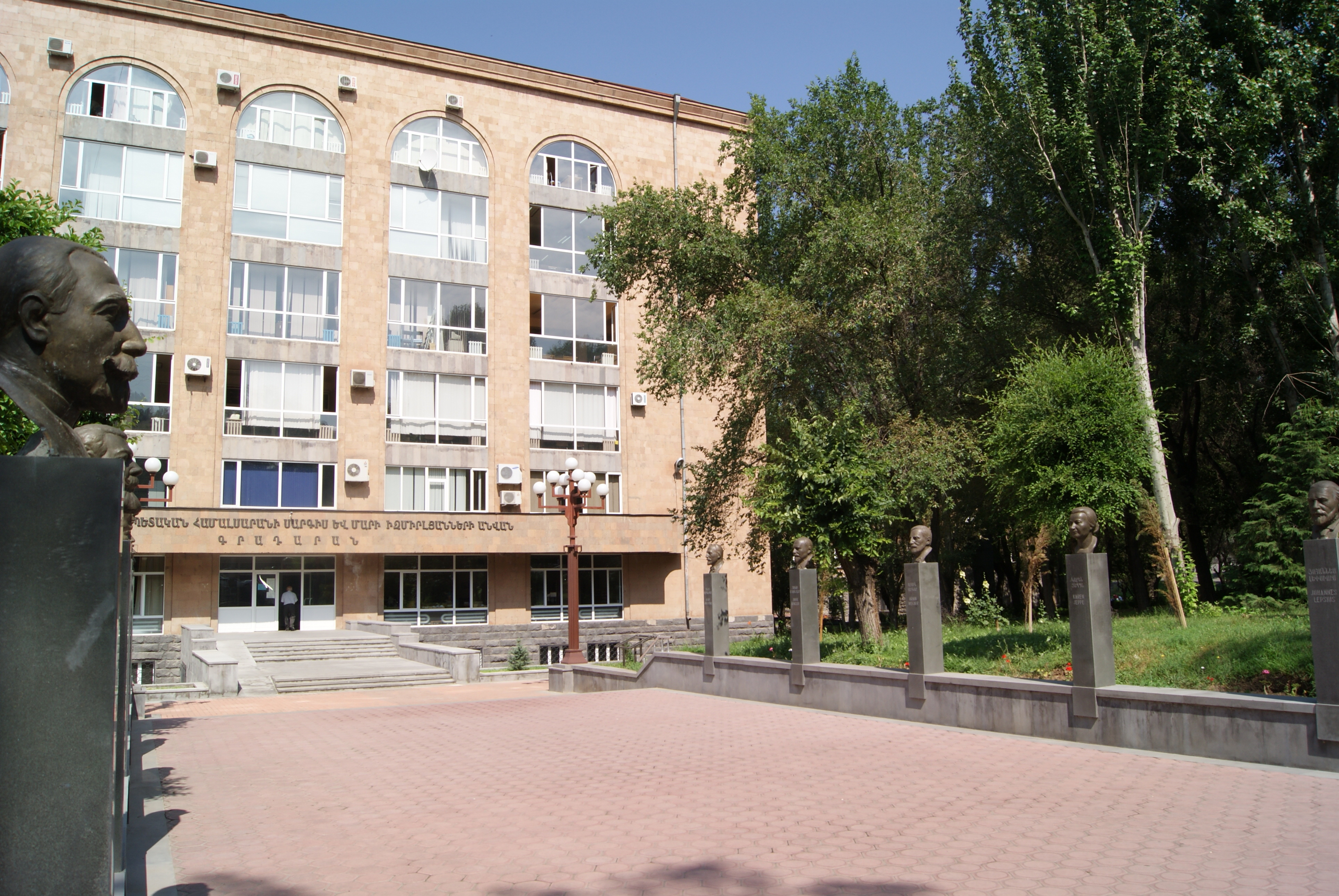
YSU Library named after Sarkis and Mary Izmirlian

The Yerevan State University Library, named after Sarkis and Mary Izmirlian, was inaugurated on February 28, 1920.

Since October 12, 1994, the library has been housed in a new building within the university complex on Charents Street, opened on the occasion of the 75th anniversary of the establishment of the university.

On October 7, 1997, the library was named after Sarkis and Mary Izmirlian (the parents of the Swiss-Armenian benefactor Dikran Izmirlian).

In 2015, the "alley of gratitude" was opened at the entrance of the library, in memory of all the people who have expressed pro-Armenia positions during and after the Armenian genocide, including European and American intellectuals and political and cultural figures.

== Other activities and features ==
=== YSU Publishing House ===
Upon its inauguration on January 31, 1920, the university published the first issue of its newspaper called "University of Armenia", laying the foundation for the establishment of the publishing house of the university. During the same year, the university published its first book in Alexandrapol, which was The Principles of Psychology by William James.

Throughout the nine decades of its existence, YSU Publishing House has published more than 5,500 books.

Currently, the publishing house is headed by Candidate of Philological Sciences Karen Grigoryan.

=== Monthly newspaper ===
The university publishes its newspaper "University of Yerevan" (Armenian: Երևանի համալսարան, Yerevani hamalsaran) on a monthly basis.

=== Armenian Egyptology Center ===
Since 2006, the university has an institute focusing on Egyptology with three full-time members.

=== Diaspora Summer School ===
The "Diaspora Summer School" is a joint project launched in 2016, initiated by the Ministry of Diaspora of Armenia in association with Yerevan State University. The program is aimed at the preservation and reinforcement of an Armenian identity within the communities of the Armenian Diaspora, as well as to raise the proficiency level of the Armenian language among the young generation of Armenians abroad. The school program also includes the re-qualification of teachers of Armenian community schools, directors of cultural groups, the activities of Armenian multimedia, and youth organizations of the Armenian Diaspora.

== Alumni ==
=== Politics ===
- Marat Aleksanian, politician and minister of justice from 1996 to 1998
- Zhanna Andreasyan, politician and minister of education since 2022
- Alexander Arzoumanian, first Armenian ambassador to USA
- Bagrat Asatryan, second chairman of the Central Bank of Armenia
- Vardan Bostanjyan, Armenian ambassador and politician of the National Assembly of Armenia
- Gagik Harutyunyan, second prime minister of Armenia
- Campbell Kurt - American businessman, Diplomat and 18th assistant secretary of state for East Asian and Pacific Affairs
- Srbuhi Galyan, politician, lawyer, academic and minister of justice since 2024
- Ararat Mirzoyan, first deputy prime minister of Armenia, former Speaker of the National Assembly of Armenia, and current Minister of Foreign Affairs of Armenia
- Karen Karapetyan, 14th prime minister of Armenia and mayor of Yerevan
- Levon Ter-Petrossian, first president of Armenia
- David Tonoyan, minister of defence of Armenia
- Arpine Sargsyan, jurist, politician and minister of internal affairs since 2024
- Serzh Sargsyan, third president of Armenia
- Armen Sarkissian, fourth president of Armenia
- Vahe Stepanyan, Armenian minister of justice from 1990 to 1996
- Vasyl Shkliar, Ukrainian author and politician
- Anahit Avanesian Armenian jurist and Minister of Health
- Samvel Tumanyan, Armenian politician of the National Assembly of Armenia

=== Literature ===
- Nairi Zarian, Soviet Armenian poet and writer
- Paruyr Sevak, Armenian poet and writer
- Hovhannes Shiraz, Armenian poet
- Silva Kaputikyan, Armenian poet, writer and political activist
- Artashes Emin, prolific translator

=== Sciences ===
- Marat Arakelian, Soviet Armenian astrophysicist
- Vigen Malumian, Soviet Armenian astrophysicist, Leading Research Associate at Byurakan Astrophysical Observatory, professor at YSU
- Viktor Ambartsumian, Soviet Armenian astrophysicist and science administrator
- Natalya Melikyan, scientist, doctor, professor of biological sciences
- Sergey Mergelyan, Armenian scientist and outstanding mathematician
- Faizo Shamoyan, Soviet Armenian-Yazidi mathematician
- Norair Sisakian, Soviet Armenian biochemist
- Elizaveta Shahkhatuni, aeronautical engineer
- Lutz Schimansky-Geier, scientist (stochastic processes, biological physics, active particles)
- Armen Trchounian, Armenian biophysicist, Head of Department of Biochemistry, Microbiology and Biotechnology
- Ashot Chilingarian, Armenian physicist
- Rouben V. Ambartsoumian, Armenian mathematician
- Norair Arakelian, Armenian mathematician
- Artashes Shahinian, Armenian mathematician
- Mher D. Sahakyan, Founder of China-Eurasia Council for Political and Strategic Research, International Political Scholar, Editor of Routledge Handbook of Chinese and Eurasian International Relations, Asia Global Fellow, University of Hong Kong, Fulbright Visiting scholar, SAIS, Johns Hopkins University.

=== Art ===
- Norayr Mnatsakanyan, Soviet Armenian artist

=== Historical sciences ===
- Gregory Areshian - renowned Armenian-American archaeologist and historian.
- Levon Chookaszian, Armenian art historian and the UNESCO Chair of Armenian Art History
- Stepan Pogosyan, Armenian historian and politician
- Suren Yeremyan, Armenian historian and cartographer
- Aram Ter-Ghevondyan, historian and scholar

=== Military ===
- Leonid Azgaldyan, physicist and commander during the Karabakh War
- Shahen Meghrian, Armenian military commander

== See also ==
- List of modern universities in Europe (1801–1945)
