= Ministry of Justice (Armenia) =

Government ministry of Armenia

Ministry of Justice of Armenia
- Հայաստանի արդարադատության նախարարություն
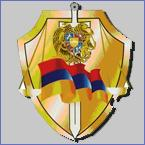

Agency overview
- Formed: August 7, 1918
- Jurisdiction: Government of Armenia
- Headquarters: Yerevan, Armenia
- Minister responsible: Srbuhi Galyan, Minister of Justice
- Website: moj.am

The Ministry of Justice of Armenia (Armenian: Հայաստանի արդարադատության նախարարություն) is an Armenian government agency which possesses executive authority and executes policies of the Government of Armenia in sectors that are closely associated with laws and regulations. The ministry oversees the operations of the following agencies:

- Compulsory Enforcement Service
- Penitentiary Service
- Probation Service

The ministry was founded in 1918 by the government of Hovhannes Kajaznuni of the newly-formed Republic of Armenia.

== History ==
In 1920, the Revolutionary Committee of the Armenian SSR founded the People's Commissariat of Justice, which began to control the Armenian prosecutor's office in December 1923. The Communist Party of Armenia was in-active from 1930 to 1933, of which during those three years, the justice system of Armenia was administered by the Procurator General of the Soviet Union and the Supreme Court of the USSR. In 1936, the prosecutor's office and the investigative bodies were separated from the People's Court of Justice, and the People's Commissariat was reorganized into the Ministry of Justice. It operated until 1959, when its functions were exercised by the Supreme Court until the 1970s. By order of the Supreme Soviet of the USSR of November 2, 1970, the Ministry of Justice of the Armenian SSR was reestablished and became the precursor to the Ministry of Justice of Armenia which was founded in 1991, following the USSR's demise.

The Ministry also oversees the registration of political parties in Armenia. As of March 2021, there are 91 political parties that are registered with the Ministry of Justice.

== List of ministers ==
=== First Republic of Armenia ===
| Name | Appointed | Dismissed | Notes |
|---|---|---|---|
| Grigor Ter-Petrosyan | May 28, 1918 | November 4, 1918 | |
| Harutyun Chmshkyan | April 27, 1919 | 1919 | |
| Samson Harutyunyan | November 4, 1918 | Spring 1919 | |
| Arsham Khondkaryan | 1919 | 1919 | |
| Abraham Gyulkhandanyan | August 10, 1919 | Spring, 1920 | |
| Artashes Chilingaryan | May 5, 1920 | Autumn 1920 | |

=== People's Commissars and Ministers of Justice of the Armenian SSR ===
| Name | Appointed | Dismissed | Notes |
|---|---|---|---|
| Sargis Baghdasaryan | 6 December 1920 | 29 December 1920 | |
| Süleyman Nuri | January 1921 | 17 February 1921 | |
| Aghasi Vardayan | 8 April 1921 | 9 May 1921 | |
| Artashes Karinyan | 21 May 1921 | September 1921 | |
| Alexander Shahverdyan | 17 September 1921 | 23 September 1922 | |
| Danush Shahverdyan | 23 September 1922 | 19 November 1923 | |
| Levon Vardapetyan | 19 November 1923 | 24 April 1927 | |
| Zarmayr Ashrafyan | 24 April 1927 | 30 March 1929 | |
| Armenak Hovsepyan | 30 March 1929 | 21 November 1929 | |
| Sargis Khanoyan | 21 November 1929 | December 1929 | In 1930, the commissariat was abolished |
| Petik Torosyan | 28 January 1933 | 1 August 1936 | In 1933, the commissariat was reinstituted |
| Armenak Hovsepyan | 1 August 1936 | 29 July 1937 | |
| Rza Valibeyov | 4 October 1937 | 2 November 1937 | |
| Habet Abajyan | 27 February 1938 | 10 July 1938 | |
| Safar Alimammadov | 14 July 1938 | 27 December 1940 | |
| Kajik Hakobyan | 3 January 1941 | 4 September 1941 | |
| Garnik Nazaryan | 3 November 1941 | 20 February 1948 | People's Commissar of Justice was renamed Justice Minister |
| Hayk Meghavoryan | 24 February 1948 | 29 March 1951 | |
| Aghasi Karapetyan | 29 March 1951 | March 1959 | In 1959, the ministry was abolished |
| Artavazd Gevorgyan | 29 September 1970 | 15 March 1989 | |
| Armen Ashrafyan | 11 May 1989 | November 1990 | |

=== Ministers of Justice of the Republic of Armenia ===
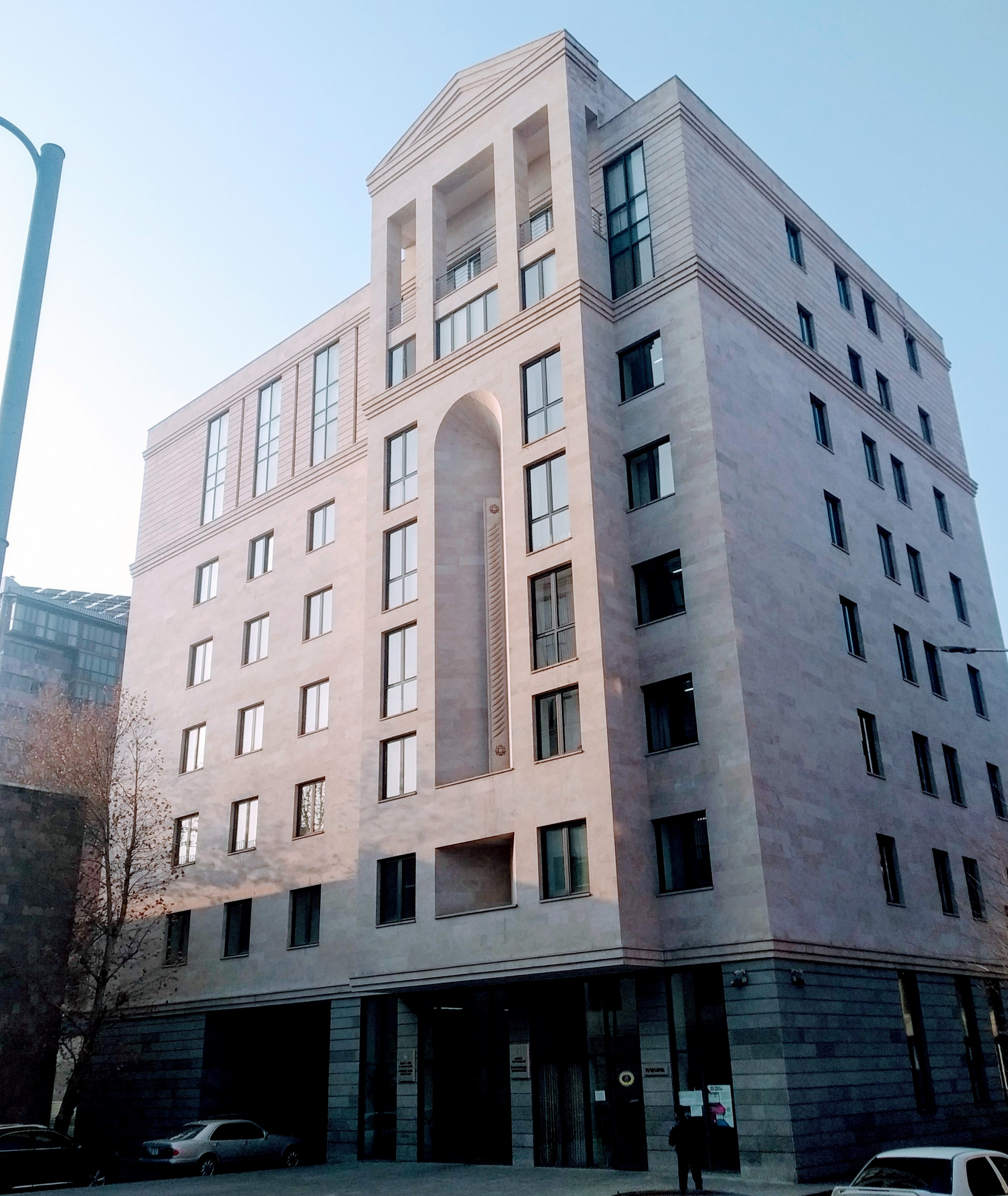
The Ministry of Justice in Yerevan

| Name | Appointed | Dismissed | Notes |
|---|---|---|---|
| Vahe Stepanyan | November 1990 | February 1996 | |
| Marat Aleksanian | February 1996 | 1998 | |
| David Harutyunyan | 1998 | May 2007 | |
| Gevorg Danielyan | May 2007 | December 9, 2010 | |
| Hrayr Tovmasyan | December 17, 2010 | April 3, 2014 | |
| Hovhannes Manukyan | April 30, 2014 | July 14, 2015 | |
| Arpine Hovhannisyan | September 4, 2015 | 2017 | First female Justice Minister |
| David Harutyunyan | 2017 | 2018 | |
| Artak Zeynalyan | 2018 | March 2019 | |
| Rustam Badasian | March 2019 | August 3, 2021 | |
| Karen Andreasyan | August 3, 2021 | October 5, 2022 | |
| Grigor Minasyan | December 26, 2022 | November 4, 2024 | |
| Srbuhi Galyan | November 5, 2024 | Present | |

== See also ==
- Justice ministry
- Politics of Armenia
