= Vahe Stepanyan =

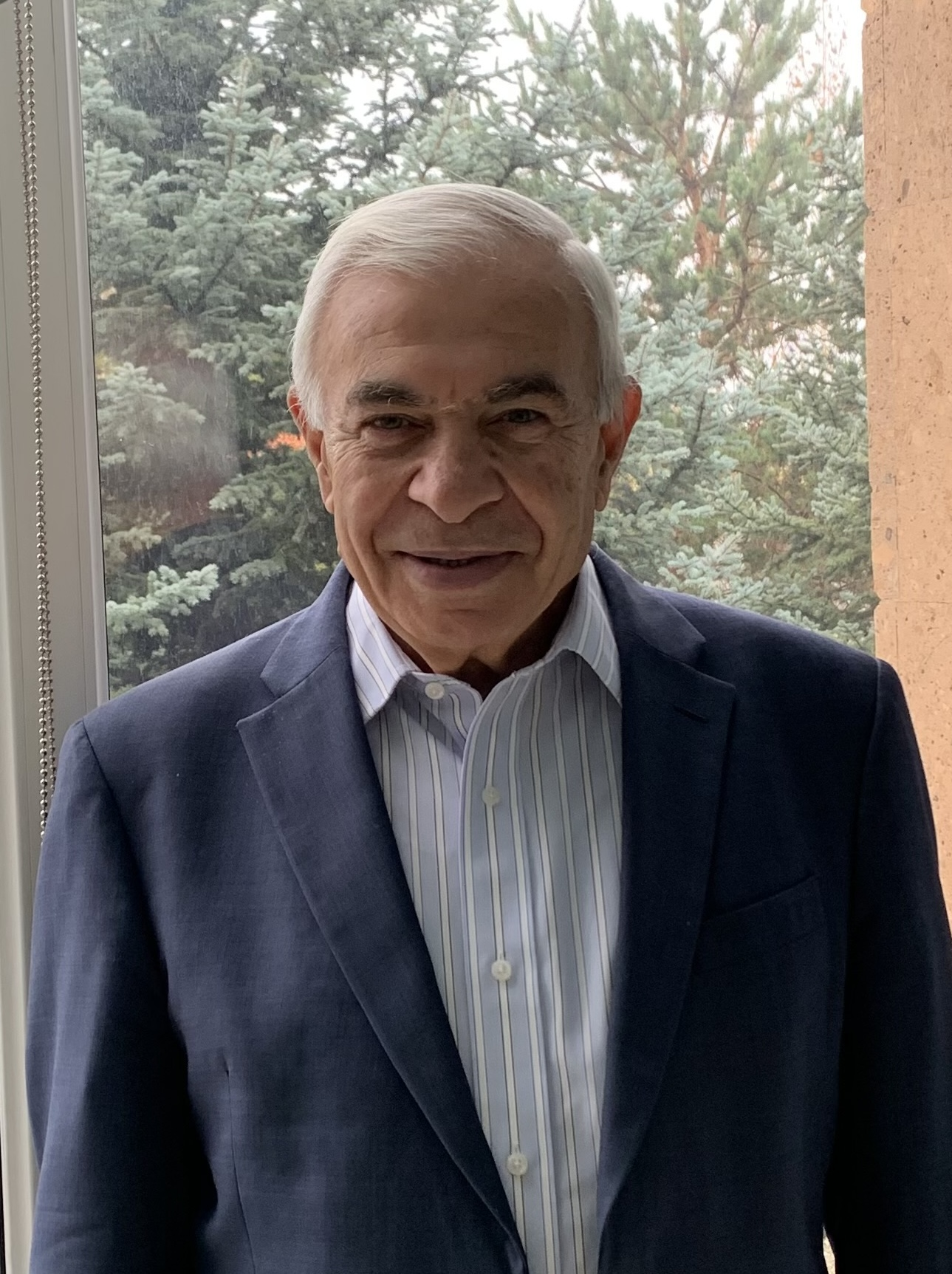

Minister of Justice of Armenia
- In office November 1990 – February 1996
- Preceded by: post created
- Succeeded by: Marat Aleksanian

Personal details
- Born: 6 April 1948 (age 78) Stepanakert, Nagorno-Karabakh Autonomous Oblast, Soviet Union
- Education: Yerevan State University

Vahe Stepanyan (Armenian: Վահե Ստեփանյան; born on April 6, 1948) is a prominent Armenian lawyer, a Doctor of Judicial Science (PhD), who served as the first minister of justice of Armenia.

Mr. Stepanyan graduated from the law department of Yerevan State University in 1972. After earning his law degree, he joined the Soviet Armed Forces the same year. In 1973, Stepanyan was admitted into a doctorate program at the All Union Research Institute of the Ministry of Justice of the USSR in Moscow where he earned the degree of a Candidate of Judicial Science.

After completing his studies at the All Union Research Institute, Stepanyan began working at the National Academy of Sciences of Armenia, Institute of Philosophy and Law, beginning with a junior research associate position and climbing all the way to the chief research associate of the academy. While working at the National Academy, Mr. Stepanyan enrolled into a post-doctorate program at the All Union Research Institute in Moscow, where he earned the degree of Doctor of Judicial Science.

In 1990, two years after earning this degree, Stepanyan was offered the position of the first Minister of Justice of the newly independent Republic of Armenia. Stepanyan accepted the position on the condition that he will be able to leave the public office as soon as the country adopted a new Constitution which would become the basis of the legal system of the independent Republic. Consequently, from 1990 to 1995 Mr. Stepanyan served as the deputy president of the Constitutional Commission of the Republic of Armenia, with the then-President of the country, Levon Ter-Petrosyan, as the president of the commission.

In 1995, the Commission presented its final draft of the Constitution to the public, and on July 5, 1995, more than 98% of the population of the Republic of Armenia approved the Constitution with their vote. Several months after the Constitution was adopted, Stepanyan left the office of the Minister of Justice in 1996.

After leaving office, Stepanyan briefly served as the deputy president of the Constitutional Court of Armenia, then opened his private legal practice. At different times between 1997 and 2008, Stepanyan combined his work in private practice with several positions mainly at educational institutions, such as the president of the Permanent Arbitration Court of Armenian Bank Association, head of the department of legal studies at the National Academy of Sciences of Armenia, head of the interstate and international law department at Hrachia Acharian University, deputy rector at the Public Administration Academy of Armenia, head of chair of private law at the Russian Armenian Slavonic University, and the president of No. 001 Supreme Certifying Commission at Yerevan State University.

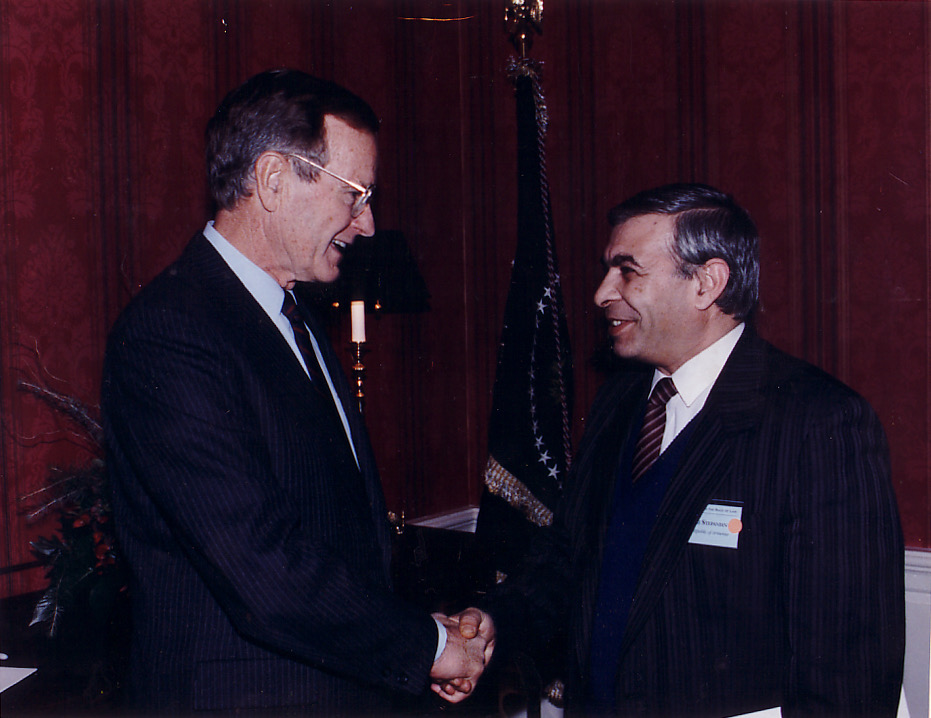
Vahe Stepanyan (right) meeting George H. W. Bush (left) in Washington D.C.

From June 2006 to May 2011, Stepanyan served as the head of staff of the Human Rights Defender's office of the Republic of Armenia. Thereafter, he served as head of chair of jurisprudence and its teaching methods at the Armenian State Pedagogical University.

Presently, Stepanyan is the head of chair of European and international law in the law department of Yerevan State University of Armenia. He concurrently holds several governmental positions, including the positions of an expert member of the Council of Justice of the Republic of Armenia (appointed by the President of the Republic of Armenia in July 2013), a member of the Investigative Committee of the Republic of Armenia (since 2014), and expert at the Legal Institute of the Ministry of Justice of the Republic of Armenia (since 2014).

Throughout his professional career, Stepanyan has cooperated with several international organizations, including the United Nations, Organization for Security and Co-operation in Europe, Cabinet Merlin/Icea and the World Bank. Stepanyan has also authored and co-authored several laws, multiple books and publications.

Stepanyan is married and has a son. His son, Simon Stepanyan, is an attorney in California, United States, and is the founder of Stepanyan Law Firm.
