= Special Investigative Service of Armenia =

Main investigating authority in Armenia

Special Investigative Service Հայաստանի Հանրապետության հատուկ քննչական ծառայություն

Agency overview
- Formed: 2007

Jurisdictional structure
- Governing body: Ministry of Justice

Operational structure
- Headquarters: Vagharsh Vagharshyan Street, Arabkir District, Yerevan
- Agency executive: Sasun Khachatryan, Chairman
- Parent agency: Government of Armenia

Website
- www.ccc.am/en/

The Special Investigative Service of Armenia (Armenian: Հայաստանի Հանրապետության հատուկ քննչական ծառայություն) is the main investigating authority in Armenia and operates as Armenia's anti-corruption agency answerable to the Prime Minister of Armenia. In its duties, it is considered to be an independent body "in its nature and also in its legislation". The current head is Sasun Khachatryan, who took office on 11 June 2018.

== History ==
The Special Investigation Service is relatively young agency in the system of law-enforcement agencies. It was effectively established on 28 November 2007 by the adoption of the Law "On Special Investigation Service" that was formally ratified by President Robert Kocharyan on 30 November 2007. It originally operated in the administrative building of Prosecutor General's Office, on a separate floor which ended up being insufficient for the activities of the Service. On 10 October 2014, President Serzh Sargsyan was present at the opening of the need building allocated for the Special Investigation Service.

== Structure ==
=== Special Forces ===
The Special Investigative Service of Armenia maintains a small tactical unit in order to not be dependent on other agencies. Very little is known about this special operations unit.

== List of leaders ==
- Vahram Shahinyan (-6 June 2018)
- Sasun Khachatryan (11 June 2018-present)

== See also ==
- Crime in Armenia
- National Security Service (Armenia)
- Police of Armenia
- Investigative Committee of Russia
