= Gyumri Technology Center =

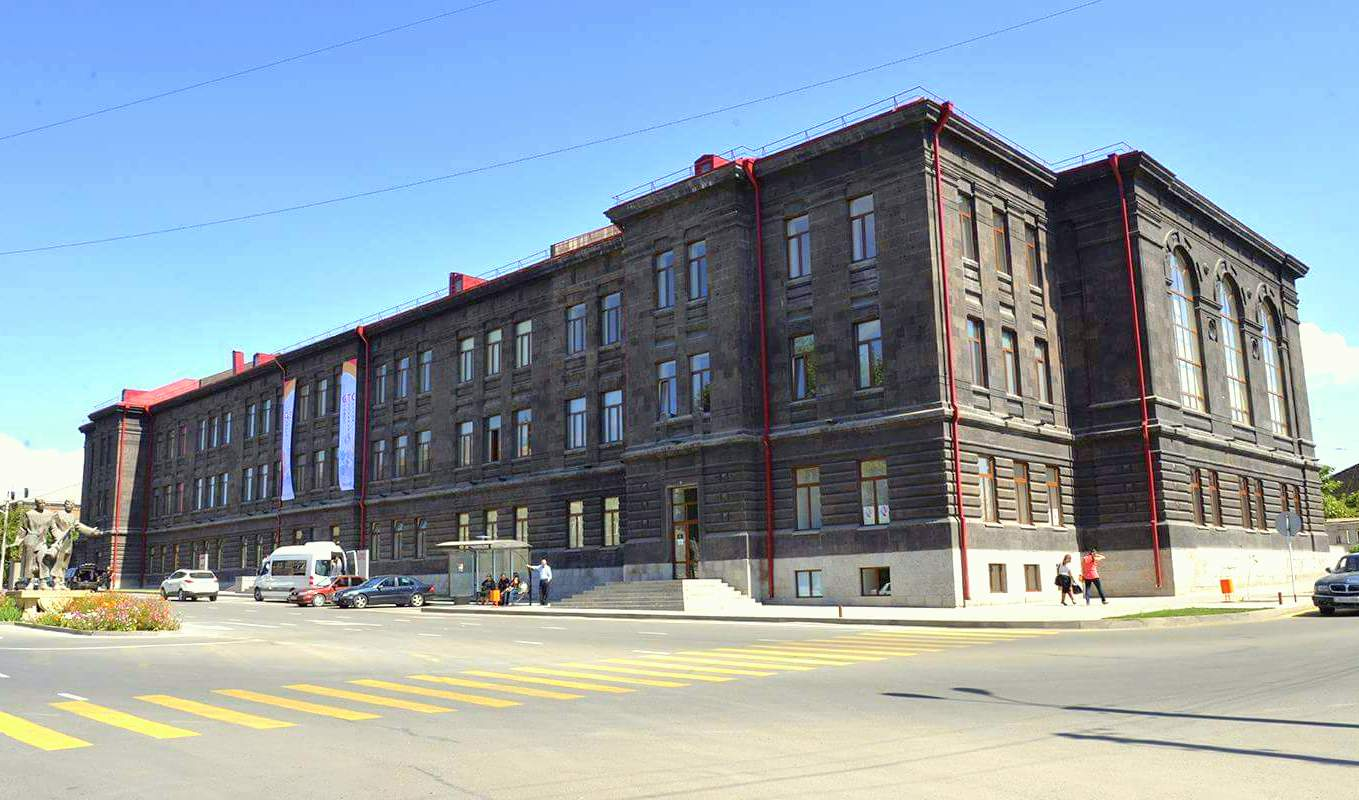
- Type: Public–private
- Established: 2014
- Affiliations: Ministry of Economy of Armenia, Enterprise Incubator Foundation, World Bank.
- Director: Bagrat Yengibaryan
- Location: Gyumri, Shirak Province, Armenia; 40°47′11″N 43°50′18″E
- Website: gtc.am

Gyumri Technology Center (formerly known as Gyumri TechnoPark; Armenian: Գյումրու տեխնոլոգիական կենտրոն), is a technological center for IT development in Gyumri, the second-largest city in Armenia. It was opened on 13 September 2014. The project aims at promoting the prosperity of the city of Gyumri, turning it into a technology zone with advanced IT infrastructures. The project is carried out by the Ministry of Economy of Armenia. US $ 1.7 million was allocated from the state budget to fulfill the project. The technological center was founded as a result of the cooperation between the Armenian government, Enterprise Incubator Foundation and the World Bank.

== Mission ==
The mission of Gyumri Technology Center is to turn Gyumri into a regional and international center of information and high technologies by creating new jobs, through trainings on engineering, multimedia, web, mobile and business skills. It is planned to train around 300 experts and 100 students per year in the centre.
