= List of political parties in Armenia =

This article lists political parties in Armenia. Armenia has a multi-party system with numerous political parties, who mostly work with each other to form coalition governments, with some parties having a history of changing in and out of government functions. As of January 2025, there are 123 political parties in Armenia which are registered with the Ministry of Justice.

== Parliamentary parties ==
Current political representation in the National Assembly following the 2021 Armenian parliamentary election:

| Name | Abbr. | Leader | Ideology | National Assembly | Political position | Alliance members |
|---|---|---|---|---|---|---|
| Civil Contract; Քաղաքացիական Պայմանագիր | KP; ՔՊ | Nikol Pashinyan | Liberalism; Reformism; Populism; Pro-Europeanism | 71 / 107 | Centre | Civil Contract |
| Civil Contract; Քաղաքացիական Պայմանագիր | KP; ՔՊ | Nikol Pashinyan | Liberalism; Reformism; Populism; Pro-Europeanism | 71 / 107 | Centre | United Labour Party |
| Armenia Alliance; Հայաստան դաշինք | HD; ՀԴ | Robert Kocharyan | Conservatism; Russophilia | 29 / 107 | Centre-left (fiscal); Right-wing (social) | ARF |
| I Have Honor Alliance; Պատիվ ունեմ դաշինք | PUD; ՊՈԴ | Artur Vanetsyan | Conservatism; Russophilia | 5 / 107 | Centre-right to right-wing | Republican Party |

== Extra-parliamentary major parties ==
The extra-parliamentary parties listed below have no seats in the current National Assembly, but had at least one seat since 2007:

| Name | Abbr. | Ideology |
|---|---|---|
| Armenian National Congress; Hay Azgayin Congres; Հայ Ազգային Կոնգրես | ANC; ՀԱԿ | Classical liberalism Market liberalism |
| Hanrapetutyun Party; Hanrapetut’yun kusakts’ut’yun Հանրապետություն կուսակցություն | HP; ՀԿ | Conservative; Pro-Europeanism |
| Heritage; Zharangutyun; Ժառանգություն Կուսակցություն | | Liberalism; Pro-Europeanism |
| Orinats Yerkir; Orinats Yerkir; Օրինաց Երկիր | OY; ՕԵԿ | Centrism; Pro-Europeanism |
| Prosperous Armenia; Bargavach Hayastan; Բարգավաճ Հայաստան | PAP; ԲՀԿ | Centre-right; Russophilia; Euroscepticism |
| Bright Armenia; Lyusavor Hayastan; Լուսավոր Հայաստան | BA; ԼՀԿ | Centrism; Pro-Europeanism |

== Other parties ==
Below is a list of other active political parties in Armenia:

| Name | Abbr. | Ideology |
|---|---|---|
| Adequate Party; Adekvad; Ադեկվադ | | Nationalist |
| All Armenian Labour Party; Համահայկական աշխատավորական կուսակցություն | | Social democratic |
| Apricot Country Party; Երկիր ծիրանի կուսակցություն | | Progressivism |
| Armenian Communist Party; Hayastani Komunistakan Kusaktsutyun; Հայաստանի Կոմունիստական Կուսակցություն | HKK; ՀԿԿ | Communist |
| Armenian Democratic Liberal Party; Ramkavar Azatakan Kusaktsutyun; Ռամկավար Ազատական Կուսակցություն | ADL; ՌԱԿ | Liberal |
| Armenian Liberal Party; Hayastani liberal kusakcut'yun Հայաստանի լիբերալ կուսակցություն | ՀԼԿ; ՀԼԿ | Liberal |
| Christian-Democratic Rebirth Party; Հայաստանի Քրիստոնեա Դեմոկրատական Շարժում | CDMA | Christian democracy |
| Citizen's Decision; Քաղաքացու որոշում | ՔՈ | Social democratic |
| Constitutional Rights Union; Sahmanatrakan Iravunk Miutiun; Սահմանադրական Իրավունք Միություն | SIM; ՍԻՄ | Conservative |
| Democratic Party of Armenia; Hayastani Demokratakan Kusaktsutyun; Հայաստանի Դեմոկրատական Կուսակցություն | ՀԴԿ | Socialist |
| Dignity, Democracy, Motherland | | Nationalist |
| Democratic Liberal Party; Ramkavar Azatakan Kusaktsutyun (Hayastan); Ռամկավար Ազատական Կուսակցություն (Հայաստան) | HRAK; ՌԱԿ(Հ) | Liberal |
| European Party of Armenia; Հայաստանի եվրոպական կուսակցություն | EPA | Pro-Europeanism |
| Free Democrats; Azat Demokratner; Ազատ Դեմորատներ կուսակցություն | ADK; ԱԴԿ | Liberal |
| Green Party of Armenia; Հայաստանի Կանաչների կուսակցություն | GPA | Green politics |
| Hayazn; Hayazn; Հայազն | Hayazn; Հայազն | Nationalist |
| Homeland Party; Հայրենիք կուսակցություն | | Center-right |
| Justice; Ardarutyun; Արդարություն | | Progressive |
| Law and Unity; Iravunk yev Miabanutyun; Իրավունք և Միաբանություն | | Conservative |
| Liberal Democratic Union of Armenia; Hayastani Zhoghovrdavarakan Azatakan Miutiun; Հայաստանի Ժողովրդավարական Ազատական Միություն | ՀԺԱՄ | Liberal |
| Mighty Fatherland; Hzor Hayrenik; Հզոր Հայրենիք | | Nationalist |
| National Agenda Party; Azgayin Orakarg Kusaktsutyun; Ազգային Օրակարգ Կուսակցություն | NAP; ԱՕԿ | Nationalist |
| National Democratic Union; Azgayin Zhoghoverdakan Miyutiun; Ազգային Ժողովրդավարական Միություն | NDU; ԱԺՄ | Conservative |
| National Progress Party of Armenia; Ազգային առաջընթաց կուսակցություն | NPP | Left-wing |
| National Security Party «Ազգային Անվտանգություն» Կուսակցություն | NSPA; ԱԱԿ | Social democratic |
| National Unity; Azgayin Miabanutyun; Ազգային Միաբանություն | | Conservative |
| New Country; Nor Yerkir; Նոր Երկիր | | Pro-Europeanism |
| New Times; Nor Zhamanakner; Նոր Ժամանակներ | | Centrist |
| One Armenia Party | | Centrist |
| ORO Alliance | | National liberalism |
| People's Party; Zhoghovrdakan Kusaktsutyun; Ժողովրդական Կուսակցություն | ԺԿ | Pro-Europeanism |
| People's Party of Armenia; Hayastani Zhoghovrdakan Kusaktsutyun; Հայաաստանի Ժողովրդական Կուսակցություն | ՀԺԿ | Socialist |
| Progressive United Communist Party of Armenia; Hayastani Arajadimakan Miyatsyal Kusaktsutyun; Հայաստանի առաջադիմական միացյալ կոմունիստական կուսակցություն | ՀԱՄԿ | Communist |
| Sasna Tsrer Pan-Armenian Party; Sasna Tsrer HamahaykakanKusaktsutyun; Սասնա Ծռեր Համահայկական կուսակցություն | STSK; ՍԾԿ | Nationalist |
| Social Democrat Hunchakian Party; Sotsyal Demokrat Hencakian Kusaktsutyun; Սոցիալ դեմոկրատ Հնչակյան կուսակցություն | SDHP; ՍԴՀԿ | Social democratic |
| Shant Alliance Nationalist Party; Shant Dashink Azgaynakan Kusaktsutyun; Շանթ Դաշինք Ազգայնական Կուսակցություն | SANP; ՇԴԱԿ | Tseghakronism |
| Unified Armenians Party; Miavorvats Hayer Kusaksutyun; Միավորված Հայեր կուսակցություն | | Pro-Europeanism |
| Union for National Self-Determination; Azgayin Ingnoroshum Miavorum Kusaktsutyun; Ազգային ինքնորոշում միավորում կուսակցություն | NSDU; ԱԻՄ | Nationalist |
| United Communist Party of Armenia; Hayastani Miatsyal Komunistakan Kusaktsutyun; Հայաստանի Միացյալ Կոմւնիստակն Կուսակցություն | | Communist |
| United Labour Party; Miavorvats Ashkhatankayin; Միավորված աշխատանքային կուսակցություն | | Social democracy |
| United Liberal National Party; Miatsyal Azatakan Azgayin Kusaktsutyun; Միացյալ Ազատական Ազգային Կուսակցություն | MIAK; ՄԻԱԿ | Liberal |

== Dissolved parties ==
The following political parties have been officially dissolved:

| Party | Abbr. | Ideology | Political position | Leader | Years active | Notes |
|---|---|---|---|---|---|---|
| Communist Party of Armenia; Հայաստանի Կոմունիստական Կուսակցություն | ՀԿԿ | Communism; Marxism–Leninism | Far-left | Aram G. Sargsyan | 1920–1991 | Historical party during the Soviet Union |
| Pan-Armenian National Movement; Հայոց Համազգային Շարժում | ՀՀՇ | Liberal democracy; Liberal nationalism; Anti-communism | Centre to centre-right | Aram Manukyan | 1988–2013 | Merged into Armenian National Congress |
| Democratic Liberal Party of Armenia; Հայաստանի Ռամկավար Ազատական Կուսակցություն | ՀՌԱԿ | Liberalism | | Harutyun Mirzakhanian | 1991–2012 | Merged into Democratic Liberal Party (Armenia) |
| Impeachment Union; Իմպիչմենթ դաշինք | | Populism | | Nikol Pashinyan | 2007–2008 | Merged into Armenian National Congress |
| Armenakan-Democratic Liberal Party; Արմենական-Ռամկավար Ազատական Կուսակցություն | | Liberalism | | Armen Manvelyan | 2009–2012 | Merged into Democratic Liberal Party (Armenia) |

== See also ==
- List of political parties in Artsakh
- Lists of political parties
- List of political parties in Eastern Europe
- Programs of political parties in Armenia
- Politics of Armenia
