= List of leaders of Armenia =

This is a list of leaders of Armenia from 1918 to the present. It includes leaders of the short-lived First Republic of Armenia (1918–1920), Soviet Armenia (1920–1991), and the post-Soviet government.

== Leaders of Armenia (1918–present) ==
=== (1918–1920) ===
==== Prime Minister of Armenia ====
No.	Portrait	Name (Birth–Death)	Term of office		Political party
No.	Portrait	Name (Birth–Death)	Took office	Left office	Political party
1		Hovhannes Kajaznuni (1868–1938)	30 June 1918	28 May 1919	ARF
2		Alexander Khatisian (1874–1945)	28 May 1919	5 May 1920	ARF
3		Hamo Ohanjanyan (1873–1947)	5 May 1920	25 November 1920	ARF
4		Simon Vratsian (1882–1969)	25 November 1920	2 December 1920	ARF
Armenia was part of the Soviet Union from 1920 to 1991 (see below)

=== Armenian Soviet Socialist Republic (1920–1991); part of the Transcaucasian Socialist Federative Soviet Republic (1922–1936) and the Soviet Union (1922–1991) ===
==== Leaders of the Communist Party of Armenia ====
The title of the leader of the party almost always was "First Secretary of the Central Committee of the Communist Party of Armenia".

No.	Picture	Name (Birth–Death)	Took office	Left office	Political party
First Secretary
1		Gevorg Alikhanyan (1897–1938)	December 1920	May 1921	CPA
General Secretary
2		Askanaz Mravyan (1885–1929)	May 1921	January 1922	CPSU
First Secretary
3		Ashot Hovhannisyan (1887–1972)	January 1922	6 July 1927	CPSU
4		Hayk Ovsepyan (1891–1937)	6 July 1927	8 April 1928	CPSU
5		Haykaz Kostanyan (1897–1938)	8 April 1928	7 May 1930	CPSU
6		Aghasi Khanjian (1901–1936)	7 May 1930	9 July 1936	CPSU
7		Amatuni Amatuni (1900–1938)	21 September 1936	23 September 1937	CPSU
8		Grigory Arutinov (1900–1957)	23 September 1937	28 November 1953	CPSU
9		Suren Tovmasyan (1909–1980)	28 November 1953	28 December 1960	CPSU
10		Yakov Zarobyan (1908–1980)	28 December 1960	5 February 1966	CPSU
11		Anton Kochinyan (1913–1990)	5 February 1966	27 November 1974	CPSU
12		Karen Demirchyan (1932–1999)	27 November 1974	21 May 1988	CPSU
13		Suren Harutyunyan (1939–2019)	21 May 1988	5 April 1990	CPSU
14		Vladimir Movsisyan (1934–2014)	5 April 1990	30 November 1990	CPSU
15		Stepan Pogosyan (1932–2012)	30 November 1990	14 May 1991	CPSU
16		Aram Sargsyan (1949–)	14 May 1991	7 September 1991	CPSU

=== Armenia (1991–present) ===
==== Chairman of the Supreme Council of Armenia ====
No.	Portrait	Name (Birth–Death)	Term of office		Political party
No.	Portrait	Name (Birth–Death)	Took office	Left office	Political party
1		Levon Ter-Petrosyan (born 1945)	4 August 1990	11 November 1991	PANM

==== Presidents of Armenia ====
No.	Name (Born)	Picture	Elected	Took office	Left office	Party
1	Levon Ter-Petrosyan (1945–)		1991; 1996	11 November 1991	3 February 1998	Pan-Armenian National Movement
2	Robert Kocharyan (1954–)		1998; 2003	9 April 1998	9 April 2008	Independent
3	Serzh Sargsyan (1954–)		2008; 2013	9 April 2008	9 April 2018	Republican Party
4	Armen Sarkissian (1952–)		2018	9 April 2018	1 February 2022	Independent
—	Alen Simonyan (1980–)		—	1 February 2022	13 March 2022	Civil Contract
5	Vahagn Khachaturyan (1959–)		2022	13 March 2022	Incumbent	Independent

=== Timeline ===
This is a graphical lifespan timeline of the leaders of Armenia. They are listed in order of first assuming office.

The following chart lists leaders by lifespan (living leaders on the green line), with the years outside of their tenure in beige.

The following chart shows leaders by their age (living leaders in green), with the years of their tenure in blue. The vertical black line at 35 years indicates the minimum age to be president.

== See also ==
- Politics of Armenia
