= 1998 Armenian presidential election =

- 16 March 1998 (first round); 30 March 1998 (second round)
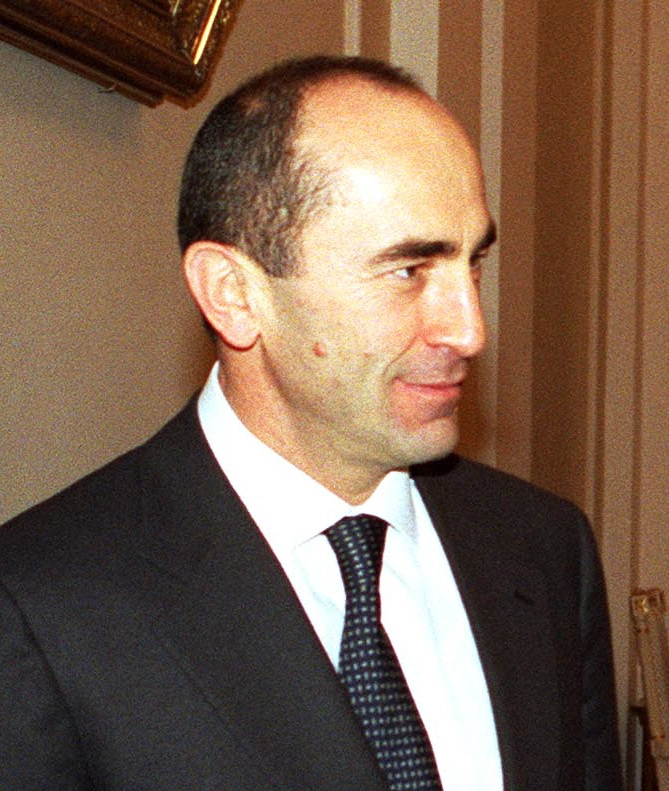

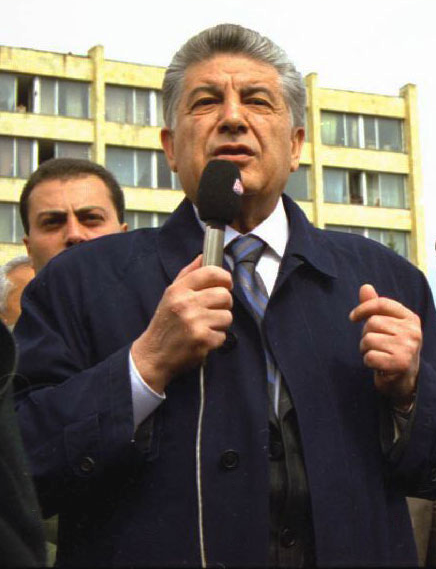
Nominee	Robert Kocharyan	Karen Demirchyan
Party	Independent	People's Party
Popular vote	908,613	618,764
Percentage	58.91%	40.12%
- Kocharyan: 50–60% 60–70% 70–80%
President before election
Levon Ter-Petrosyan
Elected President
Robert Kocharyan

Presidential elections were held in Armenia on 16 March 1998, with a second round on 30 March. The result was a victory for independent candidate Robert Kocharyan, who won 58.9% of the vote in the second round. Turnout was 63.5% in the first round and 68.1% in the second.

== Overview ==
The first round was held on 16 March 1998. Prime Minister and acting President Robert Kocharyan and Karen Demirchyan, the leader of Soviet Armenia from 1974 to 1988, won the most votes: 38.5% and 30.5% respectively. Demirchyan, who came in second, had been absent from politics for 10 years and had been in business.

Demirchyan was seen as a good old man from the Soviet times who could "return to the certainties of the past and distaste for mafia capitalism personified by Ter-Petrosyan's rule." Demirchyan was very popular among the Armenian public. A poll quoted by Western diplomats, showed that Demirchyan had the support of the 53% of Armenians, while Kocharyan was favored by only 36%. He was also preferable for the West, since he had more moderate approach to the Karabakh conflict, while Kocharyan was seen as more likely to take a hard line because of his deep connections with Karabakh (Kocharyan is a native of the region and was previously president of the Nagorno-Karabakh Republic). Demirchyan was also favored by Russian leaders, who considered Kocharyan an obstacle to the resolution of the Karabakh conflict. Russia's foreign minister Yevgeny Primakov openly endorsed Demirchyan, while Kocharyan was depicted by Russian television as "pro-Western" and "a radical."

The second round of the election was held on March 30 between Kocharyan and Demirchyan. Kocharyan won with 58.9% of the vote. The final results showed Demirchyan having only 40.1% of the vote. The British Helsinki Human Rights Group claimed that "ordinary Armenians turned to Robert Kocharian as someone untainted by mafia connections and the intrigues of Yerevan politics." The OSCE observation mission described the first round as "deeply flawed," while their final report stated that the mission found "serious flaws" and that the election did not meet the OSCE standards. Although Demirchyan didn't officially dispute the election results, he never accepted them and did not congratulate Kocharyan.

== Results ==
Candidate	Party	First round		Second round	
Candidate	Party	Votes	%	Votes	%
Robert Kocharyan	Independent	545,938	38.50	908,613	58.91
Karen Demirchyan	People's Party of Armenia	431,967	30.46	618,764	40.12
Vazgen Manukyan	National Democratic Union	172,449	12.16		
Sergey Badalyan	Armenian Communist Party	155,023	10.93		
Paruyr Hayrikyan	Union for National Self-Determination	76,212	5.37		
Davit Shahnazaryan	Independent	6,798	0.48		
Artashes Geghamyan	National Accord Party	6,314	0.45		
Vigen Khachatryan	Democratic Liberal Party	3,999	0.28		
Hrant Khachatryan	Constitutional Rights Union	2,943	0.21		
Aram G. Sargsyan	Democratic Party	2,710	0.19		
Yuri Mkrtchyan	Independent	2,511	0.18		
Ashot Bleyan	New Path	1,559	0.11		
Against all		9,509	0.67	14,890	0.97
Total		1,417,932	100.00	1,542,267	100.00
Valid votes		1,417,932	97.38	1,542,267	98.38
Invalid/blank votes		38,177	2.62	25,435	1.62
Total votes		1,456,109	100.00	1,567,702	100.00
Registered voters/turnout		2,293,636	63.48	2,300,816	68.14
Source: Nohlen et al.

=== Analysis ===
Hrant Mikayelian, researcher at the Caucasus Institute, estimated, based on turnout analysts, that actual results of the first round were as follows: Kocharyan at 32.6%, Demirchyan at 33.5%, Manukyan at 13.3% and Badalyan at 12%. As for the final result, Mikayelian estimated that Kocharyan would still win if no electoral violations took place, but with a smaller margin: 50.6% vs Demirchyan's 48.3%.
