= Dignified Way Party =

Dignified Way Party Արժանապատիվ ուղի կուսակցություն
- Leader: Hovhannes Margaryan
- Founded: 2018
- Headquarters: Gyumri
- Political position: Centre-right
- Slogan: 'A dignified way'

The Dignified Way Party (Armenian: Արժանապատիվ ուղի կուսակցություն) is an Armenian political party.

== History ==
The Dignified Way Party was founded on 1 November 2018 in Gyumri. Hovhannes Margaryan, a former member of the National Assembly and a former member of the Rule of Law party, was unanimously elected chairman of the party. The party intended to participate in the 2018 Armenian parliamentary election, but failed to register in time. The party has never participated in national elections. Prior to the election, the Dignified Future Party (an unrelated political party), petitioned the Ministry of Justice not to grant registration to the Dignified Way Party as the name was too similar to their own.

On 17 October 2021, the party participated in municipal elections in the city of Gyumri. Hovhannes Margaryan was the party's candidate for mayor. Following the election, the party received just 1.47% of the popular vote, failing to win any seats in the Gyumri city council.

The party currently acts as an extra-parliamentary force.

== Ideology ==
The party supports constitutional reform, upgrades to the pension system, protecting freedoms for media, and lowering homelessness and unemployment rates.

== See also ==
- Programs of political parties in Armenia
