= 1996 Armenian presidential election =

- 22 September 1996
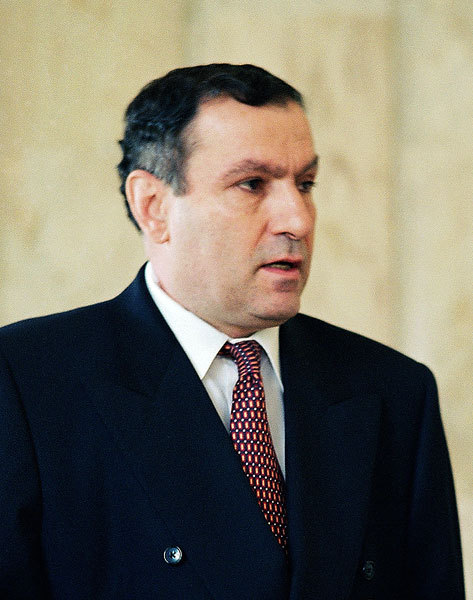

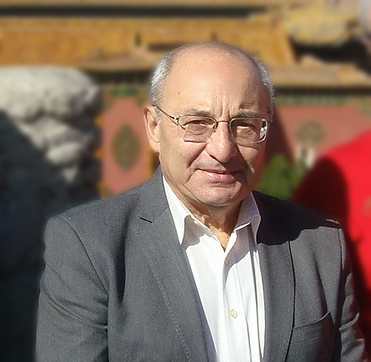

Nominee	Levon Ter-Petrosyan	Vazgen Manukyan	Sergey Badalyan
Party	HHSh	NDU	Communist
Popular vote	646,888	516,129	79,347
Percentage	51.34%	40.97%	6.30%
- Result by province
President before election
Levon Ter-Petrosyan
HHSh
Elected President
Levon Ter-Petrosyan
HHSh

Presidential elections were held in Armenia on 22 September 1996. The result was a victory for Levon Ter-Petrosyan, who received 51% of the vote. Turnout was 59%.

== Background ==
The 1996 presidential election was the second presidential election after Armenia's independence from the Soviet Union in 1991. On 18 September 1996, few days before the election, the influential defense minister Vazgen Sargsyan stated that he is "satisfied with the situation." Addressing Ter-Petrosyan's supporters, he proclaimed that Armenia "will enter the 21st century victoriously and stable with Ter-Petrosyan." The opposition parties (Armenian Revolutionary Federation, Paruyr Hayrikyan's Union for National Self-Determination, Aram Sargsyan's Democratic Party) consolidated around the former Karabakh Committee member and former prime minister Vazgen Manukyan.

== Conduct ==
Observation and monitoring organizations were mostly critical of the conduct of the elections. The OSCE observation mission found "serious violations of the election law."

== Results ==
Following the elections, both Ter-Petrosyan and Manukyan claimed victory. Official results by the Central Electoral Commission recorded Ter-Petrosyan's victory in the first round with just above 50% of the total vote in favor of the incumbent.

Candidate	Party	Votes	%
Levon Ter-Petrosyan	Pan-Armenian National Movement	646,888	51.34
Vazgen Manukyan	National Democratic Union	516,129	40.97
Sergey Badalyan	Armenian Communist Party	79,347	6.30
Ashot Manucharyan	Scientific-Industrial Civic Union	7,529	0.60
None of the above		10,012	0.79
Total		1,259,905	100.00
Valid votes		1,259,905	96.28
Invalid/blank votes		48,681	3.72
Total votes		1,308,586	100.00
Registered voters/turnout		2,210,189	59.21
Source: Nohlen et al.

=== Analysis ===
Hrant Mikayelian, researcher at the Caucasus Institute, noted that in precincts where turnout was lower than 64%, Manukyan received 50% of the vote while Ter-Petrosyan received 41%. Mikayelian notes that while it is clear that widespread falsifications took place, it is impossible to say with certainty that Manukyan actually received over 50% of the vote in the first round.

== Protests and aftermath ==
1996 Armenian protests
- Date: 23 September 1996 – 2 October 1996
- Location: Armenia
- Caused by: Alleged electoral fraud during the 1996 Armenian presidential election; Corruption
- Goals: Resignation of President Levon Ter-Petrosyan; New general elections
- Methods: Demonstrations
- Result: Protests suppressed by force

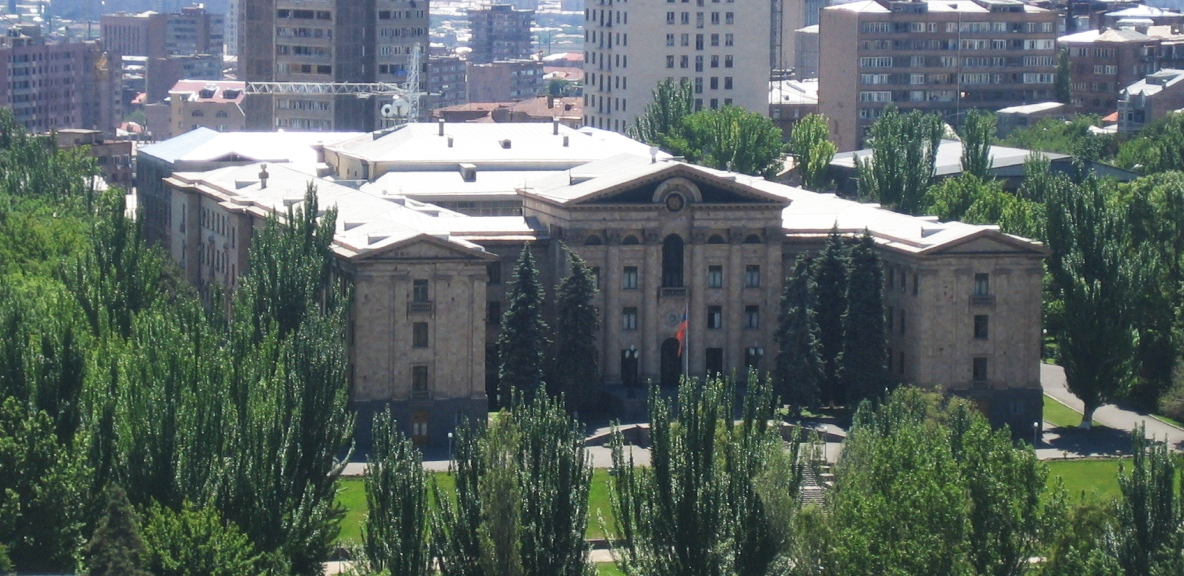
The National Assembly building in Yerevan

The leading opposition candidate Vazgen Manukyan officially received 41% of the vote. Claiming electoral fraud by the incumbent Ter-Petrosyan, Manukyan and his supporters began mass demonstrations in the afternoon of 23 September. An estimated 200,000 people gathered in Freedom Square to protest the election results. On 25 September, 150,000 to 200,000 of gathered in the same square in support of Manukyan. Manukyan led the demonstrators to Baghramyan Avenue, where the parliament building is located (the Electoral Commission was inside the building at the time). Later during the day, the protesters broke the fence surrounding the Armenian parliament and got into the building. They beat up the parliament speaker Babken Ararktsyan and vice-speaker Ara Sahakyan. The security forces were brought into Yerevan to restore order. On the same day, Defense Minister Vazgen Sargsyan stated that "even if they [the opposition] win 100 percent of the votes, neither the Army nor the National Security and Interior Ministry would recognize such political leaders." Sargsyan was later criticized by the West for this statement. Vazgen Sargsyan and Minister of National Security Serzh Sargsyan announced on public television that their respective agencies have prevented an attempted coup d'état. The government sent tanks and troops to Yerevan to enforce the ban on rallies and demonstrations on 26 September 1996. A number of opposition parliamentarians were stripped of legal immunity. Manukyan appealed to the Constitutional Court with a request for a new election, but it was rejected.

== Later developments ==
In December 1998, Vano Siradeghyan, one of Ter-Petrosyan's closest allies and interior minister at the time of the 1996 election, claimed in an interview that Ter-Petrosyan fell into a three-month depression following the election and wanted him and Vazgen Sargsyan to resign. According to Siradeghyan, "the whole state apparatus was demoralized, paralyzed and no government was formed during [the ensuing] three months." Siradeghyan also appeared to admit that government had resorted to vote-rigging to secure Ter-Petrosyan's victory without a runoff election. Siradeghyan left the position of interior minister in November 1996 and was appointed mayor of Yerevan, while Vazgen Sargsyan remained as defense minister after the election, despite rumors that he was to resign.

From 1995 until his resignation in February 1998, Ter-Petrosyan was criticized for his alleged authoritarian rule. History Professor Stephan H. Astourian of the University of California, Berkeley suggests that after crushing popular protest by "military force, legal recourse had been perverted, and a president had been elected fraudulently." Astourian claims that the elections "tarnished Ter-Petrosian's image, but the West did not dwell on the problem" as "a weak president has his uses." The West increased the pressure on the non-democratically elected president on the Karabakh issue. Astourian believes that "even more than his image in the West, it was the president's own self-image, his 'ego ideal,' that was tarnished."
