= Progressive United Communist Party of Armenia =

Progressive United Communist Party of Armenia Հայաստանի Առաջադիմական Միացյալ Կոմունիստական Կուսակցություն
- Leader: Vazgen Safaryan
- Headquarters: Yerevan
- Ideology: Communism; Marxism-Leninism
- Political position: Far-left

United Communist Party of Armenia (Armenian: Հայաստանի Առաջադիմական Միացյալ Կոմունիստական Կուսակցություն, abbreviated ՀԱՄԿ, Hayastani Arajadimakan Miatsial Komunistakan Kusaktsutyun) is a Marxist-Leninist political party in Armenia, established by Vazgen Safaryan.

== History ==
The party is one of the three Communist parties currently authorized in Armenia. However, the party has never had representation in the National Assembly.

Prior to the 2012 Armenian parliamentary election, it was rumored that the party would form a political alliance with the Armenian Communist Party. Although negotiations were held between the two parties, the Armenian Communist Party decided to run alone in the 2012 elections, and the United Communist Party decided not to participate.

The party did not participate in the 2018 Armenian parliamentary election.

== Ideology ==
Party leaders aimed at restoring the wealth and success of Armenia during Soviet times and were in favor of free education, free medical care, and developing the production and industrial sectors of the economy.

== See also ==
- Programs of political parties in Armenia
- Politics of Armenia
