= Alternative Party (Armenia) =

Armenian political party

Alternative Party Այլընտրանքային կուսակցություն
- Leader: Edgar Arakelyan
- Founded: 2018
- Headquarters: Yerevan
- Ideology: Anti-corruption
- National Assembly: 0 / 107

The Alternative Party (Armenian: Այլընտրանքային կուսակցություն, romanized: Aylyntrank’ayin kusakts’ut’yun) is a political party in Armenia.

== History ==
The Alternative Party was founded on 20 October 2018, during a founding congress held in Yerevan. Edgar Arakelyan, a former member of the Rule of Law party, was elected as Chairman. Arakelyan left the Rule of Law party following the 2018 Armenian revolution in order to establish a new political party and participate in future elections.

The party announced its intentions to participate in the 2018 Armenian parliamentary elections. Prior to the election, the party stated that they would be open to joining a political alliance, however, the party ultimately did not partake in the election.

During the 2022 Armenian protests, Arakelyan stated that opposition forces were corrupt.

The party does not maintain any representation within the National Assembly and currently acts as an extra-parliamentary force.

== Ideology ==
The party announced its principal task will be to eliminate all forms of corruption in Armenia. The party also supports the development of the economy and the protection of social and human rights in the country, as well as strengthening ties with the Armenian diaspora.

== See also ==
- Programs of political parties in Armenia
