= 2016 Armenian local elections =

Local elections were held in Armenia on 17 April 2016.

== Results ==
=== Hrazdan ===
Aram Danielyan reelected mayor of Hrazdan.

Candidate	Party	Votes	%
Aram Danielyan	Republican Party of Armenia	12,510	52.09
Sasun Miqayelyan	Civil Contract	10,267	42.75
Artur Misakyan	Armenian Renaissance (RoL)	1,237	5.15
Total		24,014	100.00
Valid votes		24,014	96.73
Invalid/blank votes		813	3.27
Total votes		24,827	100.00
Registered voters/turnout		44,338	55.99
Source: CEC
