= 2012 Armenian parliamentary election =

Parliamentary election in Armenia

- 6 May 2012
- All 131 seats in the National Assembly; 66 seats needed for a majority
Party	Leader	Vote %	Seats	+/–
Republican	Serzh Sargsyan	44.12	62	+3
PAP	Gagik Tsarukyan	30.19	35	+10
ANC	Levon Ter-Petrosyan	7.10	7	New
Heritage	Raffi Hovannisian	5.78	5	−2
ARF	Vahan Hovhannisyan	5.68	5	−11
Orinats Yerkir	Artur Baghdasaryan	5.52	6	−4
Hanrapetutyun	Aram Sargsyan	–	2	+2
HHSh		–	1	+1
Independents	–	–	8	−5
This lists parties that won seats. See the complete results below.
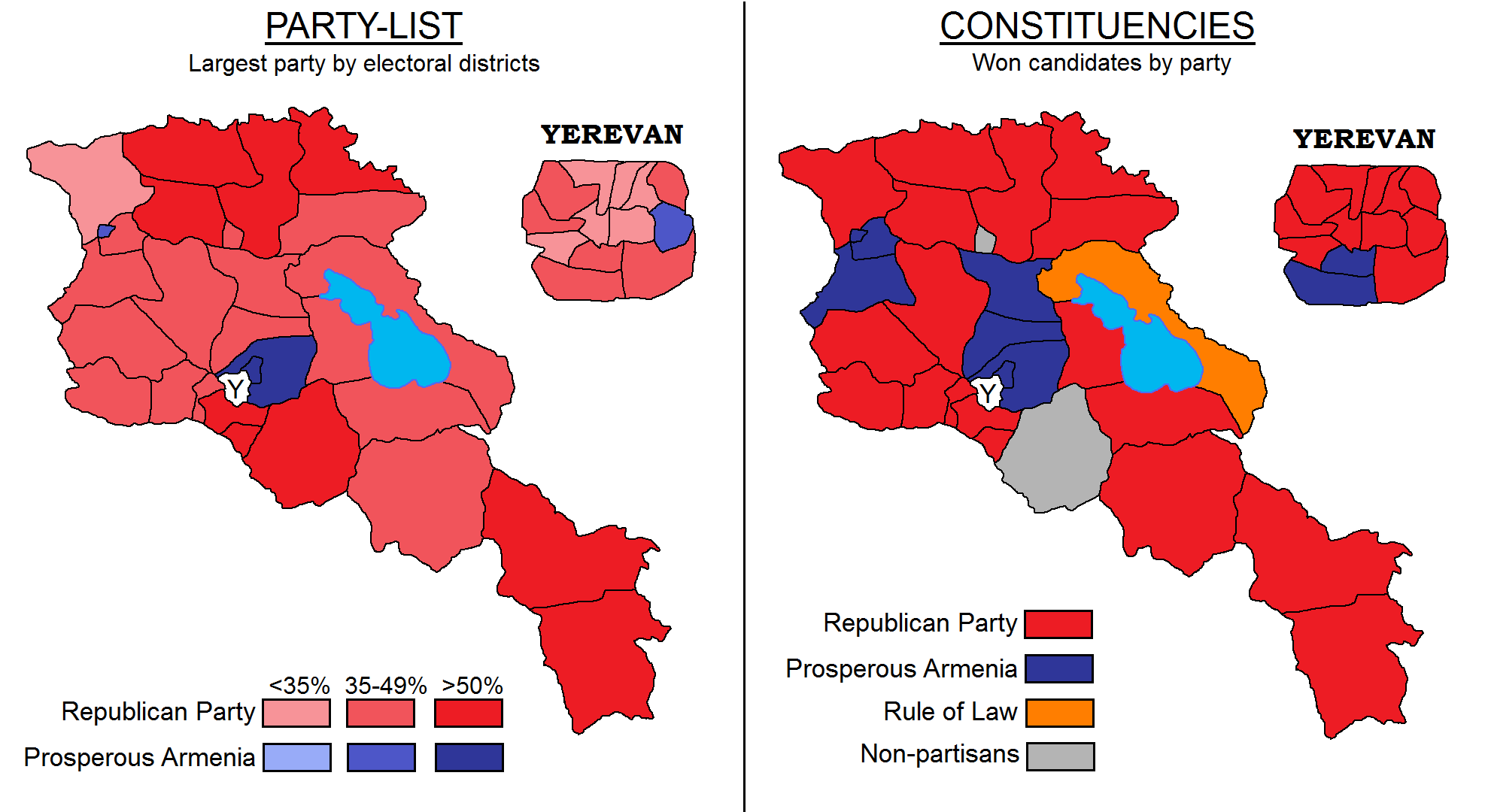
Prime Minister before	Elected Prime Minister
Tigran Sargsyan; Republican	Tigran Sargsyan; Republican

Parliamentary elections were held in Armenia on 6 May 2012. President Serzh Sargsyan's ruling Republican Party gained more majority of the parliament seats. Armenia's wealthiest man Gagik Tsarukyan's Prosperous Armenia came second with about one fourth of the seats, while ANC, ARF, Rule of Law and Heritage won less than 10 percent each.

== Background ==
In 2011, Armenia faced unprecedented opposition protests over the disputed 2008 presidential election, amongst other issues. Since then changes welcomed by the EU have been made, who stated that "the next parliamentary and presidential elections will be an important benchmark in Armenia reform's path."

=== Electoral system and controversy over it ===
Out of a total of 131 seats in the National Assembly, 90 are distributed between parties using a proportional system, while the other 41 are elected from constituencies by a majoritarian voting system. The election threshold is 5% for parties and 7% for alliances, in this case the only alliance was the Armenian National Congress.

Months before the election, there was a movement for the elimination of constituency seats and going to a full party-list proportional system. Most parties, including 3 of 5 parliamentary parties (ARF, PAP and Heritage), supported this initiative bringing up the issue of "district authorities" which were traditionally backed up by the Republican Party. The opposition bloc Armenian National Congress also supported it.

On February 28, Heritage and ANC joined the ARF protests in front of the National Assembly building, but on February 28, the National Assembly voted 30-54 against the proposal.

== Parties ==
A total of 9 parties have been registered to participate in the election:

1. Prosperous Armenia - Gagik Tsarukyan
2. Heritage - Raffi Hovannisian
3. Armenian National Congress - Levon Ter-Petrosyan
4. Armenian Revolutionary Federation - Vahan Hovhannisyan
5. Democratic Party of Armenia - Aram Sargsyan
6. Armenian Communist Party - Ruben Tovmasyan
7. Republican Party of Armenia - Serzh Sargsyan
8. Unified Armenians Party - Ruben Avagyan
9. Rule of Law - Artur Baghdasaryan

== Constituency candidates ==
There a total of 41 electoral districts in Armenia, 13 in capital Yerevan and 28 in provinces each varying around 50,000 voters. 139 candidates have been registered in 41 districts to run for constituency seats. 54 were non-partisans candidates and the opposition bloc Armenian National Congress has the most 38 candidates.

Biggest interest was given to the 7th district which includes Malatia-Sebastia district of Yerevan, where the opposition alliance Armenian National Congress candidate Nikol Pashinyan is going to challenge RPA-backed oligarch Samvel Aleksanyan. Other notable candidates are Ruben Hayrapetyan, the president of the Football Federation of Armenia in 1st district of Avan and one the wealthiest Armenian businessman Gagik Tsarukyan (PAP leader) in 28th district which includes Abovyan city and surrounding villages.

The full list of constituency candidates in Armenian is available here.

Edmon Marukyan was the only non-partisan candidate who was elected to the National Assembly. In 2015 he created Bright Armenia party.

== Campaign ==
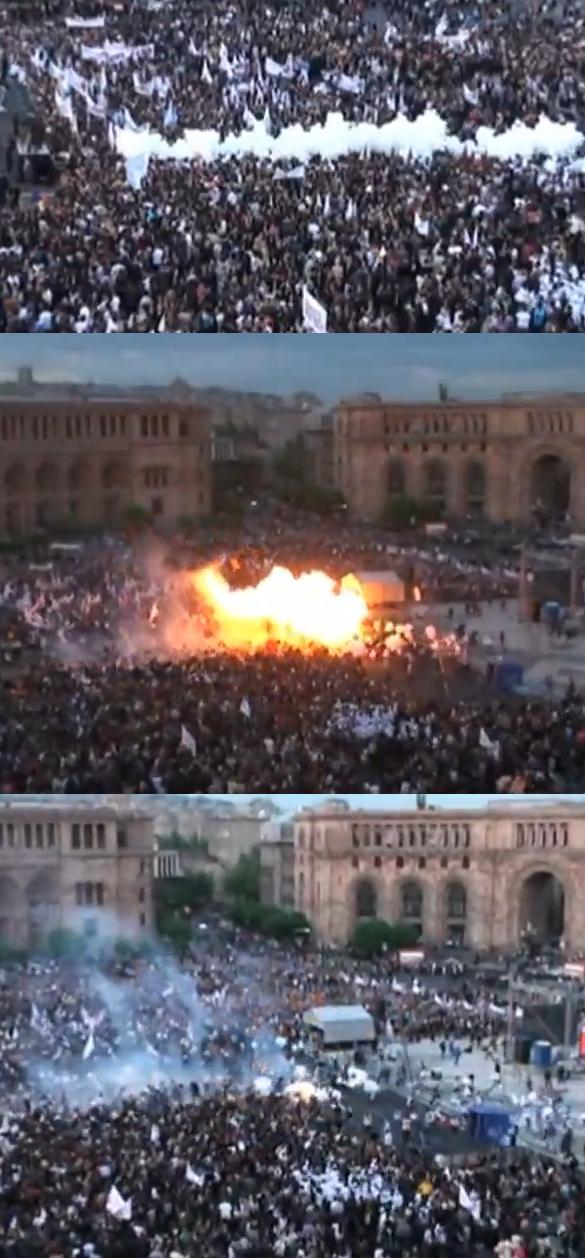
The incident

On 19 March the Heritage party introduced its proportional list, which also included some members of the Free Democrats party as of their agreement to participate together in this election.

The official election campaign began on 8 April, but the first campaigns were on 10 April due to Easter. None of the participating parties held campaign rallies on 24 April, the Armenian Genocide Remembrance Day. ARF, ANC Heritage, Republican Party, Prosperous Armenia and the Communist Party attended a memorial at Tsitsernakaberd.

On 5 May, the day before the election is "Day of Silence", when most kinds of campaigning are prohibited by law.

=== Balloon explosion incident ===
On 4 May the last official day of the campaign, during the Republican Party concert and rally in Republic Square of Yerevan, dozens of balloons filled with hydrogen exploded, resulting in the injury of at least 144 people according to the Ministry of Emergency Situations. A few hours later it was reported that out of total 154 people hospitalized, 98 were still in hospitals and 28 were in intensive-care units.

== Oversight ==
=== Joint headquarters of PAP, ANC and ARF ===
On 6 April four parties (Prosperous Armenia, Heritage, ARF and ANC) created joint headquarters with a view to holding free and fair elections. Although, Prosperous Armenia is in a coalition with RPA and RoL, they also agreed to join the opposition manifest. On 19 April Heritage withdrew from this agreement announcing that it was not formed to control the election, but rather as a pre-election campaign headquarters for the ex-president Robert Kocharyan's comeback into Armenia's political life and probable participation in the 2013 presidential election.

On 28 April the Armenian Revolutionary Federation (9 MPs) and Prosperous Armenia (21 MPs) appealed to the Constitutional Court to rule unconstitutional articles that prohibits the publication of the lists of voters that actually took part in the election. Although, Heritage deputies didn't sign the appeal, party leader Raffi Hovhannisyan said that they also support that initiative. Vahe Grigoryan, the lawyer that represents the appeal, said that the Constitutional Court is "going to make a choice between rationality and dictation [from the authorities]". Levon Zurabyan, the ANC speaker, said that each party will have up to 5-6 representatives at each polling station. Also, the parties have agreed to create joint 'mobile' groups that will respond to all reports about election fraud by traveling to the given precinct to study and eliminate the vote rigging.

The Constitutional Court heard the case on 5 May, the day before the election and refused the appeal.

=== Local ===
31,451 observers from local non-governmental organizations were registered to oversight the election. The largest ones were the "Panarmenian Youth Association" (Համահայկական երիտասարդական ասոցիացիա) with 5,555 observers, "The Choice is Yours" (Ընտրությունը քոնն է) with 4,000 observers, "Free Society Institute" (Ազատ հասարակության ինստիտուտ) with 2,512 observers and "The Fist" (Բռունցք) with 2,136 observers. Other organizations had less than 2,000 observers.

=== International ===
647 international observers were registered by the Central Electoral Commission. Largest missions were:

- OSCE Office for Democratic Institutions and Human Rights - 258 observers
- CIS Mission of Observers - 151 observers
- OSCE Parliamentary Assembly - 69 observers

== Opinion polls ==
Source	Date of Polling	RP	PA	RoL	ARF	Heritage	ANC	Others	Other answers (DK, Und, RtA)
Hetq Online	as of 5 May 2012	10	11	2	25	11	28	9	4
European Friends of Armenia (EuFoA)	Apr 17–22, 2012	33.3	26	3.4	3.2	4.0	2.9	2.9	24.3
Gallup International Association	Apr 17–23, 2012	27.4	20.9	4.2	3.7	4.4	8.5	0.7	30
VTsIOM	Apr 4–13, 2012	32	27	5	4	4	3	2	23
Gallup International Association	Apr 4–10, 2012	34	28	4.5	4.6	3.5	6.7	-	18.7
"My Opinion" Civil Initiative	Mar 27, 2012	8	39	-	13	4	26	-	10
Sociometer	Mar 26, 2012	40	35	5-6	6-7	5-6	8-9	-	-
European Friends of Armenia (EuFoA)	Feb 25 – Mar 5, 2012	24.5	27.1	3.0	3.3	2.6	3.2	2.6	32.1
"500 Voices" Social Research Group	Feb 14, 2012	9	36	-	12	5	27	-	11
Research Center of Political Developments	Feb 6, 2012	34	21	2	3	7	13	-	20

=== Exit poll ===
The Gallup International Association held an exit poll among 22,410 people in 131 polling stations. 46.35% refused to answer, while 56.65% answered as follows: 43.3% Republican Party of Armenia, 29.3% Prosperous Armenia, 6.4% Armenian National Congress, 6.5% Heritage, 6.2% Rule of Law, 5.2% Armenian Revolutionary Federation, 2.2% Armenian Communist Party, 0.6% Democratic Party of Armenia, 0.4% Unified Armenians Party.

== Results ==
Party	Proportional			Constituency			Total seats	+/–
Party	Votes	%	Seats	Votes	%	Seats	Total seats	+/–
Republican Party of Armenia	664,440	44.12	40	509,117	35.66	22	62	+3
Prosperous Armenia	454,673	30.19	28	231,112	16.19	7	35	+10
Armenian National Congress	106,903	7.10	7				7	+7
Heritage	86,998	5.78	5	32,845	2.30	0	5	–2
Armenian Revolutionary Federation	85,550	5.68	5	34,410	2.41	0	5	–11
Orinats Yerkir	83,123	5.52	5	87,312	6.12	1	6	–4
Armenian Communist Party	15,899	1.06	0	6,262	0.44	0	0	0
Democratic Party of Armenia	5,577	0.37	0				0	0
Unified Armenians Party	2,945	0.20	0				0	0
Hanrapetutyun Party				60,427	4.23	2	2	+2
Pan-Armenian National Movement				53,881	3.77	1	1	+1
People's Party				8,351	0.58	0	0	0
Liberal Party of Armenia				5,513	0.39	0	0	New
Democratic Way Party				5,145	0.36	0	0	0
Democratic Fatherland Party				4,732	0.33	0	0	New
Marxist Party of Armenia				2,372	0.17	0	0	0
Social Democrat Hunchakian Party				1,236	0.09	0	0	0
Independents				384,950	26.96	8	8	–5
Total	1,506,108	100.00	90	1,427,665	100.00	41	131	0
Valid votes	1,506,108	96.55		1,427,665	94.91			
Invalid/blank votes	53,831	3.45		76,643	5.09			
Total votes	1,559,939	100.00		1,504,308	100.00			
Registered voters/turnout	2,523,101	61.83		2,464,888	61.03			
Source: Central Electoral Commission of Armenia, CLEA

== Reactions ==
=== Parties ===
- Republican Party of Armenia - RPA speaker Eduard Sharmazanov announced that this election was the best one held in Armenia in the 21st century. Later, he added that the society is "satisfied with its results".
- Prosperous Armenia - PAP leader Gagik Tsarukyan thanked everyone for supporting them and stated that popular support is the most important thing for him.
- Armenian National Congress - The ANC did not recognize the legitimacy of the election.
- Armenian Revolutionary Federation - on 8 May ARF released a statement which said that the election did not "record the will of people".
- Heritage - On 8 May the party announced that they do not recognize the legitimacy of the election and that mass violations dramatically changed the results.
- Rule of Law - RoL leader, Artur Baghdasaryan stated that this election was the first time done without ballot stuffing and brawling. Also, the calculation of the votes was under complete control of parties.

=== International ===
- European Union: Foreign Policy Chief Catherine Ashton's statement about the election said that the EU welcomes the efforts of the Armenian authorities to hold "more transparent and competitive elections", however a number of issues kept the election away from internationally recognized democratic standards.
- OSCE: The OSCE/ODHIR recognized the election as "competitive and largely peaceful, but shortcomings undermined confidence in the process". They also said that the campaign environment generally respected freedoms of assembly and expression and candidates were, mostly, able to campaign freely. But the general lack of confidence in the integrity of the process amongst political parties and the general public is an issue of great concern.
- United States: During her visit to Armenia, Secretary of State Hillary Clinton said that "despite certain shortcomings, the elections were compliant with international standards". Clinton also stated that she was "pleased at the reports from international monitors about Armenia’s parliamentary elections last month being generally competitive and inclusive".

== Claims of electoral irregularities ==
The joint headquarters of ANC, PAP and ARF reported about the oxidation of the ink stamped in passports of voted citizens, which were done to avoid multiple voting by same citizens.

ANC, ARF and Heritage criticized the authorities for abusing the administrative resource in favor of the ruling party. Both said the elections were marred by widespread vote buying schemes and other violations that influenced the outcome of the vote.

On 11 May the joint headquarters of ANC, ARF and Prosperous Armenia stated that the election "doesn't reflect the real image of the popular support of political forces".

== Aftermath and protests ==
On an interview on 6 May, election day, Levon Ter-Petrosyan, answering to a question about probable post-election protests, said that they will appeal every electoral violation "in all legal means". Then he continued, that he's not sure how successful it would be, but, in former cases the opposition forces have been working separate and that this time the forces are tripled in the joint headquarters of the ANC, PAP and ARF.

On 7 May, the Armenian National Congress announced that they will hold a demonstration in Freedom Square on 8 May. During the last demonstration of ANC, Levon Zurabyan, the ANC speaker, said that they will meet again on 8 May and summarize the election and together with the protesters will discuss their future moves.

Two days after the 2012 parliamentary election, about 5,000 supporters of ANC marched in the streets of Yerevan denouncing "fraud" and calling for the election results to be thrown out. Levon Ter-Petrosyan and other ANC leaders said President Serzh Sargsyan had rigged the election and demanded new polls. International monitors said the election was peaceful, but criticised "interference" by the ruling party, which it said violated election law in the run-up to the vote.

The ANC leaders addressing thousands on Freedom Square, claimed that the vote giving the ruling RPA a majority in National Assembly does not reflect the real lineup of political forces in the country. Armenian Times editor Nikol Pashinyan stressed that the opposition bloc will not give up the seven mandates and will enter parliament and continue its daily fight to change the political situation. Although, Levon Ter-Petrosyan said that who would not pick his mandate, because it's not appropriate for a former president become an MP. Later he said that bribery, repeated ballot, voter list fraud and other violations were widespread during the election. Another ANC leading member, Aram Manukyan said have evidence of violations committed by the authorities, especially of inflating voter lists, tampering with stamps and ink, pressure on voters and candidates’ proxies and others. He then added that they will appeal the outcome of the elections at the Constitutional Court.

On 18 May the Armenian National Congress applied to the Constitutional Court demanding the cancellation of proportional-system election results. On 31 May the Constitutional Court rejected the appeal.

On 26 June second demonstration of the Armenian National Congress after the 6 May election took place at Freedom Square of Yerevan. Levon Ter-Petrosyan stated that if Prosperous Armenia wants to become a serious political force, they should not support President Sargsyan in upcoming presidential election.
