= Mighty Fatherland =

Mighty Fatherland Հզոր Հայրենիք
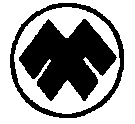
- Leader: Shirak Torosyan
- Founder: Vardan Vardapetyan
- Founded: 1999
- Headquarters: Yerevan
- Ideology: Liberal democracy
- Political position: Centre-right

Mighty Fatherland, also known as Mighty Homeland or Powerful Homeland (Armenian: Հզոր Հայրենիք, romanized: Hzor Hayrenik) is a political party in Armenia. The founder of the party was Vardan Vardapetyan, but since 2006 has been led by the vice-chairman of the party, Shirak Torosyan. Torosyan is also the President of the Javakhk Patriotic Union.

== History ==
The party was founded in 1999 by Armenians from the Javakheti region of Georgia.

The party participated in the 1999 Armenian parliamentary election, winning 2.30% of the popular vote, but failed to win any seats in the National Assembly.

Following the 2003 Armenian parliamentary election, the party won 3.30% of the popular vote, failing to gain any political representation. Meanwhile, the party endorsed Robert Kocharyan in the 2003 Armenian presidential election.

Shirak Torosyan decided to run in the 2007 Armenian parliamentary election as part of the Republican Party of Armenia's candidate list, winning a single seat in the National Assembly.

Prior to the 2008 Armenian presidential election, the party endorsed Serzh Sargsyan from the Republican Party.

In the 2012 Armenian parliamentary election, the party nominated Stepan Margaryan, to run under Prosperous Armenia's electoral list, while Shirak Torosyan was under the Republican Party's.

Prior to the 2018 Armenian parliamentary election, the party announced that it would no longer endorse the Republican Party of Armenia. Shirak Torosyan announced his support for Nikol Pashinyan. Following Torosyan's statement, the Republican Party decided to cut all ties with Torosyan. Torosyan participated in the 2018 elections as a non-partisan candidate with the My Step Alliance.

Shirak Torosyan announced his intention to participate in the 2021 Armenian parliamentary elections under Nikol Pashinyan's Civil Contract electoral list.

== Ideology ==
The party supports fostering stronger ties between Armenia and the Armenian Diaspora as well as strengthening the economic development of the country. In October 2017, prior to the signing of the Armenia–EU Comprehensive and Enhanced Partnership Agreement, Shirak Torosyan stated, "Armenia will have the possibility of comprehensive relations with the EU in economy, trade, and a number of other areas, which are fixed in the document. This will become a new impetus to build a new type of relationship with the West. This is a major achievement in the field of foreign policy."

== See also ==
- Politics of Armenia
- Programs of political parties in Armenia
