= 1999 Armenian parliamentary election =

Parliamentary election in Armenia

- 30 May 1999
- All 131 seats in the National Assembly; 66 seats needed for a majority
Party	Leader	Vote %	Seats	+/–
Unity Bloc	Vazgen Sargsyan	41.45	62	+1
Communist	Sergey Badalyan	12.04	10	0
Law and Unity		7.93	7	New
ARF		7.79	8	+7
Orinats Yerkir	Artur Baghdasaryan	5.25	6	New
NDU		5.14	6	+1
Independents		–	32	−40
This lists parties that won seats. See the complete results below.

Parliamentary elections were held in Armenia on 30 May 1999. There were 75 constituency seats and 56 elected on a national basis using proportional representation. The result was a victory for the Unity Bloc, which won 62 of the 131 seats.

== Results ==
Party	Proportional			Constituency			Total seats	+/–
Party	Votes	%	Seats	Votes	%	Seats	Total seats	+/–
Unity Bloc (HZK–HHK)	448,133	41.45	29			33	62	+61
Armenian Communist Party	130,161	12.04	8			2	10	0
Law and Unity Bloc	85,736	7.93	6			1	7	New
Armenian Revolutionary Federation	84,232	7.79	5			3	8	+7
Orinats Yerkir	56,807	5.25	4			2	6	New
National Democratic Union	55,620	5.14	4			2	6	+1
Dignified Future	35,190	3.25	0			0	0	New
Union of Communist and Socialist Parties	26,823	2.48	0			0	0	New
Mighty Fatherland	24,896	2.30	0			0	0	New
Union for National Self-Determination	24,681	2.28	0			0	0	–3
Motherland Bloc	13,293	1.23	0			0	0	New
Pan-Armenian National Movement	12,540	1.16	0			0	0	–62
Freedom Party	11,076	1.02	0			0	0	New
Democratic Party	10,621	0.98	0			0	0	0
Mission	8,122	0.75	0			0	0	0
Armenian Democratic Liberal Party	7,374	0.68	0			0	0	–4
Free Hayk Mission	6,526	0.60	0			0	0	New
Nation State	5,785	0.54	0			0	0	0
Youth Party of Armenia	5,675	0.52	0			0	0	New
Bloc of Socialist Forces and Intellectuals	2,588	0.24	0			0	0	New
Shamiram	2,053	0.19	0			0	0	–8
Independents						32	32	–40
None of the above	23,314	2.16	–				–	–
Total	1,081,246	100.00	56			75	131	–59
Valid votes	1,081,246	95.09						
Invalid/blank votes	55,887	4.91						
Total votes	1,137,133	100.00						
Registered voters/turnout	2,198,544	51.72						
Source: Central Electoral Commission, IPU
