= Dignity, Democracy, Motherland =

- Leader: Armen Darbinyan
- Founded: 2003
- Headquarters: Yerevan
- Ideology: Nationalism

The Dignity, Democracy, Motherland (Armenian: Արժանապատվություն, ժողովրդավարություն, հայրենիք) was a nationalist political alliance in Armenia.

== History ==
The alliance was established in 2003 between the Dignified Future Party and the People's Democratic Party. The alliance nominated Armen Darbinyan as its chairman.

The alliance nominated 71 candidates to participate in the 2003 Armenian parliamentary election. Following the election, the party won 2.8% of the popular vote but failed to win any seats in the National Assembly.

The Dignified Future Party, and its leader Lyudmila Harutyunyan, accused Armen Darbinyan of trying to seize power of her party and blamed Darbinyan for the failure of the alliance in the 2003 elections. While, Gagik Aslanyan, the Chairman of the People's Democratic Party, opted to merge his party with Orinats Yerkir. As a result, the Dignity, Democracy, Motherland alliance had officially dissolved shortly afterwards.

== Ideology ==
The alliance sought to strengthen democracy, contribute to the development of the socio-economic life of citizens, economic growth, and to support legitimate elections and an accountable parliament.

== See also ==
- Programs of political parties in Armenia
