= 1995 Armenian parliamentary election =

- 5 July 1995
- All 190 seats in the National Assembly; 96 seats needed for a majority
Party	Leader	Vote %	Seats
Republic Bloc		43.9	88
Shamiram		17.4	8
Communist	Sergey Badalyan	12.4	10
NDU		7.7	5
UNSD		5.7	3
Ramgavar		2.6	1
ARF		–	1
Independents	–	–	72
This lists parties that won seats. See the complete results below.

Parliamentary elections were held in Armenia on 5 July 1995, with a second round on 29 July. There were 150 constituency seats and 40 elected on a national basis using proportional representation. The result was a victory for the Republic Bloc (an alliance of the Pan-Armenian National Movement, Democratic Liberal Party, Christian Democratic Union and the Republican Party of Armenia), which won 88 of the 190 seats. Overall voter turnout was 54.3%. Following the election, the Republic Bloc and the Shamiram party formed a coalition government.

== Results ==
Party	Proportional			Constituency			Total seats	+/–
Party	Votes	%	Seats	Votes	%	Seats	Total seats	+/–
Republic Bloc (Note: The Republic Bloc parties ran separately in the constituency elections, with Pan-Armenian National Movement winning 62 seats, the Democratic Liberal Party winning 4, the Christian Democratic Union winning one and the Republican Party of Armenia also winning one.)	329,000	43.9	20			68	88	New
Shamiram	130,252	17.4	8			0	8	New
Armenian Communist Party	93,353	12.4	6			4	10	–126
National Democratic Union	57,996	7.7	3			2	5	New
Union for National Self-Determination	42,987	5.7	3			0	3	New
Ramgavar	19,437	2.6	0			1	1	New
Will and Dashnaksutiun	15,424	2.1	0			0	0	New
Armenian Agrarian Democratic Party	13,784	1.8	0			0	0	New
Armenian Democratic Party	13,784	1.8	0			0	0	New
Mission	10,428	1.6	0			0	0	New
Armenian Scientific-Industrial Civil Union	9,940	1.3	0			0	0	New
Nation State	8,397	1.1	0			0	0	New
People's Party	6,706	0.9	0			0	0	New
Armenian Revolutionary Federation						1	1	New
Independents						72	72	+13
None of the above							–	–
Vacant						2	2	–
Total			40			150	190	–69
Valid votes	771,830	65.21						
Invalid/blank votes	411,743	34.79						
Total votes	1,183,573	100.00						
Registered voters/turnout	2,178,699	54.32						
Source: Nohlen et al.
