= Union of Armenian Social Democrats =

Armenian social democratic organization

The Union of Armenian Social Democrats (Armenian: Հայ Սոցիալ-Դեմոկրատների Միություն, Hay Sotsial-Demokratneri Miut'yun, abbreviated ՀՍԴՄ, HSDM), also known as the League of Armenian Social Democrats, was the first Armenian Iskraist social democratic organization.

== History ==
The HSDM was founded in Tiflis in 1902 by Stepan Shaumian, Melik Melikian, Ashot Khoumerian, Assadour Kakhoyan, Bogdan Knunyants, and Arshak Zubarian. The party's manifesto, which adhered to proletarian internationalism, was printed in the first and only edition of its newspaper Proletariat in October 1902. Vladimir Lenin hailed the positions of the HSDM on the national question, but criticized its federalist demands. In March 1903, the HSDM merged into the Caucasus Organization of the Russian Social Democratic Labour Party.

== See also ==
- Armenian Soviet Socialist Republic
- Communist Party of Armenia (Soviet Union)
