= 2018 Armenian parliamentary election =

- 9 December 2018
- All 132 seats in the National Assembly; 67 seats needed for a majority
- Turnout: 48.62%
Party	Leader	Vote %	Seats	+/–
My Step Alliance	Nikol Pashinyan	70.44	88	+83
PAP	Gagik Tsarukyan	8.26	26	−5
Bright Armenia	Edmon Marukyan	6.37	18	+15
This lists parties that won seats. See the complete results below.
Prime Minister before	Prime Minister after
Nikol Pashinyan (acting); Civil Contract (Way Out Alliance)	Nikol Pashinyan; Civil Contract (My Step Alliance)

Snap parliamentary elections were held in Armenia on 9 December 2018, as none of the parties in the National Assembly were able to put forward and then elect a candidate for Prime Minister in the two-week period following the resignation of incumbent Prime Minister Nikol Pashinyan on 16 October. They were the first elections after the 2018 revolution and the country's first-ever snap elections.

The result was a landslide victory for Pashinyan's My Step Alliance, which received 70% of the vote and won 88 of the 132 seats in the National Assembly.

== Electoral system ==
The 101 members of the National Assembly are elected by party-list proportional representation. Seats are allocated using the d'Hondt method with an election threshold of 5% for parties and 7% for multi-party alliances. However, at least three political forces will pass into parliament regardless of the performance of the third best performing party or alliance.

The ballot paper has two sections; one of which is a closed list of candidates for the party at the national level and the other an open list of candidates for the constituency (of which there are 13) that the voter is voting in. Voters vote for a party at the national level and can also give a preference vote to any of the candidates for the same party in a district list. Seats are allocated to parties using their national share of the vote, with half awarded to those on the national list and half to those who receive the most preference votes on the district lists. Four seats are reserved for national minorities (Assyrians, Kurds, Russians and Yazidis), with parties having separate lists for the four groups. A gender quota requires at least 25% of a list to be male or female, and nationwide lists can't include more than three consecutive members of the same gender.

If a party receives a majority of the vote but wins less than 54% of the seats, they will be awarded additional seats to give them 54% of the total. If one party wins over two-thirds of the seats, the losing parties will be given extra seats reducing the share of seats of the winning party to two-thirds. If a government is not formed within six days of the preliminary results being released, a run-off round between the top two parties must be held within 28 days. The party that wins the run-off will be given the additional seats required for a 54% majority, with all seats allocated in the first round preserved.

=== Proposed changes ===
Before its resignation, the government submitted a bill to the National Assembly proposing modifications to the electoral system. These included lowering the thresholds for parties and electoral alliances to 4% and 6%, respectively, minimum representation of four political forces in the parliament (provided the fourth strongest receives at least 2% of the votes), abolition of open lists of candidates from 13 regional constituencies leaving only nationwide closed lists and introduction of TV debates. The bill sought to raise the minimum representation of each gender from 25% to 30% of the seats on a party list. On 22 October, a vote was held on the bill. Most members of the Republican Party (RPA) boycotted the vote; this meant that there were not enough MPs present to pass the bill into law (63). The final vote was 56 in favour, three against. RPA deputy chairman Armen Ashotian insisted that the electoral system must not be changed less than two months before the elections, as this would amount to "building democracy in the country with undemocratic methods". The Pashinyan government submitted the bill to parliament a second time, and it was discussed on 29 October. Once again, the bill failed to receive enough votes, and as a result the election took place according to the legislation created by the RPA-era government.

== List of participating parties and alliances ==
Parties and electoral alliances were required to inform the CEC of their participation in the election and submit the corresponding documents by 6:00 pm on 14 November. In total, nine parties and two alliances (listed below in accordance with their number on the ballot paper) participated in the election:

#	Party	Ideology	Founded	Leader
1	Republican Party of Armenia	National conservatism	1990	Vigen Sargsyan
2	Citizen's Decision	Social democracy, environmentalism, direct democracy	2018	Suren Sahakyan
3	Armenian Revolutionary Federation	Armenian nationalism, democratic socialism	1890	Armen Rustamyan
4	My Step Alliance (Civil Contract, Mission Party)	Big tent, reformism, anti-corruption	2015 and 2013	Nikol Pashinyan
5	Bright Armenia	Liberalism, pro-Europeanism	2015	Edmon Marukyan
6	Christian-Democratic Rebirth Party	Christian democracy, social market economy	2018	Levon Shirinyan
7	National Progress Party of Armenia	Social liberalism	2018	Lusine Haroyan
8	We Alliance (Free Democrats and Hanrapetutyun Party)	Liberalism, pro-Europeanism	2011 and 2001	Aram Sargsyan
9	Orinats Yerkir	Liberal conservatism, pro-Europeanism	1998	Artur Baghdasaryan
10	Sasna Tsrer Pan-Armenian Party	Armenian nationalism, pro-Europeanism, atlanticism, anti-Russian	2018	Varuzhan Avetisyan
11	Prosperous Armenia	Conservative liberalism, Euroscepticism	2004	Gagik Tsarukyan

== Declined participation or failed to register ==
The following parties declined to participate in the election or failed to register: Alternative Party, Armenian Communist Party, Armenian Democratic Liberal Party (Ramgavar), Armenian National Congress, Dignified Future, Dignified Way Party, Democratic Party of Armenia, European Party of Armenia, For Social Justice, Green Party of Armenia, Heritage, Social Justice Party, Liberal Democratic Union of Armenia, National Agenda Party, National Democratic Union, People's Party of Armenia, Unified Armenians Party, Union for National Self-Determination, Yerkir Tsirani (Apricot Country Party).

== Criticism ==
Some politicians and analysts criticized the date of the election based on the fact that an amended Electoral Code was not passed by the parliament. Paruyr Hayrikyan, the leader of Union for National Self-Determination, expects the elections to be "antidemocratic".

Vazgen Manukyan, the leader of National Democratic Union, said while they were preparing for elections in spring, elections in December were too close prepare for. He also said that they "do not consider that the hasty elections will promote the establishment of stable political field".

Aram Gaspar Sargsyan, leader of the Democratic Party of Armenia, has declared that the DPA is abstaining from participation in the election, amidst concerns that, because of Pashinyan's failure to rewrite the RPA-era electoral code, new authorities will likely exploit the current version over the electoral code with amendments. He also stated, that "this election will be the same charade as in 2017".

Some critics believed that the current legislation favored the Republican Party of Armenia in the previous parliamentary election. The country's former ruling party, commanded a majority in the National Assembly prior to the elections, initially called for elections to take place in summer 2019 in order to give the parties time to prepare for elections and make amendments to Armenia's electoral code.

== Campaign ==
Campaigning began on 26 November 2018.

=== Debates ===
Acting Prime Minister of Armenia Nikol Pashinyan proposed to form a tradition of holding live pre-election debates involving the top figures of all forces participating in the elections.

On 28 November, vice chairman of the Republican Party Vigen Sargsyan invited Pashinyan to take part in a live TV debate but the proposal was turned down by Pashinyan.

Leaders of all eleven participating parties took part in a live debate that was hosted by Armenian Public Television on 5 December.

=== Alleged violations ===
==== Independent reports ====
On 28 November, it was reported that a working group set up by Human Rights Defender of Armenia revealed several violations, such as using insults and intolerance to influence others' opinions.

Former Ombudsman Larisa Alaverdyan said that black PR has been used from the first days of the campaign, and called on all participants to move to a positive field. Also she mentioned that unlike in previous years, the early start of campaign is not regarded as a violation of law by the CEC.

Also on 28 November, newspaper Zhamanak reported that in Yerevan some posters of Bright Armenia party had been torn down and replaced with My Step Alliance posters.

==== Claimed by campaign participants ====
On 27 November, the Republican Party said that some of the acting PM's statements during the election campaign were clear examples of hate speech.

== Endorsements ==
My Step Alliance

- Sos Janibekyan, actor

Sasna Tsrer

- Hasmik Papian, soprano
- Ara Papian, former diplomat

We Alliance

- Aram Abrahamyan, editor of Aravot

== Opinion polls ==
Poller	Date of Polling	My Step (Civil Contract)	Bright Armenia	Yelk	RPA	PAP	ARF	Sasna Tsrer	Heritage
Gallup International/MPG	December 1–4, 2018	69.4	3.8	—	1.3	5.7	1.2	1.4	—
Gallup International/MPG	November 17–21, 2018	68.3	1.2	—	1.5	6.7	1	0.9	—
IRI	October 9–29, 2018	67	10	—	2	9	2	3	<1
IRI	July 23–August 15, 2018	with Yelk		66	4	13	2	—	1
Gallup International/MPG	May 4–9, 2018	with Yelk		75	3.8	3.2	1.9	—	0.4

== Electoral Assistance ==
In response to a formal request from the Government of Armenia, the European Union as well as the Governments of Germany, the United Kingdom, and Sweden agreed to provide financial and electoral assistance prior to and during the election.

The US Embassy in Armenia also announced that the United States and USAID would provide financial assistance and collaboration with the Government of Armenia ahead of the parliamentary elections, including the September 2018 signing of an $8.6 million, four-year agreement to support the integrity of Armenian elections.

== Monitoring ==
OSCE/ODIHR will conduct a large-scale observation mission. Observers from the OSCE Parliamentary Assembly and the Parliamentary Assembly of the Council of Europe (PACE) will join the observation mission later. There will be over 200 short-term observers.

Observers from all four factions of the Russian parliament will also take part in the monitoring.

Voting at 1,500 polling stations (where over 90% of voters are registered) out of 2010 will be broadcast live.

Head of the European Union permanent delegation to Armenia, ambassador Piotr Switalski has declared that Armenia has managed to achieve the highest standards of freedom of speech following the Velvet Revolution. According to the diplomat, the country now ensures freedom of expression and assembly. Switalski said he hopes it will be possible to minimize hate speech during the election campaign.

== Results ==
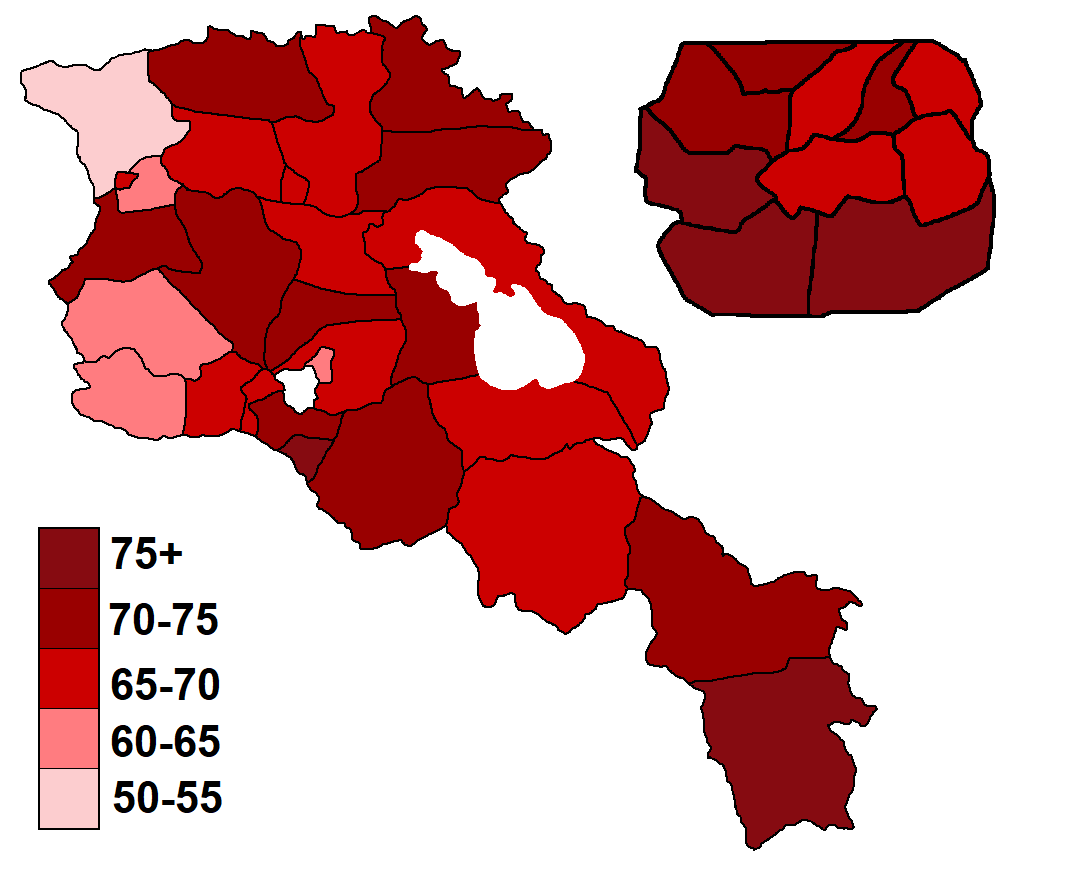
Percentage of votes won by Pashinyan's My Step Alliance by electoral district

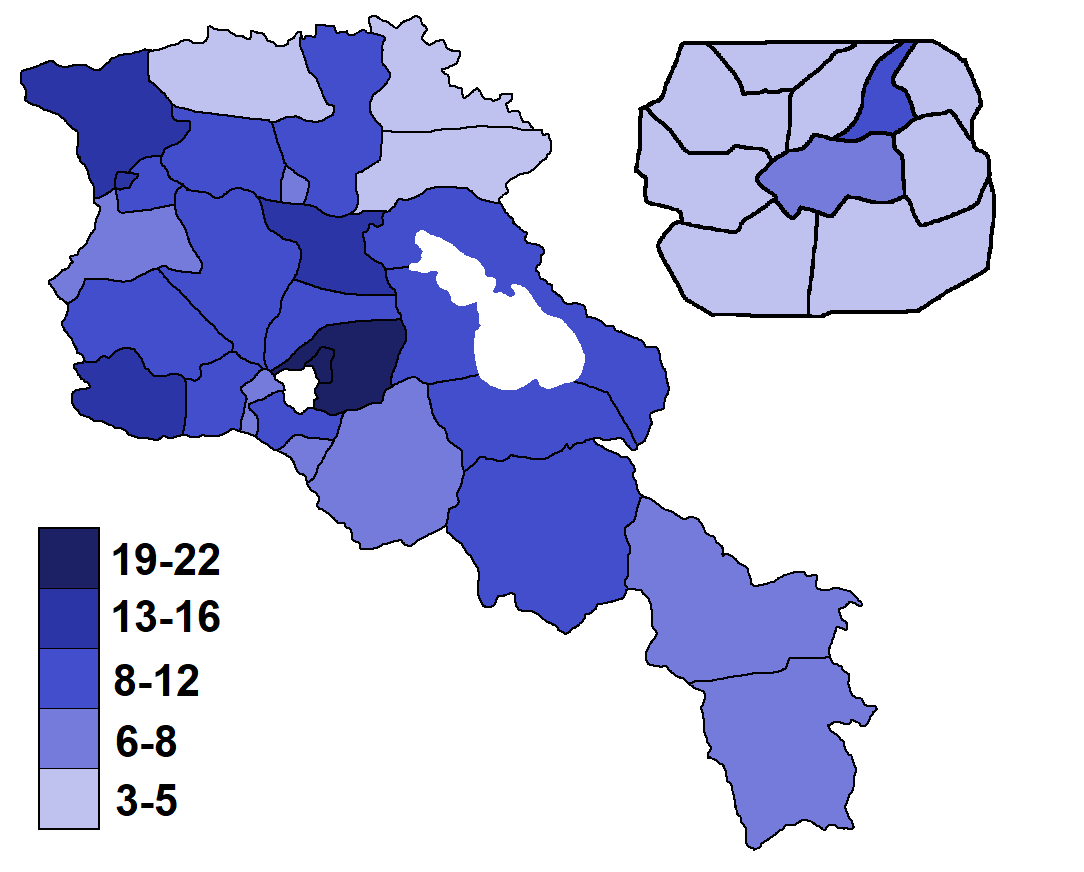
Percentage of votes won by Prosperous Armenia by electoral district

Turnout was 48.62%, 12 percent lower than the 2017 elections.

All the four seats reserved for national minorities (Assyrians, Kurds, Russians and Yazidis) were won by My Step Alliance.

The result was somewhat ironic for the Republican Party, as even though they would have lost seats regardless, if the electoral reform law they had boycotted earlier in the year had been allowed to move forward, they would have successfully exceeded the new 4% threshold for parties and obtained seats. Instead, they failed to reach the current 5% threshold, and received no seats.

Party	Votes	%	Seats	+/–
My Step Alliance	884,864	70.44	88	+83
Prosperous Armenia	103,801	8.26	26	–5
Bright Armenia	80,047	6.37	18	+15
Republican Party	59,083	4.70	0	–58
Armenian Revolutionary Federation	48,816	3.89	0	–7
We Alliance	25,176	2.00	0	–1
Sasna Tsrer	22,868	1.82	0	New
Orinats Yerkir	12,393	0.99	0	0
Citizen's Decision	8,514	0.68	0	New
Christian-Democratic Rebirth Party	6,458	0.51	0	New
National Progress Party	4,121	0.33	0	New
Total	1,256,141	100.00	132	+27
Valid votes	1,256,141	99.63		
Invalid/blank votes	4,706	0.37		
Total votes	1,260,847	100.00		
Registered voters/turnout	2,593,140	48.62		
Source: CEC

=== By electoral district ===
Electoral district	RPA	CDP	ARF	My Step	BAP	CDRP	NPP	WE	OY	ST	PAP
1 - Yerevan Districts Avan, Nor Nork & Kanaker-Zeytun	6.96%	0.91%	2.24%	70.16%	7.94%	0.81%	0.42%	1.48%	1.04%	2.35%	5.70%
2 - Yerevan Districts Ajapnyak, Arabkir & Davtashen	7.99%	1.12%	2.61%	70.28%	7.32%	0.66%	0.32%	1.99%	0.93%	2.58%	4.21%
3 - Yerevan Districts Malatia-Sebastia & Shengavit	4.37%	1.07%	1.50%	76.83%	7.39%	0.62%	0.38%	1.62%	1.11%	1.87%	3.24%
4 - Yerevan Districts Erebuni, Kentron, Nork-Marash & Nubarashen	6.47%	0.95%	2.17%	71.10%	7.53%	0.70%	0.34%	1.93%	0.70%	2.49%	5.62%
5 - Ararat	6.40%	0.35%	2.45%	72.60%	3.91%	0.33%	0.23%	2.47%	1.42%	1.68%	8.15%
6 - Armavir	2.56%	0.37%	3.91%	67.11%	8.45%	0.39%	0.24%	3.25%	0.48%	1.69%	11.55%
7 - Aragatsotn	2.09%	0.82%	6.32%	68.97%	6.69%	0.25%	0.23%	1.16%	1.82%	1.45%	10.20%
8 - Gegharkunik	2.76%	0.27%	7.05%	70.75%	4.74%	0.26%	0.36%	2.14%	1.46%	1.60%	8.61%
9 - Lori	7.07%	0.29%	2.53%	69.33%	8.14%	0.33%	0.20%	0.83%	1.26%	1.79%	8.23%
10 - Kotayk	3.54%	0.43%	4.16%	67.71%	3.55%	0.66%	0.58%	1.19%	0.48%	1.23%	16.47%
11 - Shirak	2.93%	0.30%	6.47%	65.86%	8.13%	0.64%	0.12%	1.79%	0.89%	2.09%	10.78%
12 - Vayots Dzor and Syunik	3.22%	0.70%	4.70%	72.60%	4.64%	0.55%	0.38%	3.63%	0.52%	1.17%	7.88%
13 - Tavush	2.38%	1.94%	7.27%	73.92%	3.50%	0.31%	0.49%	3.02%	1.06%	1.43%	4.68%
Source: CEC

== Reactions ==
Local

Catholicos Karekin II congratulated all parties, called the outcome of the elections a "milestone" and stated that he was praying for successes of the new Parliament.

International

- European Union: The EU stated that, "These elections were held with respect for fundamental freedoms and enjoyed broad public trust that needs to be preserved through further electoral reforms. The European Union is committed to a stable, democratic and prosperous future of Armenia. The early parliamentary elections were important in terms of enhancing public trust towards the electoral process in Armenia. We expect all stakeholders to continue concerted efforts towards further democratisation and modernisation of the country."
- Council of Europe: The Council of Europe commented that, "As a result of the democratic elections held in Armenia, the Government and the Parliament of Armenia won the citizens’ full confidence and mandate." The CoE further welcomed the steps taken by the Government of Armenia to implement radical reforms in the judicial-legal sphere and went on to note that they expect Armenia and the CoE to discuss further steps and actions of bilateral cooperation.
- Organization for Security and Co-operation in Europe: "The early parliamentary elections in Armenia were held with respect for fundamental freedoms and enjoyed broad public trust that needs to be preserved through further electoral reforms, the OSCE international observers concluded. The media environment is diverse and the freedom of expression, guaranteed by the Constitution, was respected."
- United Nations: The United Nations praised this year's peaceful transition of power following the elections and urged the country's new leadership to stay the course in pursuing a strengthened democratic system based on human rights, a culture of dialogue and strong independent institutions.
- United States: The Department of State congratulated the people of Armenia on the conduct of the elections.

== See also ==
- Elections in Armenia
- Politics of Armenia
- Programs of political parties in Armenia
- 2018 Armenian presidential election
