= Samvel Aleksanyan =

Armenian politician

- Սամվել Ալեքսանյան
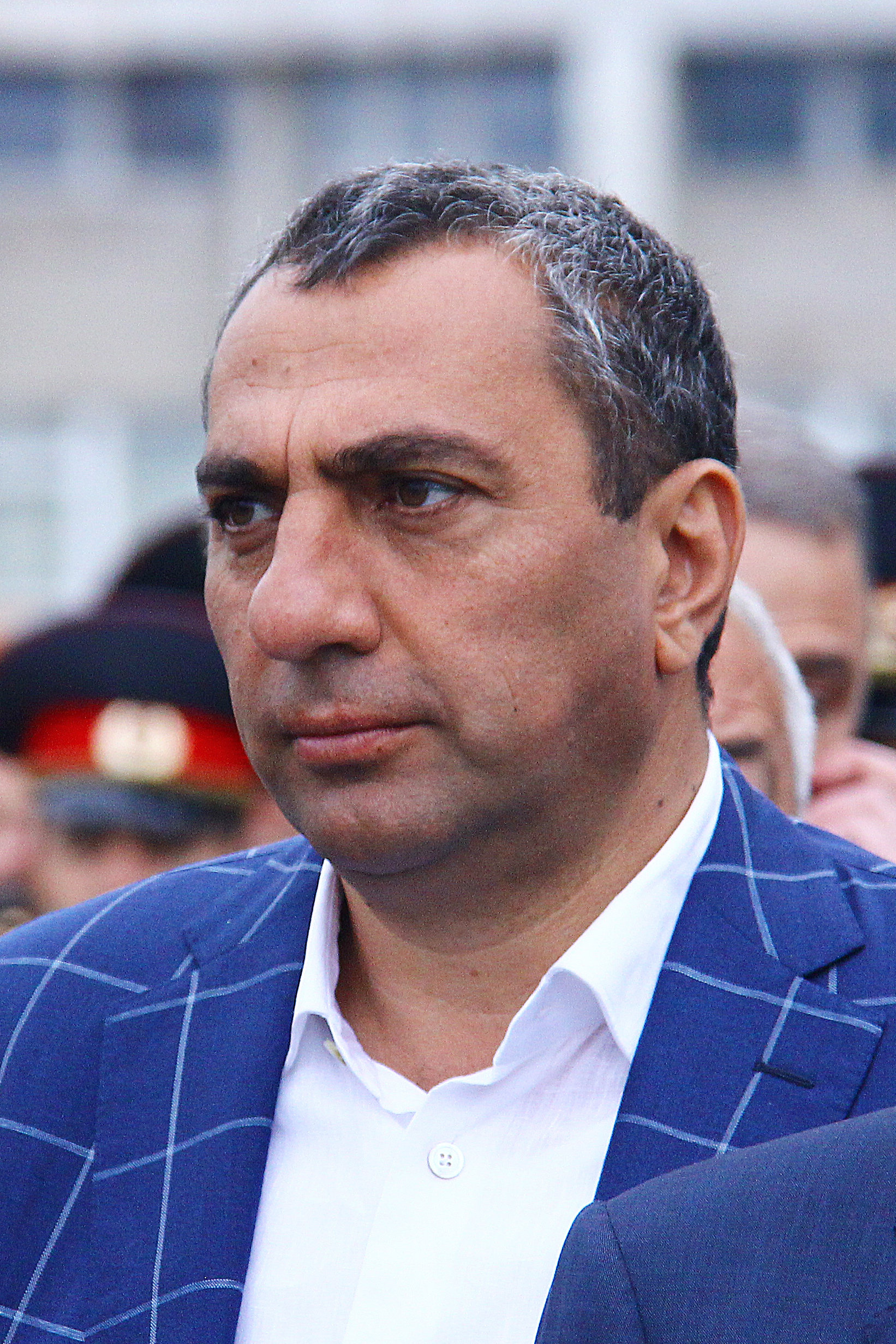
- Aleksanyan in 2013

Member of the National Assembly of Armenia

Personal details
- Born: August 19, 1968 (age 58) Yerevan, Soviet Union
- Citizenship: USSR; Armenia
- Party: Republican Party of Armenia
- Spouse: Shogherina Mkrtchyan
- Children: 7
- Occupation: politician
- Awards: 2nd degree
- Nickname: Lfik Samo

Samvel Limindri Aleksanyan (Armenian: Սամվել Լիմինդրի Ալեքսանյան; born August 19, 1968, Yerevan, Armenian SSR), former deputy of the National Assembly of Armenia, oligarch and businessman.

== Biography ==
Samvel Aleksanyan was born on August 19, 1968, in Yerevan. He attended Yerevan School No. 112 and served in the Soviet army from 1988 to 1990. In 1990, he worked as a skilled worker in a factory producing sanitation technologies. In 1993, he was head of a production unit of metal constructions. For the past decade, he has had his own business. From 2003-2007, he was a deputy in the NA. He was a member of the NA Standing Committee on Financial-Credit, Budgetary and Economic Affairs. He was a member of the parliament from the Republican Party that has been in power for almost fifteen years.

He is married and has seven children.

== Business activity ==
Although the Armenian Constitution prohibits members of the National Assembly from engaging in business activities, Aleksanyan owns several large companies. In the 2013 "Declaration of Assets by High-Ranking Officials" published by the Ethics Commission of High-Ranking Officials, Aleksanyan declared assets totaling 4,123,000,000 drams, while his wife declared 15,103,450,000 drams in registered property. Some newspapers have questioned these figures, suggesting they are significantly understated.

Aleksanyan is also Armenia's "sugar oligarch" who controls the import of this staple. In addition to being one of the largest food importers, he also owns a large supermarket chain. Aleksanyan's economic interests are said to be one of the major obstacles for Carrefour's operations in Armenia. One of the most recent news analyses indicates that "the key concern of Armenian oligarchs is that Carrefour is an importer of some goods and can undermine their monopolies by selling goods at low prices".

=== "Yerevan City" chain of supermarkets ===
Aleksanyan owns "Yerevan City" and "Kaiser" supermarket chain, which is considered a subsidiary of the latter. The supermarket chains owned by Samvel Aleksanyan caused the closure of shops and kiosks considered small and medium businesses, as a result of which the level of unemployment and, consequently, poverty in Armenia increased, which in turn affected the increase in emigration of the country's population.

=== "Vodka" production and false labelling ===
Aleksanyan is also known for the production of low-quality vodka and the counterfeiting of internationally recognized vodka brands. He allegedly conducts these activities through "A and G" LLC, an unregistered company that has nonetheless received tax benefits from the Armenian government.

=== "Alex Grieg" company ===
The company "Alex Grig" holds a near-monopoly on the import of essential food products into Armenia, including sugar, butter, oil, and other goods. "Alex Grig" accounts for 99.9% of Armenia's sugar imports. This was confirmed by then-President Serzh Sargsyan during a January 29, 2014, meeting with the Armenian community in Prague, where he reportedly stated, "What do you want, ten people importing sugar in a small country?"

== Charities ==
Aleksanyan is a philanthropist. He is known for charitable work across various sectors, primarily focused on Yerevan's Malatia-Sebastia administrative district, which he represented in the National Assembly. This assistance includes school renovations, equipment purchases, and funding for school events.

== Public sentiments ==
Supporters of converting the Closed Market—a historic building on Yerevan's Mashtots Avenue owned by Samvel Aleksanyan—into a "Yerevan City" supermarket rallied in front of the building during renovations. This group of approximately 1,000, led by Robert Aharonyan (a pro-USSR, Russia-oriented activist) and political scientist Suren Surenyants (a former member of the Republican Party), chanted "Aleksanyan, benefactor!" and wore red hats to demonstrate their support.
