= Unified Armenians Party =

Unified Armenians Party Միավորված Հայեր կուսակցություն
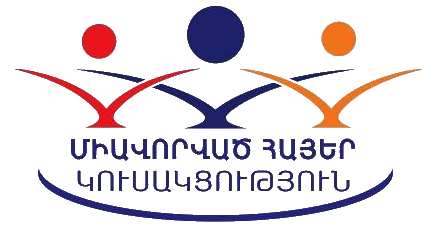
- Leader: Ruben Avagyan
- Founded: 2000
- Headquarters: Yerevan
- Ideology: Pro-Europeanism
- Political position: Centre
- Slogan: "Third power, new power, new persons"
- National Assembly: 0 / 107

Website
- mhk.am

The Unified Armenians Party (Armenian: Միավորված Հայեր կուսակցություն, romanized: Miavorvats Hayer Kusaksutyun) is a political party in Armenia. It is led by Ruben Avagyan.

== History ==
The party nominated Ruben Avagyan as its candidate in the 2003 Armenian presidential election. Avagyan came in sixth place, receiving 0.41% of the vote.

The party failed to gain any representation in the National Assembly after the 2012 Armenian parliamentary election, receiving just 0.20% of the popular vote.

In 2017, the party formed the "Armenian Renaissance" alliance and merged with Orinats Yerkir, a centrist Pro-European political party. However, the alliance failed to win any seats following the 2017 Armenian parliamentary election, receiving only 3.72% of the popular vote. The alliance dissolved shortly after.

The party did not participate in the 2018 or 2021 Armenian parliamentary elections.

== Ideology ==
The party maintains a centrist, national-patriotic ideology and supports the development a strong civil society and democracy in Armenia, while strengthening living standards and the middle-class. The party also supports the self-determination of the Republic of Artsakh and the activities of the Armenian Apostolic Church.

The parties manifesto calls for the continued European integration of Armenia and states that European integration will contribute to Armenia's and the Caucasus regions stability and economic development. The party also believes in maintaining close cooperation with Russia and CIS member states.

== See also ==
- Programs of political parties in Armenia
