= Sergey Badalyan =

Armenian politician

Sergey Grigori Badalyan (Armenian: Սերգեյ Գրիգորի Բադալյան; 4 July 1947 – 24 November 1999) was an Armenian politician who served as the first secretary of the Armenian Communist Party from 1991 to 1999.

Badalyan was born in Yerevan in 1947. He studied engineering and mathematics at the Yerevan Polytechnic Institute. He worked at the institute as an assistant professor from 1970 to 1973. From 1973 to 1980, he worked at the Joint Institute of Nuclear Research in Dubna. From 1980 to 1982, he was the head of the scientific research group at the Yerevan Institute of Physics, then served as the secretary of the Communist Party committee of the same institute from 1982 to 1991.

Badalyan was elected to the National Assembly of Armenia as a deputy from the Armenian Communist Party in the parliamentary elections of 1995 and 1999. He led the Communist Party's parliamentary faction and served on the parliamentary committee on foreign relations. Badalyan stood as the Armenian Communist Party's presidential candidate in the 1996 and 1998 presidential elections. He came in third place in the 1996 election with 79,347 votes (6.30% of the total votes) and fourth place in the 1998 election with 155,023 votes (10.93%).

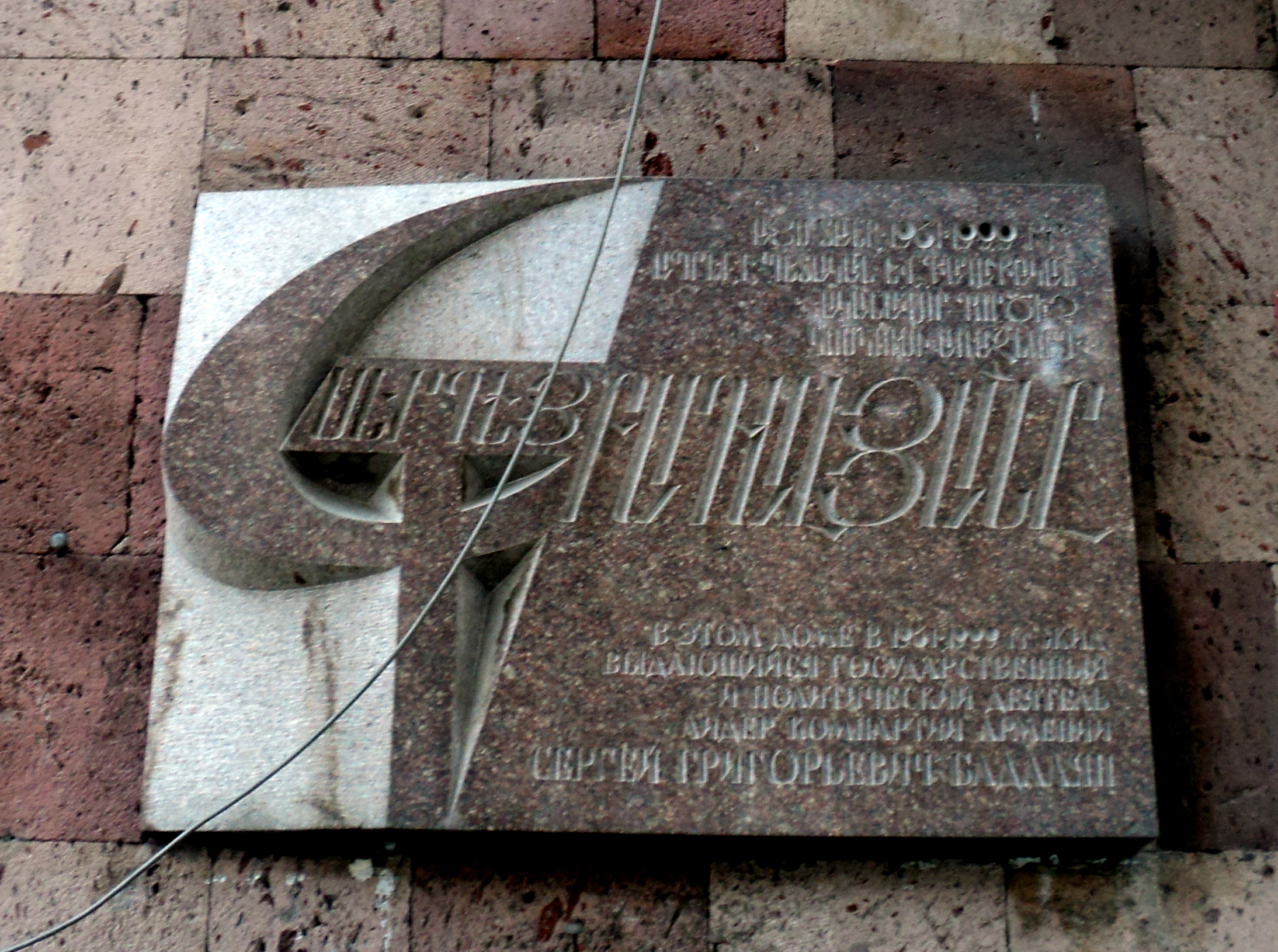
Plaque dedicated to Sergey Badalyan on his former home in Yerevan

He was a "special guest" of the Parliamentary Assembly of the Council of Europe from 20 September 1999 to 24 January 2000, although he died before the completion of his tenure.

Badalyan died suddenly in Moscow in November 1999 at the age of 52. Internal divisions ensued in the Armenian Communist Party following Badalyan's death, and the party ceased to be a significant political force.
