= Dignified Future Party =

Dignified Future Party Արժանապատիվ ապագա կուսակցություն
- Leader: Lyudmila Harutyunyan
- Founded: 1999
- Headquarters: Yerevan, Armenia
- Ideology: Technocracy
- Political position: Centre

The Dignified Future Party (Armenian: Արժանապատիվ ապագա կուսակցություն) is an Armenian political party.

== History ==
The party was founded in 1999 and participated in the 1999 Armenian parliamentary elections. Following the elections, the party won 3.25% of the popular vote, but failed to win any seats in the National Assembly.

Prior to the 2003 Armenian parliamentary election, the party formed a political alliance with the People's Democratic Party, known as the Dignity, Democracy, Motherland alliance. The alliance nominated Armen Darbinyan as its Chairman. The alliance participated in the 2003 elections, but won just 2.8% of the popular vote. The Dignified Future Party accused Darbinyan of trying to take control of their party and following the alliance's defeat in the elections, the alliance dissolved.

The party decided not to participate in the 2018 Armenian parliamentary election. The party released a statement advising that Nikol Pashinyan and his My Step Alliance should be given the opportunity to form a government and implement its own programs. The party advised that it would continue its activities as an extra-parliamentary force.

== Ideology ==
The party believes that the most important parts of the country should be led by professionals, rather than by politicians. The party advocates for improving support to families, allowing the Armenian Diaspora to vote in national elections, and supports young citizens to contribute to the development of the country.

== See also ==
- Programs of political parties in Armenia
