= Communist Party of Armenia (Soviet Union) =

1920–1991 ruling party of Armenia

Communist Party of Armenia Հայաստանի կոմունիստական կուսակցություն
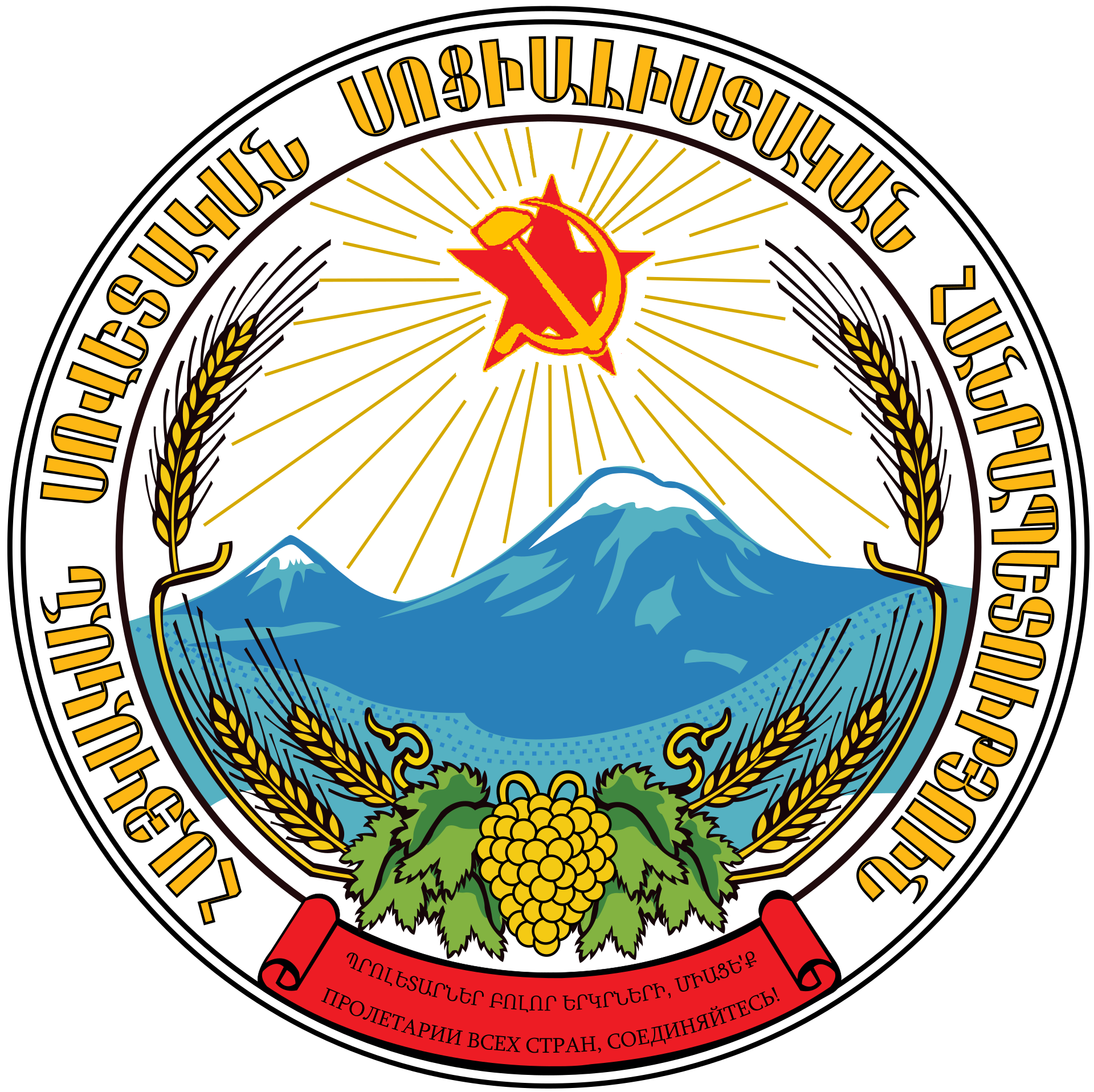
- First Secretary: Aram G. Sargsyan (last)
- Founded: 31 December 1920
- Dissolved: 7 September 1991
- Split from: Union of Armenian Social Democrats
- Succeeded by: Democratic Party of Armenia
- Headquarters: Yerevan
- Newspaper: Sovetakan Hayastan
- Membership (1986): 170,500
- Ideology: Communism; Marxism–Leninism
- Political position: Far-left
- National affiliation: CPSU
- Supreme Council (1990): 136 / 259 (53%)

Party flag

The Communist Party of Armenia (Armenian: Հայաստանի կոմունիստական կուսակցություն, Russian: Коммунистическая партия Армении) was a branch of the Communist Party of the Soviet Union within the Armenian SSR, and as such, the sole ruling party in the Armenian SSR.

== History ==
The first Marxist group in Armenia was founded by Stepan Shaumian in 1899 in Jalaloghli (modern-day Stepanavan). In 1902, Shaumian, Bogdan Knunyants and Arshak Zurabov jointly established the Union of Armenian Social Democrats in Tiflis (Tbilisi) as a branch of the Russian Social Democratic Labour Party. Like its parent organization, it split into a Bolshevik and Menshevik faction.

During the existence of the First Republic of Armenia (1918–1920), the Armenian Bolsheviks actively struggled against the government led by the Armenian Revolutionary Federation (Dashnaktsutiun). In September 1919, the Bolshevik organizations of Armenia created the Armenia Committee (Armenkom) of the Russian Communist Party (Bolsheviks). In May 1920, they led a failed armed uprising against the ARF-led government. Many of Armenian Bolsheviks were executed or forced to flee to newly Sovietized Azerbaijan following the failed uprising, and the communists' activities in Armenia practically ceased.

On 30 June 1920, the Russian Communist Party authorized the creation of the Communist parties of Armenia, Azerbaijan and Georgia, which were to be subordinated to the Kavbiuro of the party. In November 1920, the Armenian Revolutionary Committee (Armrevkom, chaired by Sarkis Kasyan) was created in Baku to facilitate the Sovietization of Armenia. On 29 November 1920, Armrevkom crossed into Armenia from Azerbaijan together with the 11th Red Army and declared the Armenian Soviet Socialist Republic.

The Communist Party of Armenia's first congress took place in January 1922, the same year that the Soviet Union was officially founded with the Transcaucasian SFSR (and with it Soviet Armenia) as a constituent member. The party published the daily newspaper Sovetakan Hayastan ("Soviet Armenia") [hy] and the monthly magazine Leninyan Ughiov ("On Lenin's Path") [hy]. During Joseph Stalin's Great Purge, many of the party's leaders were accused of being Trotskyists, Dashnaks, or Specifists, and were executed or exiled. Most were later rehabilitated during Nikita Khrushchev's Thaw.

In Soviet Armenia, there was "heated controversy" about the founding date of the Communist Party of Armenia. While the party governing the Armenian SSR was founded in 1920, the poet Gurgen Haykuni [hy] established an earlier Communist Party of Armenia in Tiflis in 1918, "with the aim of promoting the Bolshevik cause among Ottoman Armenian refugees who had fled the 1915 [Armenian] Genocide." Earlier attacked or ignored in Soviet Armenian historiography, Haykuni's Communist Party was later "given belated recognition in histories of Soviet Armenia" during the Khrushchev era. In a meeting with Soviet Armenian historians in Yerevan in March 1962, Anastas Mikoyan declared that there was "no need to deny the positive role of the 'Communist Party of Armenia' headed by Comrade Haykuni." Mikoyan also acted as a consultant on an article on the issue, co-authored by Lev Shaumyan and published in the journal Kommunist in April 1962.

The Communist Party began to lose influence in Armenia during Mikhail Gorbachev's glasnost and perestroika, amid the Karabakh movement. In the elections for the Supreme Soviet of the Armenian SSR in 1990, it came in second to the non-communist Pan-Armenian National Movement. On 4 August 1990, Levon Ter-Petrosyan was elected chairman of the Supreme Soviet. This was the first time that a non-communist party had come to power in a Soviet republic. The 19th Congress of the Communist Party of Armenia, held on 7 September 1991, decided to dissolve the party. The party's last leader, Aram G. Sargsyan, created the Democratic Party of Armenia. The same year, the new Armenian Communist Party was established under the leadership of Sergey Badalyan, which considered itself the successor of the Soviet Communist Party of Armenia.

== Leadership ==
| No. | Picture | Name (Birth–Death) | Took office | Left office |
First Secretary
| 1 | | Gevorg Alikhanyan (1897–1938) | December 1920 | May 1921 |
General Secretary
| 2 | | Askanaz Mravyan (1885–1929) | May 1921 | January 1922 |
First Secretary
| 3 | | Ashot Hovhannisyan (1887–1972) | January 1922 | 6 July 1927 |
| 4 | | Hayk Ovsepyan (1891–1937) | 6 July 1927 | 8 April 1928 |
| 5 | | Haykaz Kostanyan (1897–1938) | 8 April 1928 | 7 May 1930 |
| 6 | | Aghasi Khanjian (1901–1936) | 7 May 1930 | 9 July 1936 |
| 7 | | Amatuni Amatuni (1900–1938) | 21 September 1936 | 23 September 1937 |
| 8 | | Grigory Arutinov (1900–1957) | 23 September 1937 | 28 November 1953 |
| 9 | | Suren Tovmasyan (1909–1980) | 28 November 1953 | 28 December 1960 |
| 10 | | Yakov Zarobyan (1908–1980) | 28 December 1960 | 5 February 1966 |
| 11 | | Anton Kochinyan (1913–1990) | 5 February 1966 | 27 November 1974 |
| 12 | | Karen Demirchyan (1932–1999) | 27 November 1974 | 21 May 1988 |
| 13 | | Suren Harutyunyan [hy] (1939–2019) | 21 May 1988 | 5 April 1990 |
| 14 | | Vladimir Movsisyan (1934–2014) | 5 April 1990 | 30 November 1990 |
| 15 | | Stepan Pogosyan (1932–2012) | 30 November 1990 | 14 May 1991 |
| 16 | | Aram Sargsyan (1949–) | 14 May 1991 | 7 September 1991 |

== Bibliography ==
- Hambardzumyan, Viktor, ed. (1980). "Հայաստանի կոմունիստական կուսակցություն (ՀԿԿ)". Soviet Armenian Encyclopedia (in Armenian). Vol. 6. Yerevan: Armenian Academy of Sciences.
- Hobday, Charles (1986). Communist and Marxist Parties of the World. Harlow: Longman. ISBN 0-582-90264-9.
- Hovannisian, Richard G. (1971). The Republic of Armenia. Vol. 1: The First Year, 1918–1919. Berkeley: University of California Press. ISBN 978-0520019843.
- Hovannisian, Richard G. (1996a). The Republic of Armenia. Vol. 3: From London to Sèvres, February–August 1920. Berkeley: University of California Press. ISBN 978-0520088030.
- Shakarian, Pietro A. (2025). Anastas Mikoyan: An Armenian Reformer in Khrushchev's Kremlin. Bloomington: Indiana University Press. ISBN 978-0253073556.
- Suny, Ronald Grigor (1993). Looking toward Ararat: Armenia in Modern History. Bloomington: Indiana University Press. ISBN 978-0-253-20773-9.
