= Vazgen Manukyan =

Prime Minister of Armenia from 1990 to 1991

- Վազգեն Մանուկյան
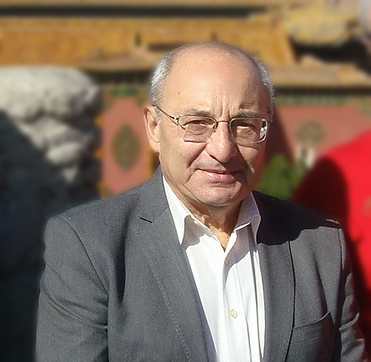
- Manukyan in 2012

1st Prime Minister of Armenia
- In office 13 August 1990 – 22 November 1991
- President: Levon Ter-Petrosyan
- Preceded by: Position established
- Succeeded by: Gagik Harutyunyan

Acting Defence Minister of Armenia
- In office 20 October 1992 – 21 August 1993
- President: Levon Ter-Petrosyan
- Preceded by: Vazgen Sargsyan
- Succeeded by: Serzh Sargsyan

Chairman of the National Democratic Union
- Incumbent
- Assumed office 26 September 1991
- Preceded by: Position established

Personal details
- Born: 13 February 1946 (age 80) Leninakan, Armenian SSR, Soviet Union
- Party: National Democratic Union
- Website: https://vazgenmanukyan.am/en/

Vazgen Mikayeli Manukyan (Armenian: Վազգեն Միքայելի Մանուկյան, born 13 February 1946) is an Armenian politician who served as the first Prime Minister of Armenia from 1990 to 1991. From 1992 to 1993, during the First Nagorno-Karabakh War, Manukyan was acting Defence Minister of Armenia. He was also a member of Armenia's parliament from 1990 to 2007.

Vazgen Manukyan was a co-founder and the coordinator of the Karabakh Committee (officially founded in February 1988), the body which led the Karabakh movement aimed at uniting Nagorno-Karabakh with Soviet Armenia. He was arrested by Soviet authorities on December 10, 1988, along with other members of the Karabakh Committee, and spent 6 months in Moscow's Matrosskaya Tishina prison. He was elected the first chairman of the Pan-Armenian National Movement in October 1989.

From 1990 to 1991, he served as the Prime Minister of Armenia. On September 26, 1991, Vazgen Manukyan resigned as prime minister and founded his own party, the National Democratic Union (NDU), and has since served as its chairman. In September 1992, he was appointed Minister of State and Minister of Defense, while managing the military–industrial complex of Armenia at the same time. Under Vazgen Manukyan, the Armenian Armed Forces were formed, the course of the war changed in favor of the Armenian side. He was dismissed from his post in August 1993.

In the 1996 Armenian presidential elections, Vazgen Manukyan received the support of the major opposition parties and was the main challenger to incumbent President Levon Ter-Petrosyan. The 1996 elections were marred by widespread electoral fraud in favor of President Ter-Petrosyan. According to the official results, Manukyan received 41% of the votes, losing to Ter-Petrosyan without a runoff election. The opposition disputed the results of the elections and major protests broke out in Yerevan, which were suppressed by the police and military. Vazgen Manukyan lost further presidential elections in 1998, 2003 and 2008.

From March 2009 to December 2019, he was the Chairman of the Public Council of Armenia. Since 2019, he has been the President of the Vernatun Socio-Political Club.

In the aftermath of the defeat of the Armenian side in the 2020 Nagorno-Karabakh war and the signing of the 2020 Nagorno-Karabakh ceasefire agreement, a wave of protests broke out in Armenia demanding the resignation of Prime Minister Nikol Pashinyan. On 3 December 2020, a coalition of 17 parliamentary and extra-parliamentary political parties formed the Homeland Salvation Movement and nominated Vazgen Manukyan as their joint candidate for the position of prime minister and to form a transitional government. Ultimately, neither Vazgen Manukyan nor the Homeland Salvation Movement participated in the 2021 parliamentary elections.

== Early life and career ==
Vazgen Manukyan was born in Leninakan (modern-day Gyumri) in 1946. His family emigrated to Yerevan from the region of Moxoene during the Armenian genocide. His father, Mikael Manuki Manukyan, was a doctor of sciences and a professor at Yerevan State University. His mother, Astghik Hmayaki Hakobyan, was born in Gyumri and graduated from the Faculty of Physics and Mathematics of Yerevan State University.

Vazgen Manukyan attended Yerevan's Anton Chekhov School no. 55. From 1963 to 1968 he studied at the Faculty of Physics and Mathematics of Yerevan State University, then from 1966 to 1967 he continued his studies at Moscow State University, and conducted his postgraduate studies at the Academy of Sciences of the Soviet Union from 1969 to 1972. He is a candidate of physics and mathematics, has the title of Docent, and has authored a number of scientific articles. From 1972 to 1990 he lectured at Yerevan State University.

On April 24, 1967, he was forced to leave Moscow State University and return to Yerevan for participating in a protest in front of the Turkish Embassy in Moscow.

His wife, Varduhi Ishkhanyan, who is a mathematician by profession, is the daughter of well-known linguist and literary critic Rafael Ishkhanyan and linguist Byurakn Cheraz (whose father, Vahan Cheraz, was a famous Armenian athlete).

== Karabakh movement ==
In 1988, three movements emerged in Armenia at the same time. The first was a large environmental one, the second was a smaller one, mainly organized by dissidents who were released from prison in 1987. The third movement, which aimed to unite Nagorno-Karabakh with Armenia, was the one that gained the most momentum. In February 1988, the Karabakh Committee was established and soon took leadership of the Karabakh movement. Vazgen Manukyan was a founding member of the Karabakh Committee and became its coordinator in June 1988. The members of the committee often met in Manukyan's apartment.

Under the leadership of Vazgen Manukyan the Karabakh movement transformed from being purely concerned with the unification of Nagorno-Karabakh with Armenia into a broader national-democratic movement, eventually raising the question of independence. In May 1988, political and ideological differences emerged among the leaders of the movement. Some wanted to focus only on the Karabakh issue and thought that no other issues should be raised. Others held that so many issues existed in Soviet Armenia that it was impossible to successfully advance the Karabakh issue without raising those as well. Manukyan held the view that it was necessary to work towards Armenian independence alongside the issue of Nagorno-Karabakh, and gradually the demand for independence came to the forefront of the movement as well.

On July 5, 1988, after Karabakh protestors clashed with Soviet troops at Zvartnots Airport, Vazgen Manukyan gave a speech at Opera Square calling for a nationwide strike for the first time.

On August 19, 1988, at the Opera Square Vazgen Manukyan announced about the creation of the "Pan-Armenian National Movement" (ANM) and presents its ideological principles. Later when ANM founding board was created it consisted of almost all the members of the Karabakh Committee and Vazgen Manukyan was elected the first chairman of the party board.

On December 10, 1988, Vazgen Manukyan was arrested along with the other members of the Karabakh Committee and spent six months in Moscow's Matrosskaya Tishina prison before being released and returning to Yerevan, where the committee continued its activities.

== Prime Minister of Armenia ==
In elections in May 1990, the Pan-Armenian National Movement won a majority of seats in the Supreme Soviet of Armenia, becoming the first non-communist party to take power in a Soviet republic.

In May 1990, Vazgen Manukyan was elected a member of the Supreme Council of Armenia, and on August 13, 1990, he was appointed Chairman of the Council of Ministers of Armenia by the Supreme Council as a result, becoming the last head of government of Soviet Armenia and the first prime minister of the Third Republic of Armenia after it declared independence on September 21, 1991. Manukyan became head of government during a difficult period for Armenia: the USSR was rapidly collapsing, and the political and economic blockade of Armenia from the north began.

Manukyan's government had to deal with the collapse of the Soviet economic system and took the first steps to move towards a new economic system based on private property. Vazgen Manukyan maintained a strong layer of professionals, experienced ministers and directors of large factories, who played a major role in establishing full relations with the new government, the USSR economic structures. According to Manukyan, the systemic reforms launched by his government provided a serious foundation for Armenia's further development.

On September 25, 1991, due to growing disagreements with Levon Ter-Petrosyan and other members of the ANM, Manukyan resigned as prime minister and founded his own party called the National Democratic Union.

== Defence Minister ==
Although Manukyan and other opposition politicians had called for Levon Ter-Petrosyan's resignation following setbacks in the Nagorno-Karabakh War in the summer of 1992, Ter-Petrosyan appointed Manukyan State Minister in September 1992 and Minister of Defense in October. During Manukyan's ministry, the regular Armenian Army was formed and the Armenian side registered a series of military victories against Azerbaijan. Through the efforts of Manukyan and his deputy, Soviet Army officer Norat Ter-Grigoryants, the advance of the Azerbaijani Army was suppressed. Armenian forces then went on the offensive, capturing the entirety of the Kalbajar, Zangilan, Jabrayil, and Agdam districts of Azerbaijan, as well as part of Fuzuli District between April and August 1993. This created the frontline between Armenian and Azerbaijani forces that remained essentially unchanged until the 2020 Nagorno-Karabakh war. On Republic Day in May 1993, a military parade of the newly formed military on the occasion of the diamond jubilee of the First Republic of Armenia was held on Republic Square in Yerevan, during which Defence Minister Manukyan delivered the holiday address during that event.

== 1996 presidential election ==
In the September 1996 presidential election, Vazgen Manukyan was the main contender against incumbent president Levon Ter-Petrosyan. Although Ter-Petrosyan was initially expected to win by a large margin due to the opposition being divided, three other candidates dropped out of the race and endorsed Manukyan. According to the official results, Manukyan received 41% of the vote, while Ter-Petrosyan received about 52%, just above the 50% required to win without a runoff election. Manukyan refused to accept the results of the election, alleging widespread fraud. On September 25, Manukyan came to the Armenian parliament with a large crowd of 150–200,000 of his supporters to demand that the Central Electoral Commission check three randomly chosen ballot boxes from each province for fraud. Manukyan told the crowd to come after him if he did not return in 20–30 minutes, after which his supporters stormed the parliament building and beat the speaker and deputy speaker of parliament. President Ter-Petrosyan declared a state of emergency and ordered the army to restore order. On 1 October 1996, the ODIHR mission sent to observe the election issued a statement which said that while irregularities in the counting process "did not characterize the entire vote tabulation process [they] do raise questions about the integrity of the election process." In 1998, former interior minister under Ter-Petrosyan Vano Siradeghyan also alleged that the results of the 1996 election had been falsified.

== Post-government career ==
Manukyan received around 12 percent of the votes in the special presidential elections held in 1998. He ran for president again in 2003 and received less than 1% of the vote. In the February 2008 presidential election, Manukyan placed fifth with 1.3% of the vote according to final official results.

From March 2009 to December 2019, he was the Chairman of the Public Council of Armenia, a consultative body within the Ministry of Justice. Since 2019, he has been the President of the Vernatun Socio-Political Club.

In 2020, following the protests that broke out over the Nagorno-Karabakh ceasefire agreement that Prime Minister Nikol Pashinyan signed to end to the 2020 Nagorno-Karabakh war, a coalition of 17 opposition parties (most notably the former ruling Republican Party, the parliamentary opposition party Prosperous Armenia, and the Armenian Revolutionary Federation) under the name of the "Homeland Salvation Movement" announced Manukyan as their candidate to lead a “national accord” government.

== Electoral history ==
President of Armenia
Election year	Votes	%	Position
1996	516,129	41.0%	2
1998	172,449	12.2%	3
2003	12,904	0.91%	5
2008	21,075	1.3%	5

Political offices
Preceded by None; part of the Soviet Union	Prime Minister of Armenia; 1990–1991	Succeeded by Gagik Harutyunyan
