= Citizen's Decision =

Citizen's Decision Քաղաքացու որոշում
- Abbreviation: ՔՈ
- Secretary: Gor Hakobyan
- Founded: November 3, 2018
- Headquarters: Yerevan
- Ideology: Social democracy Welfarism; Environmentalism; Direct democracy
- Political position: Centre-left to left-wing
- Colors: green
- National Assembly: 0 / 107

Website
- www.sdp.am

Citizen's Decision (Armenian: Քաղաքացու որոշում, romanized: K’aghak’ats’u voroshum, abbreviated ՔՈ, K’O, 'Your'), also known as the Citizen's Decision Social-Democratic Party, is an Armenian social-democratic political party founded in November 2018 by a group of left-leaning activists following the Velvet Revolution. The party traces back its origin to the 2012 Mashtots Park Movement.

== History ==
The party currently acts as an extra-parliamentary force. The party participated in the 2018 parliamentary election, winning just 0.68% of the vote. During the election campaign, the party voiced criticisms of Prime Minister Nikol Pashinyan for alleged shortcomings and advocated reforming the Constitution, the Electoral Code, and instituting transitional justice.

In May 2021, the party confirmed it would participate in the 2021 Armenian parliamentary elections. Following the election, the party won just 0.30% of the popular vote, failing to win any seats in the National Assembly.

In November 2021, the party participated in municipal elections in the city of Dilijan, winning 2 seats in the Dilijan city council.

In March 2023, the party participated in local elections in Sisian.

== Ideology ==
The party advocates for the welfare state, redistribution of wealth, environmentalism, universal healthcare, free education, gender equality, support of trade unions, and direct democracy.

In addition, the party advocates for self-determination of the Republic of Artsakh, establishing peace in the Caucasus region and maintaining neutral relations with Russia. Some party members have called for the renegotiation of agreements between Armenia and Russia, in particular, the presence of the Russian military base in Armenia.

== Electoral performance ==
In the 2018 election, the party won 8,530 votes or 0.68% of the total vote. The party won 1.3% in Arabkir and 1.2% in Kentron districts of Yerevan. Outside the capital, it had above-average support in the province of Tavush, especially in the regional center Ijevan (2.8%) and the village of Yenokavan (28.6%). The latter was explained by the endorsement of the party and speculated financial support by Tigran Chibukhchyan, the owner of Yell Extreme Park based in Yenokavan.

=== Parliamentary elections ===
| Election | Leader | Votes | % | Seats | +/– | Position | Government |
|---|---|---|---|---|---|---|---|
| 2018 | Suren Sahakyan | 8,514 | 0.68 | 0 / 132 | 0 | ▲9th | Extra-parliamentary |
| 2021 | Suren Sahakyan | 3,775 | 0.30 | 0 / 107 | 0 | ▼18th | Extra-parliamentary |

== Activities ==
In November 2020, Suren Sahakyan along with the leaders of the Democratic Party of Armenia and the Armenian Constructive Party met with President Armen Sargsyan to discuss the political situation in Armenia and the Nagorno-Karabakh conflict.

On 26 February 2021, the Citizen's Decision party held a joint rally with the National Democratic Pole in Yerevan.

== See also ==
- Programs of political parties in Armenia
- Politics of Armenia
