= National Democratic Union (Armenia) =

National Democratic Union Ազգային ժողովրդավարական միություն
- Abbreviation: AZhM
- Leader: Vazgen Manukyan
- Founded: 1991
- Headquarters: Yerevan
- Ideology: Liberalism
- Political position: Centre
- National affiliation: Homeland Salvation Movement (2020-2021)
- National Assembly: 0 / 107

Website
- www.vazgenmanukyan.am

The National Democratic Union (Armenian: Ազգային ժողովրդավարական միություն, romanized: Azgayin zhoghovrdavarakan miut’yun; AZhM) is a political party in Armenia. Vazgen Manukyan, who served as the Prime Minister of Armenia from 1990 to 1991, is the current chairman of the party.

== History ==
The party received 7.7% of the vote in the 1995 Armenian parliamentary election and won five seats in the National Assembly.

The party nominated Manukyan as its candidate in the 1996 Armenian presidential election, he came in second place winning 41% of the vote.

The party gained won 6 seats in the National Assembly following the 1999 Armenian parliamentary election.

The party nominated Manukyan as its candidate in the 2003 Armenian presidential election. Manukyan came in fifth place, receiving 0.90% of the vote.

The party nominated Manukyan as its candidate in the 2008 Armenian presidential election. Manukyan came in fifth place, receiving 1.29% of the vote.

The party refused to participate in the 2018 parliamentary elections. However, the party stated that it will regroup, refocus its ideology and strengthen its ranks following the 2018 parliamentary elections.

During the 2020–2021 Armenian protests, Vazgen Manukyan was nominated by the Homeland Salvation Movement political alliance to be its leader.

The National Democratic Union did not participate in the 2021 Armenian parliamentary elections. The party currently has no representation in the National Assembly and acts as an extra-parliamentary force.

A single member of the National Democratic Union, Adrine Avagyan, participated in the 2023 Yerevan City Council election under the Mother Armenia Alliance ballot.

== Ideology ==
The party supports the reunification of Artsakh with Armenia, improving human rights and democracy, as well as strengthening Armenia's economy.

== See also ==
- Programs of political parties in Armenia
