= Democratic Party of Armenia =

Democratic Party of Armenia Հայաստանի Դեմոկրատական Կուսակցություն
- Leader: Aram Gaspar Sargsyan
- Founded: 1991
- Preceded by: Communist Party of Armenia
- Headquarters: Yerevan
- Ideology: Democratic socialism
- Political position: Left-wing

The Democratic Party of Armenia (Armenian: Հայաստանի Դեմոկրատական Կուսակցություն, Hayastani Demokratakan Kusaktsutyun) is a democratic socialist political party in Armenia. It was established in 1991 by Aram Gaspar Sargsyan, the last secretary of the Soviet-era Communist Party of Armenia when the party ruled the Armenian Soviet Socialist Republic (Armenian SSR) from 1920 until 1990.

== History ==
Following the dissolution of the Soviet Union and the Armenian SSR, the ruling Communist Party of Armenia had fallen into great disfavor. Its running secretary, Aram Gaspar Sargsyan, dissolved the party and established the Democratic Party of Armenia, appointing himself as the first secretary of the new party.

Meanwhile, Ruben Tovmasyan and some other party members, clearly unfavorable to Sargsyan's move to dissolve the original Communist Party of Armenia, founded a new Armenian Communist Party shortly thereafter.

The party participated in the 1999 Armenian parliamentary election, gaining just 0.98% of the popular vote.

The party nominated Sargsyan as its candidate in the 2003 Armenian presidential election. Sargsyan came in seventh place, receiving 0.21% of the vote. However, Sargsyan was a member of Parliament from 2003 to 2007. The party did not gain representation in the National Assembly following the 2007 parliamentary election as it failed to pass the 5% minimum threshold for parliamentary representation, gaining just 0.27% of the popular vote.

The party participated in the 2012 Armenian parliamentary elections, gaining only 0.37% of the vote.

The party endorsed Serzh Sargsyan for the 2013 presidential election.

Prior to the 2017 Armenian parliamentary election, the party had announced intentions to cooperate with the Third Republic Party and the Unity Party. Ultimately, the proposed alliance failed to form as the Third Republic Party decided not to participate in the elections, while the Unity Party joined the ORO Alliance.

The party decided not to participate in the 2018 parliamentary election.

The party confirmed that it would participate in the 2021 Armenian parliamentary elections. Four members of the Social Democrat Hunchakian Party were nominated to run under the Democratic Party of Armenia's electoral list. Following the election, the party won just 0.39% of the popular vote, failing to win any seats in the National Assembly.

The Democratic Party of Armenia does not have political representation in the National Assembly and currently acts as an extra-parliamentary force.

== Activities ==
In June 2019, representatives of the Democratic Party of Armenia held a meeting with President Armen Sarkissian and discussed domestic and foreign policy issues.

In November 2020, Aram Sargsyan, along with the leaders of the Armenian Constructive Party and the Citizen's Decision Party, met with President Armen Sargsyan to discuss the political situation in Armenia and the Nagorno-Karabakh conflict.

== See also ==
- Programs of political parties in Armenia
