= Ruben Tovmasyan =

Armenian politician

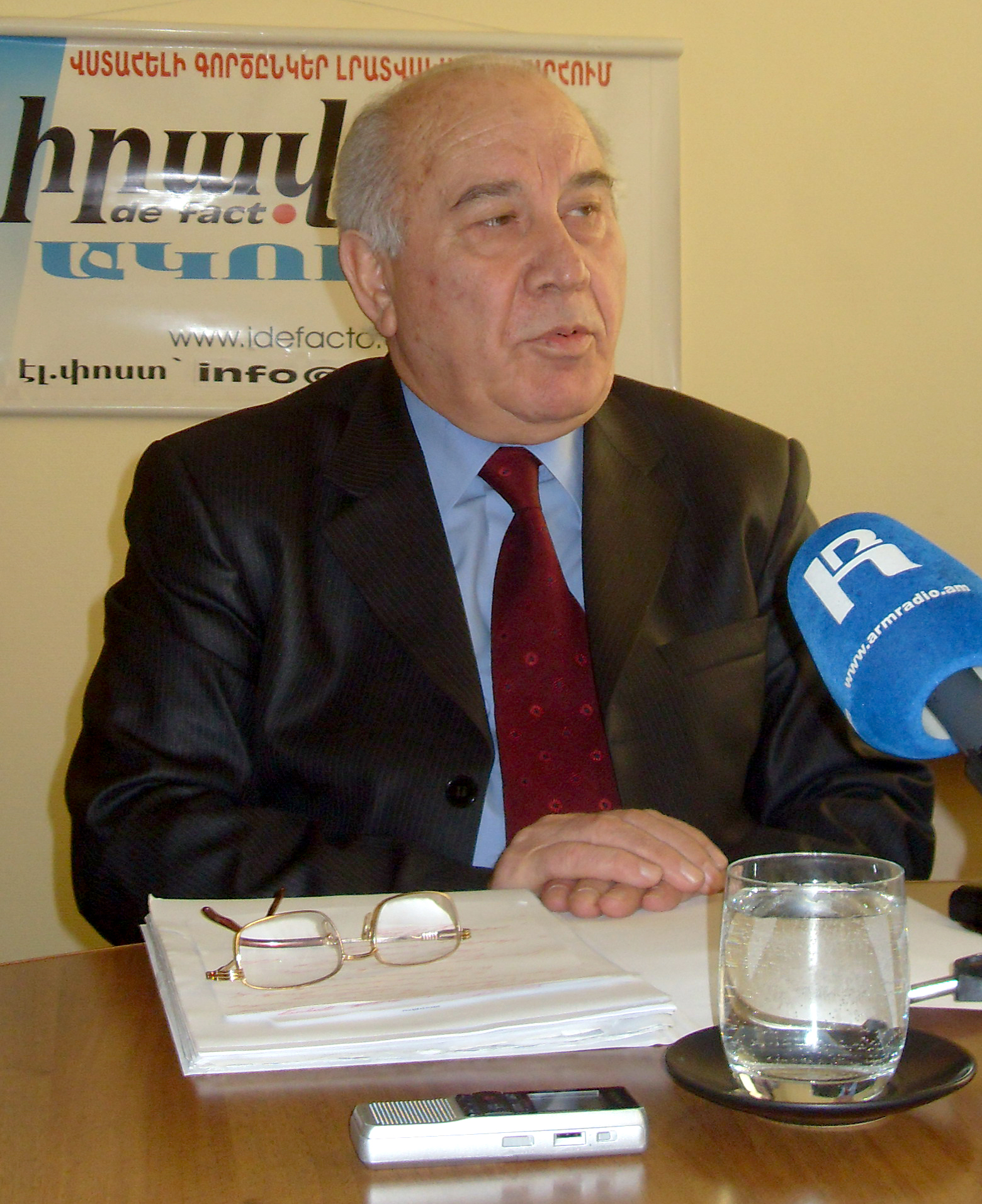

3rd First Secretary of the Armenian Communist Party
- In office 2005 – 23 February 2014
- Preceded by: Vladimir Darbinian
- Succeeded by: Tachat Sargsyan

Personal details
- Born: 15 February 1937 Yerevan
- Died: 30 March 2019 (aged 82)
- Party: Armenian Communist Party

Ruben Tovmasyan (Armenian: Ռուբեն Թովմասյան; February 15, 1937 – March 30, 2019) was the General Secretary of the Armenian Communist Party.

== Biography ==
In 1977, Tovmasyan graduated from the Armenian State University of Economics. From 1977 to 1989, he was the first secretary of the Orkhanikidze and Shahumian regional committees of the Communist Party of Armenia and the central office of the Communist Party. From 1989 to 1990, he was head of the Refugee Reception and Hosting Department. From 1991 until 1993, Tovmasyan was a member of the Transport and Communication Division of the Council of Ministers of Armenia. From 2000 to 2003, he was Secretary of the CPA Central Committee. In 2003, he was made First Secretary. Tovmasyan resigned from his position in 2013 for personal reasons.
