= Armenian Communist Party =

Armenian Communist Party Հայաստանի կոմունիստական կուսակցություն
- The logo of the party closely resembles the emblem of Soviet Armenia.
- Abbreviation: HKK
- Leader: Tachat Sargsyan
- Founded: 29 July 1991 (registered)
- Preceded by: Communist Party of Armenia (Soviet Union)
- Headquarters: Yerevan
- Newspaper: Hayastani Komunist
- Youth wing: Communist Youth Union of Armenia
- Membership: 18,000 (self-claimed, 2006)
- Ideology: Communism; Marxism–Leninism; Left-conservatism; Russophilia; Euroscepticism; Soviet patriotism
- Political position: Left-wing to far-left
- International affiliation: IMCWP; World Anti-Imperialist Platform
- Continental affiliation: UCP–CPSU
- Colors: Red
- Seats in National Assembly: 0 / 107

Party flag

Website
- https://komunist.am/

The Armenian Communist Party (Armenian: Հայաստանի կոմունիստական կուսակցություն, ՀԿԿ; Hayastani Komunistakan Kusaktsutyun, HKK) is a Marxist-Leninist party in Armenia. It considers itself the successor to the Armenian branch of the Communist Party of the Soviet Union. It is the main communist party in Armenia and claimed 18,000 members in 2006. HKK publishes Hayastani Komunist and Pravda Armenii.

It should not be confused with the historical Communist Party of Armenia during the Soviet era, nor the Democratic Party of Armenia, a party founded by the last secretary of the Communist Party of Armenia, Aram G. Sargsyan.

== Leadership ==
The title of the party leader is First Secretary. The current First Secretary of the Central Committee of the Communist Party of Armenia is Kazaryan Erdzhanik Yurikovich.

- 1991–1999: Sergey Badalyan
- 2000–2005: Vladimir Darbinyan
- 2005–2013: Ruben Tovmasyan
- 2013–2017: Tachat Sargsyan
- 2017–present: Erjanik Ghazaryan

== Ideology ==
The party often uses the flag of the Armenian SSR as its symbol.

In a 1994 rally, the party called for "a new union with Russia", calling it Armenia's "only salvation."

The party's programme in 1999 included:

- Armenia's transformation into a parliamentary republic
- Rejection of Western-style market reforms
- Socialism which embraces a mixed economy, including private property
- Close ties with Russia
- Nagorno-Karabakh's recognition as a subject of international law
- Armenia's accession to the Union State (the party did not explicitly call for the recreation of the USSR)

In 2001, the party and several thousand supporters advocated Armenia's membership into the Union State of Russia and Belarus. They continued the campaign for Armenia's membership into the union with Russia and Belarus in 2002. The party was described as "staunchly pro-Russian" by Radio Free Europe/Radio Liberty in 2002.

At a 2006 rally, the party's slogan was "Down with America, Always with Russia."

In 2011, party members marched through downtown Yerevan towards the square named after Stepan Shahumyan, an early Armenian communist revolutionary. They held banners reading "Socialism", "Long Live the Communist Party of Armenia", "Down with Capitalism", and "Forever with Russia". Its leader, Ruben Tovmasyan, stated: "History has proved that Armenia cannot live without Russia. The moment the Russian flag stops flying in Gyumri [a reference to Russian troops stationed in Armenia] Armenia will start moving towards its end as the enemy will be quick to attack us. The Communist Party of Armenia has always been in favor of consolidation among fraternal peoples."

The party supported the creation of the Eurasian Economic Union (EEU) and in 2013 welcomed Armenia's accession into the EEU as a "prelude to the restoration of the Soviet Union."

The party also opposes any further European integration of Armenia.

The party supported the 2022 Russian invasion of Ukraine. It staged a demonstration in support of Russia's "special military operation" to "demilitarise and denazify" Ukraine on March 4.

== Support base and electoral record ==
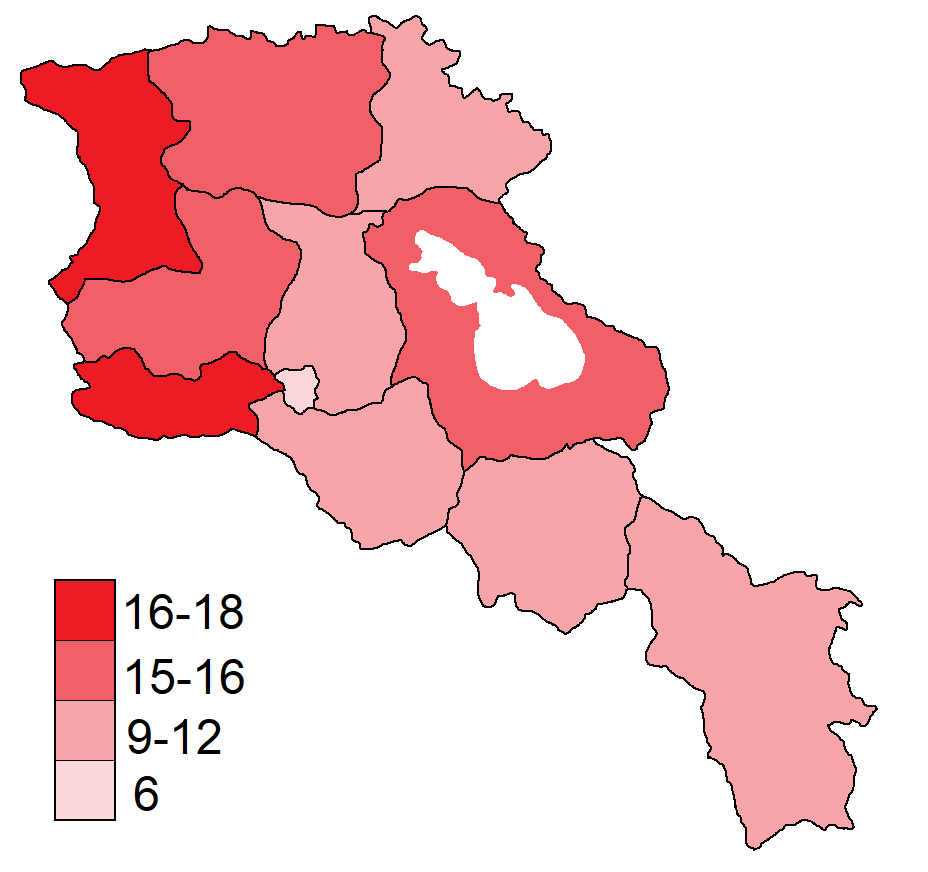
The share of votes of the Armenian Communist Party in the 1999 parliamentary elections by provinces of Armenia.

The party remained a significant political force in the 1990s under its charismatic leader Sergey Badalyan, who died in 1999. The party's 1994 May Day rally attracted some 10,000 to 60,000 supporters.

While it received only 12.4% of the vote in the July 1995 election, opinion polls both before and after the vote showed significantly more public support for the party. In a November 1994 poll, 40.1% of respondents backed the party and 37.6% did in a November 1995 poll.

In 2003, the Renewed Communist Party of Armenia opted to merge with the Armenian Communist Party.

The Armenian Communist Party has contested in every parliamentary election, but has failed to pass the 5% threshold since 2003. In 2003, the party accused the government of "mass falsifications." The party boycotted the 2018 Armenian parliamentary election for the first time since the collapse of the Soviet Union.

Year	Votes	%	Total seats	+/–	Position
1995	93,353	12.4%	10 / 190	New	3rd
1999	130,161	12%	10 / 131	Steady	2nd
2003	24.991	2.1%	0 / 131	▼10	▼11th
2007	8,792	0.7%	0 / 131	Steady	▼14th
2012	15,899	1.45%	0 / 131	Steady	
2017	11,745	0.75%	0 / 105	Steady	
2018	Boycott		0 / 132	Steady	
2021	Boycott		0 / 107	Steady	

== See also ==
- Communist Party of Artsakh – brother party in the former Republic of Artsakh
- Politics of Armenia
- Programs of political parties in Armenia
