= Orinats Yerkir =

Orinats Yerkir Օրինաց երկիր
- Leader: Artur Baghdasaryan
- Founded: 1998
- Headquarters: Yerevan
- Ideology: Liberal conservatism Christian democracy Pro-Europeanism
- Political position: Centre-right
- European affiliation: European People's Party (former observer)
- International affiliation: Centrist Democrat International
- Colours: gold blue
- National Assembly: 0 / 107

Website
- www.oek.am

Orinats Yerkir (Armenian: Օրինաց երկիր, lit. 'Rule of Law', ՕԵԿ/OEK) is a political party operating in Armenia. Its foundation was in 1998, and founder Artur Baghdasaryan continues to lead the party. The party was formerly known as Armenian Renaissance (Armenian: Հայկական վերածնունդ, romanized: Haykakan veratsnund), during the run-up to the 2017 parliamentary elections.

The party's name is translated into English in a number of ways, including Country of Law and Rule of Law.

== Party history ==
The party participated in elections for the first time during the 1999 Armenian parliamentary election, winning a total of 6 seats in the National Assembly.

Following the 2003 elections, the party won 19 seats. Also in 2003, Gagik Aslanyan, the Chairman of the People's Democratic Party, opted to merge his party with Orinats Yerkir.

Following the 2007 Armenian parliamentary elections, the party obtained 9 seats in the National Assembly.

In the February 2008 presidential election, Baghdasaryan was the party's candidate; he obtained third place, according to the final official results, with 17.7% of the vote.

The party participated in the 2009 Yerevan City Council election, winning 5.11% of votes, but failing to gain seats in the Yerevan City Council.

After the 2012 Armenian parliamentary election, the party won 6 seats in the National Assembly.

The party participated in the 2013 Yerevan City Council election, winning just 3.73% of votes, gaining no seats in the Yerevan City Council.

In 2014, during an interview, Petros Makeyan, the leader of the Democratic Homeland Party, proclaimed that Serzh Sargsyan, the leader of the Republican Party of Armenia, had been indirectly controlling the Orinats Yerkir party for years.

In 2017, the party was renamed "Armenian Renaissance" after the creation of a political alliance with the Unified Armenians Party, led by Ruben Avagyan. Following the 2017 Armenian parliamentary election, the alliance lost all political representation in the National Assembly, receiving just 3.72% of the popular vote. The alliance dissolved and Orinats Yerkir then decided to restore its original name during a meeting held on 13 February 2018.

The party participated in the 2018 Yerevan City Council election, winning just 1.09% of the popular vote, gaining no seats in the Yerevan City Council.

The party initially refused to participate in the 2018 Armenian parliamentary election because the National Assembly failed to pass amendments to electoral law, yet days later decided to register with the country's CEC in order to participate in the elections. It received just 0.99% of the popular vote. As this was lower than the 5% minimum threshold required, the party failed to gain any representation in the National Assembly.

During the 2020–2021 Armenian protests, Orinats Yerkir announced its support to the Homeland Salvation Movement political alliance, however, the alliance did not accept their request to join as a full member.

The party did not participate in the 2021 Armenian parliamentary election. The party currently acts as an extra-parliamentary force.

== Ideology ==
During an interview in 2007, party leader, Artur Baghdasaryan stated that, "Armenia's membership in the European Union should be one of the key priorities of our country's present and future foreign policy, as EU membership will open new avenues for Armenia." Baghdasaryan further stated that in order to begin accession negotiations with the EU, Armenia would have to strengthen its democracy and complete legal, social, economic and political reforms in order to meet European standards, just as the Baltic states have done.

The party is mostly pro-Western but also supports maintaining positive relations with Russia. The party additionally supports the goals and initiatives of the EU's Eastern Partnership program.

In 2018, the party announced that it supports Armenia's continued membership in the CSTO and the Eurasian Economic Union.

== Electoral history ==
Parliamentary elections
Year	Party-list			Constituency /total	Total seats	+/–
Year	Votes	%	Seats /total	Constituency /total	Total seats	+/–
1999	56,807	5.3%	4 /56	2 /75	6 /131	Steady
2003	148,381	12.9%	12 /56	7 /75	19 /131	▲13
2007	95,324	7.1%	16 /90	0 /41	9 /131	▼10
2012	83,123	5.5%	5 /90	1 /41	5 /131	▼4
2017	58,265	3.7%	0 /105	—	0 /105	▼5
2018	12,389	0.99%	0 /132	—	0 /132	Steady

== See also ==
- Category:Orinats Yerkir politicians
- Politics of Armenia
- Programs of political parties in Armenia
