= Aram G. Sargsyan =

Soviet-Armenian politician

Aram Gaspari Sargsyan
- Արամ Գասպարի Սարգսյան
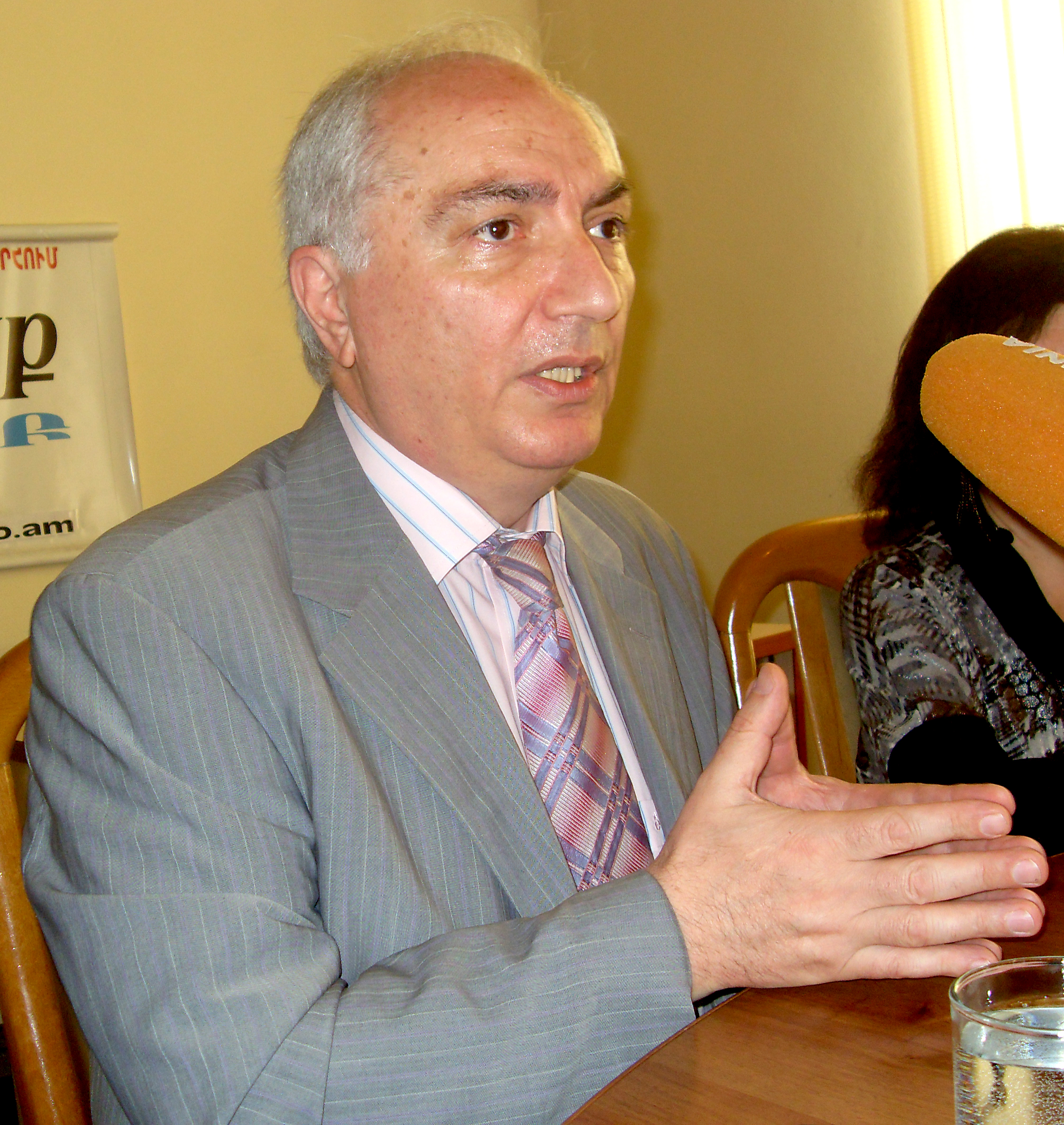

Member of the National Assembly of Armenia
- In office 2003–2007

Leader of Democratic Party of Armenia
- Incumbent
- Assumed office 1991

First Secretary of the Central Committee of the Communist Party of Armenia
- In office May 14, 1991 – September 7, 1991
- Preceded by: Stepan Pogosyan
- Succeeded by: position abolished

Personal details
- Born: Aram Gaspari Sargsyan; August 14, 1949 (age 77) Yerevan, Armenian SSR, Soviet Union
- Education: Yerevan State Linguistic University Moscow Higher Komsomol School
- Profession: politician

Aram Gaspari Sargsyan (Armenian: Արամ Գասպարի Սարգսյան; born August 14, 1949, Yerevan, Armenian SSR, Soviet Union) is an Armenian politician, social-democratic activist and former communist. He was the last leader of the Armenian Soviet Socialist Republic.

From 1967 to 1972 he studied at Yerevan State Linguistic University, then at Moscow Higher Komsomol School. Sargsyan worked in different factories. In the 1970–80s he was a correspondent for Komsomolskaya Pravda and Pravda in Armenia. In 1990 Sargsyan was the secretary of the Central Committee of the Communist Party of Armenia. From May 14, 1991, to September 7, 1991, he was the First Secretary of the Central Committee of the Communist Party of Armenia. After the dissolution of the communist party, he founded the Democratic Party of Armenia, which he has led since 1991. He was a member of Armenian parliament in 2003–2007 as a member of the parliamentary bloc Ardarutyun ("Justice").
