= 2003–2004 Armenian protests =

Armenian democracy movements

2003-2004 Armenian protests
- Date: March 2003 – April 2004
- Location: Yerevan, Armenia
- Caused by: alleged electoral fraud during the 2003 presidential election
- Goals: resignation of President Robert Kocharyan; new general elections
- Methods: demonstrations
- Result: Protests suppressed by force

Parties
Opposition parties: People's Party; National Unity; National Democratic Union; Unified Armenians; Democratic Party	Government of Armenia; Police

Lead figures
Stepan Demirchyan; Artashes Geghamyan; Vazgen Manukyan; Ruben Avagyan; Aram Sargsyan	Robert Kocharyan (President); Andranik Margaryan (PM); Artur Baghdasaryan (Parliament Speaker); Hayk Harutyunyan (Police Chief)

Number
500+ (9 April 2004); 10,000+ (12 April 2004)	

The 2003-2004 Armenian protests were a series of demonstrations held in Yerevan following the 2003 Armenian presidential election, led by former presidential candidate Stepan Demirchyan.

== Protests ==
=== April 12, 2004 ===
Opposition candidate Stepan Demirchyan, who was the official runner-up of that election, was defeated by Robert Kocharyan in the second round. Demirchyan started a protest demanding authority retirement in the Freedom Square, he later started a rally to Presidential Palace, but police blocked the road from the front of National Assembly, after this protesters announced a sit-in, later police attacked protesters to disperse the sit-in.

== See also ==
- 2008 Armenian presidential election protests
- 2011 Armenian protests
- 2013 Armenian protests
- List of protests in the 21st century
