= Protests in Armenia =

This is a list of protests in Armenia in chronological order:

- 1965 Yerevan demonstrations
- Karabakh movement (1988–1991)
- 1996 Armenian presidential election protests
- 2003–04 Armenian protests
- 2008 Armenian presidential election protests
- 2011 Armenian protests
- Mashtots Park Movement (2012)
- 2013 Armenian protests
- Electric Yerevan (2015)
- 2018 Armenian Velvet Revolution
- October 2018 protests in Armenia
- 2020–2021 Armenian protests
- 2022 Armenian protests
- 2023 Armenian protests
- 2024 Armenian protests
