= Armen Khachatryan =

Armenian politician

Permanent representative of Armenia to the CIS
- In office 26 April 2010 – 23 March 2017
- Preceded by: Oleg Yesayan
- Succeeded by: Oleg Yesayan

Ambassador of Armenia to Belarus
- In office 26 April 2010 – 23 March 2017
- Preceded by: Oleg Yesayan
- Succeeded by: Oleg Yesayan

Ambassador of Armenia to Moldova
- In office 5 March 2004 – 26 December 2016
- Preceded by: Hrach Silvanyan
- Succeeded by: Jivan Movsisyan

Ambassador of Armenia to Ukraine
- In office 7 October 2003 – 26 April 2010
- Preceded by: Hrach Silvanyan
- Succeeded by: Andranik Manukyan

4th President of the National Assembly of Armenia
- In office 2 November 1999 – 12 June 2003
- Preceded by: Karen Demirchyan
- Succeeded by: Artur Baghdasaryan

Member of the National Assembly for the Unity Bloc list
- In office 10 June 1999 – 21 March 2003

Personal details
- Born: August 13, 1957 Yerevan, Armenian SSR, Soviet Union
- Died: 3 June 2020 (aged 62)
- Party: Communist Party of Armenia (before 1991); People's Party of Armenia (1999-2001); Independent (after 2001)
- Education: Khachatur Abovyan Yerevan Pedagogical Institute

Armen Khachatryan was an Armenian academic, politician, and diplomat who was named the president of the National Assembly following the death most of its leadership in the Armenian parliament shooting.

== Early life ==
Khachatryan was born in Yerevan on 13 August 1957. He earned a PhD in Philology from the Khachatur Abovyan Yerevan Pedagogical Institute in 1978. From 1978 to 1980 he taught Armenian language and literature at a secondary school in Dzoraghbyur. From 1980 to 1981 he headed the scientific section at the State Gallery of Armenia.

In 1981 Khachatryan joined the Armenian Komsomol's Yerevan City Committee as an instructor, and was instructor at the Shahumyan committee from 1985 to 1987. From 1987 to 1990 he was the director of Yerevan Secondary School No. 191. After the fall of the Soviet Union he became a founding vice-rector and professor at Hrachia Acharian University from 1991 to 1999.

== Political career ==
Khachatryan was elected to the National Assembly in the 1999 election on the Unity Bloc list, as a member of the People's Party of Armenia. Khachatryan was the leader of the People's Party delegation to the assembly. He chaired the Assembly's Standing Committee on Foreign Relations.

On October 27, 1999 a group of armed men led by Nairi Hunanyan stormed the National Assembly and opened fire on its members. Prime Minister Vazgen Sargsyan, Assembly President Karen Demirchyan, and Deputy Presidents Yuri Bakhshyan and Ruben Miroyan, among others, where killed in the attack. Khachatryan would be injured in the shooting. In the aftermath the Assembly elected Khachatryan as its new President on November 2, 1999.

On July 4, 2000 Khachatryan announced that Armenia would be joining the Council of Europe, during which he also announced "we will strive to become a member of the European Union.” However, by September 2000 elements of the People's Party's coalition partner, the Republican Party, had started to gather petitions to call for his resignation after it was alleged that the leader of the People's Party was going behind their back to work with the opposition.

Not wanting to create further divisions within the coalition Khachatryan delivered a resignation speech on 26 September 2000, however, his resignation was rejected as the Assembly's vote of confidence passed with 63 votes in favor, 31 against, with 2 abstentions. To date this is the only time a speaker's resignation was rejected.

On July 17, 2001, Khachatryan announced that he would be formally ending his membership in the People’s Party, also alleging that leadership had "betrayed the political legacy" of its late founder Karen Demirchian by working with the opposition. He would also be joined by his deputy Gagik Aslanian with an estimated half of the 18-member People's Party Assembly delegation leaving the party.

Khachatryan had, until then, led a faction within the People's Party that were against any confrontation of accusing President Robert Kocharian and Prime Minister Andranik Markarian of the Parliament massacre. He also alleged that the leader of the party, Stepan Demirchian, was a "political protégé and hypocrite" trying to quell any internal dissent in the party.

When leaving the party Khachatryan hinted that he would create a new political party. However, when Aslanian and five other MPs created the People's Democratic Party Khachatryan refused to join it and instead remained an independent.

In July 2002 Khachatryan blocked an effort by the Assembly to impeach President Kocharian by refusing to place the issue on the legislative agenda. Afterwards, the pro-Kocharian camp empowered the speaker to remove any member of the assembly if they are being disruptive as several anti-Kocharian MPs would seize the podium during proceedings to try and raise the issue of impeachment.

In March 2003 Khachatryan announced that he would not be seeking re-election to the National Assembly in the elections later that year and would retire from politics, saying he is “tired” of his current job.

== Diplomatic career ==
After retiring from politics Khachatryan had a successful diplomatic career, serving as Armenia's Ambassador to Ukraine from 2004 to 2016 and was also Armenia's Ambassador to Moldova from 2004 to 2017 and Armenia's Ambassador to Belarus from 2010 to 2017. From 2017 to 2020 he served as an advisor to the Ministry of Foreign Affairs as Ambassador Extraordinary and Plenipotentiary.

== Personal life ==
Khachatryan was married and had one son and two daughters. He was fluent in Russian, English, and Polish. Armen Khachatryan died on June 3, 2020 at the age of 62.

== Awards ==
- Commonwealth Order - CIS
- Order of St. Andrew - Russia
- For exceptional activity in strengthening the unity of Orthodoxx peoples - International Fund of Orthodox Peoples
- Legion of Honour - France
- Fridtjof Nansen Gold Medal - Fridtjof Nansen Institute
- Order of St. Ignatius Theophoros - Assyrian Church of the East
- Cossack Cross - Ukraine
- Order of Peter the Great - Russia
- Order of Gorchakov - Russia
- St. George Medal - Ukraine

Political offices
Preceded by Karen Demirchyan	President of the National Assembly of Armenia; 1999–2003	Succeeded by Artur Baghdasaryan
