= 2003 Armenian presidential election =

Presidential election in Armenia

- 19 February 2003 (first round); 5 March 2003 (second round)
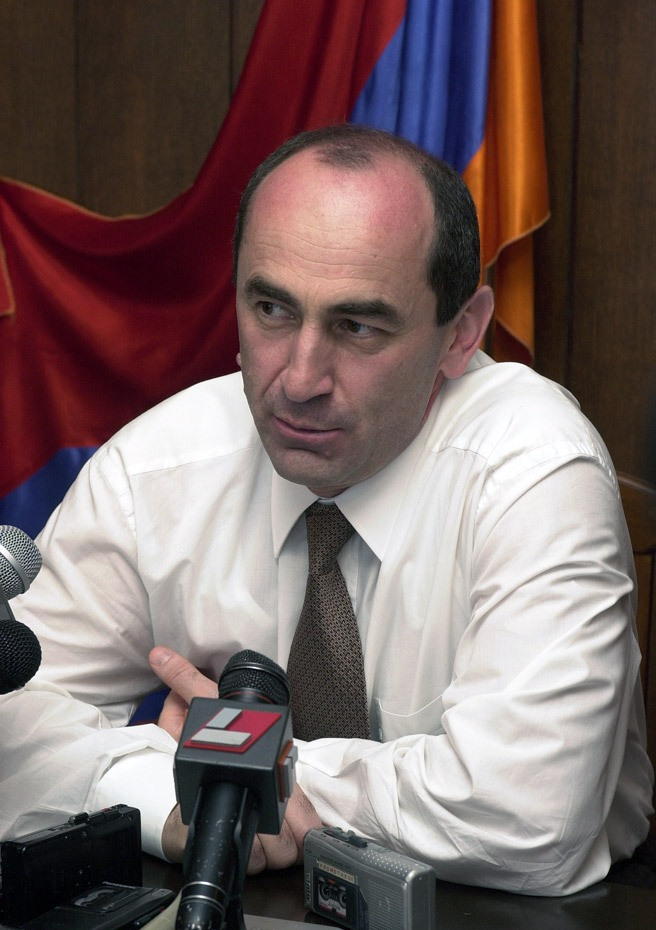

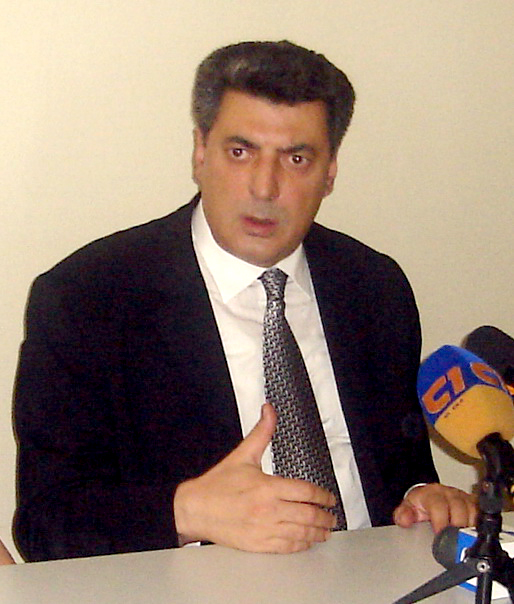
Nominee	Robert Kocharyan	Stepan Demirchyan
Party	Independent	People's Party
Popular vote	1,044,591	504,011
Percentage	67.45%	32.55%
President before election
Robert Kocharyan
Elected President
Robert Kocharyan

Presidential elections were held in Armenia on 19 February and 5 March 2003. No candidate received a majority in the first round of the election with the incumbent President Robert Kocharyan winning slightly under 50% of the vote. Therefore, a second round was held and Kocharyan defeated Stepan Demirchyan with official results showed him winning just over 67% of the vote. However, both the opposition and international observers said that the election had seen significant amounts of electoral fraud and the opposition did not recognise the results of the election.

== Background ==
Robert Kocharyan had been elected president in the 1998 presidential election defeating Karen Demirchyan. The election had been held when Levon Ter-Petrossian was forced to resign as President after agreeing to a plan to resolve the Nagorno-Karabakh conflict, which his ministers, including Kocharyan, had refused to accept.

On the 7 August 2002 the Central Electoral Commission of Armenia announced that the presidential election would be held on the 19 February 2003, with nominations required by 6 December 2002. Candidates had to supply 40,000 signatures of support in order to be able to stand in the election.

President Kocharyan had already announced that he would be running for re-election and the opposition parties attempted to agree on a united candidate to oppose him but were unsuccessful. Former President Levon Ter-Petrossian also contemplated running in the election but ultimately decided not to stand.

== First round ==
15 people announced that they would stand in election, but in the end 9 candidates stood in the first round of the presidential election. Reporting in the media was seen as being one-sided, with a media monitoring organisation saying that President Kocharyan received about five times as much coverage during the campaign as all the other eight candidates combined. Kocharyan campaigned on the record of economic growth during his presidency and got support from several political parties, while his campaign was run by the defence minister Serzh Sargsyan. Kocharyan's leading opponent was Stepan Demirchyan, the leader of the People's Party of Armenia and the son of Karen Demirchyan, a former Soviet leader of Armenia and speaker of the Armenian parliament who had been assassinated in 1999. Demirchyan ran in the election as an anti-corruption candidate. The other leading candidate was Artashes Geghamyan a former mayor of Yerevan, from the National Unity party.

Opinion polls in the run up to the election showed President Kocharyan as likely to win the 50% required in order to avoid a second round. Early results showed Kocharyan winning over half of the vote, but the final results of the first round showed that he had just failed to meet that target and so was forced into a second round against Stepan Demirchyan. This was first time any incumbent president in the Commonwealth of Independent States had failed to win in the first round of an election.

See-through ballot boxes were used to try to minimise any fraud in the election. However, the Organization for Security and Co-operation in Europe (OSCE), which had sent 200 election monitors to observe the election, described the lead up to the election as having "fell short of international standards in several key respects". Opposition observers at polling stations reported that ballot stuffing in favour of President Kocharyan had taken place and one member of the OSCE observers was reported as having described the election as "a disaster".

== Second round ==
Some opposition supporters called on Demirchyan to boycott the second round but, despite taking part in protests over the conduct of the first round, he did participate in the election. Most of the opposition parties rallied behind Demirchyan in the election and a television debate took place between the two candidates. Kocharyan called on voters in the second round to give him "a convincing victory that no-one can question". The official results saw President Kocharyan winning just over two thirds of vote in the second round and thus he was re-elected.

As in the first round the OSCE reported significant amounts of electoral fraud and numerous supporters of Demirchyan were arrested before the second round took place. Demirchyan described the election as having been rigged and called on his supporters to rally against the results. Tens of thousands of Armenians protested in the days after the election against the results and called on President Kocharyan to step down. However, Kocharyn was sworn in for a second term in early April and the Constitutional Court upheld the election, while recommending that a referendum be held within a year to confirm the election result.

== Results ==
Candidate	Party	First round		Second round	
Candidate	Party	Votes	%	Votes	%
Robert Kocharyan	Independent	710,674	49.83	1,044,591	67.45
Stepan Demirchyan	People's Party	399,757	28.03	504,011	32.55
Artashes Geghamyan	National Unity	250,145	17.54		
Aram Karapetyan	Independent	41,795	2.93		
Vazgen Manukyan	National Democratic Union	12,904	0.90		
Ruben Avagyan	Unified Armenians Party	5,788	0.41		
Aram G. Sargsyan	Democratic Party	3,034	0.21		
Garnik Margaryan	Motherland and Dignity	1,272	0.09		
Aram Harutyunyan	National Accord Party	854	0.06		
Total		1,426,223	100.00	1,548,602	100.00
Valid votes		1,426,223	97.45	1,548,602	99.07
Invalid/blank votes		37,276	2.55	14,469	0.93
Total votes		1,463,499	100.00	1,563,071	100.00
Registered voters/turnout		2,315,410	63.21	2,331,507	67.04
Source: IFES

=== Analysis ===
Hrant Mikayelian, researcher at the Caucasus Institute, noted that while falsifications during the election were significant and widespread, Kocharyan would have still won it in the second round, but at a far smaller margin.

== See also ==
- 2008 Armenian presidential election protests
- 2011 Armenian protests
- 2013 Armenian protests
