= Heghine Bisharyan =

Armenian politician and educator (born 1961)

- Հակոբ Հակոբյան
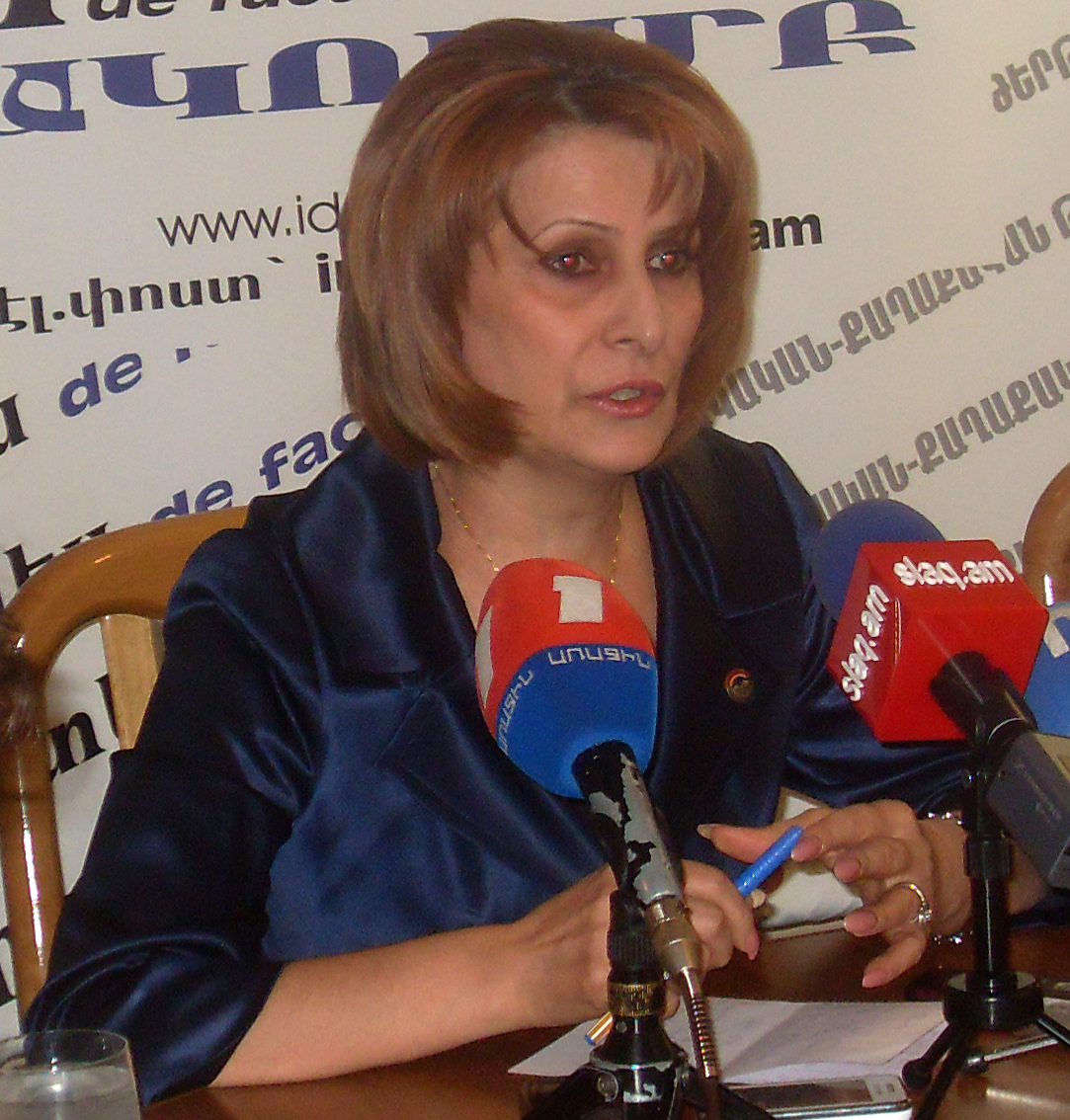

Member of National Assembly
- In office 2003–2017

Personal details
- Born: Heghine Vachei Bisharyan; 5 January 1961 (age 65) Yerevan, Armenian SSR, USSR
- Party: Orinats Yerkir

Heghine Vachei Bisharyan (Armenian: Հեղինե Վաչեի Բիշարյան; born 5 January 1961) is an Armenian politician and educator. She served as a member of the National Assembly from 2003 to 2017, representing Orinats Yerkir. Since 2017, she is the Rector of the European University of Armenia (EUA).

== Early life and education ==
Bisharyan was born in Yerevan on 5 January 1961. During the Soviet era, she worked as a foreman in the Yerevan electrical equipment factory from 1978 to 1988. In 1986, she has been a deputy of the Soviet Armenian Leninyan region. In 1991, she graduated from the Kirovakan State Pedagogical Institute as a teacher of Armenian language and literature. After Armenia's independence from the Soviet Union, she worked as a teacher at School No. 191 in Yerevan from 1994 to 2008.

== Political career ==
Bisharyan's political career began when she became a member of the National Assembly for Artur Baghdasaryan's center-right party Orinats Yerkir (OEK) in the 2003 parliamentary election. She then became secretary of the OEK faction and sat on the parliamentary Standing Committee on Science, Education, Culture and Youth. She also worked as a teacher at the Bakunz State Pedagogical University in Yerevan from 2005 to 2006. In the 2007 parliamentary election, Bisharyan managed to re-enter the National Assembly. She became a member of the Standing Committee for Science, Education, Culture, Youth and Sport and, from 2010, also of the Standing Committee for European Integration. She was appointed parliamentary group leader of the OEK parliamentary group on 15 May 2008. In 2010, she was elected as a member of the Armenian branch of the International Academy of Sciences for Nature and Society (IASNS).

Bisharyan was re-elected as a member of parliament in the 2012 parliamentary election. She remained OEK parliamentary group leader and sat again on the Standing Committee for Science, Education, Culture, Youth and Sport, as well as on the Standing Committee for Health Care, Maternity and Childhood. The parliamentary mandate ended in 2017 and the OEK, with 3.7% of the votes, missed the five percent threshold for re-entry into parliament.

== Later career and personal life ==
Since 2017, Bisharyan has been the rector of the European University of Armenia (EUA). She is married and has two children.

== Awards and honors ==
- Mkhitar Gosh Medal (2011)
