= Fair Speech Party =

Armenian political party

Fair Speech Party Արդար խոսքի կուսակցություն
- Leader: Albert Movsisyan
- Founded: 27 March 2024
- Headquarters: Yerevan, Armenia
- National Assembly: 0 / 107

Website
- Website

The Fair Speech Party (Armenian: Արդար խոսքի կուսակցություն, romanized: Ardar khosk’i kusakts’ut’yun), also known as Adar Verak and Righteous Speech, is an Armenian political party that is headquartered in Yerevan. It is led by Albert Movsisyan.

== History ==
The party held its founding congress on 27 March 2024 in Yerevan. The founder is the president of the Union of Freedom Fighters and Veterans and former Chairman of the Law and Unity party, Mihran Movsisyan. Meanwhile, Albert Movsisyan, a former member of the Public Voice Party and the son of Mihran Movsisyan and nephew of Arakel Movsisyan, was elected as party Chairman. During the founding congress, the party did not state whether they would be an opposition force or pro-government force, however, they did confirm the intention to participate in parliamentary elections in 2026. On 26 July 2024, the party announced that they would act as an opposition force.

The party has no political representation within the National Assembly and currently acts as an extra-parliamentary force.

== See also ==
- Programs of political parties in Armenia
