= National Democrats Union =

National Democrats Union Ազգային ժողովրդավարների միություն
- Leader: Arshak Sadoyan
- Founded: 2001
- Headquarters: Yerevan
- National affiliation: Free Homeland Alliance (2021)
- National Assembly: 0 / 107

The National Democrats Union, also known as the Alliance of National Democrats (Armenian: Ազգային ժողովրդավարների միություն, romanized: Azgayin zhoghovrdavarneri miut’yun) is an Armenian political party.

== History ==
The National Democrats Union was founded on 19 May 2001 by Arshak Sadoyan. Sadoyan was a previous member of the National Democratic Union. However, Sadoyan left the National Democratic Union to subsequently establish his own party.

On 25 May 2003, Arshak Sadoyan was elected a deputy of the National Assembly by the proportional list of the Justice electoral coalition, following the 2003 Armenian parliamentary election. Sadoyan was a member of the Justice coalition.

The party stated its intention to participate in the 2012 Armenian parliamentary elections, however, the party ultimately failed to register.

The party chose not to participate in the 2017 Armenian parliamentary election due to financial constraints. Prior to the 2018 Armenian parliamentary election, the party announced that it would be open to the idea of creating a new political alliance with other parties, however, the National Democrats Union ultimately did not participate. The party endorsed Armen Sarksyan for the presidency.

The party announced its intentions to participate in the 2021 Armenian parliamentary elections as part of the Free Homeland Alliance. Following the election, the alliance won just 0.32% of the popular vote, failing to win any seats in the National Assembly. Currently, the party acts as an extra-parliamentary force.

Arshak Sadoyan stated his opposition to either Nikol Pashinyan or Robert Kocharyan from becoming prime minister.

== Ideology ==
The party supports increased involvement of the Armenian Diaspora in the economic development of Armenia. The party also supports developing a modernized military, increasing wages, allowing the Armenian Diaspora to vote in national elections from abroad, and encourages the self-determination of Artsakh.

== Electoral record ==
=== Parliamentary elections ===
Election	Leader	Votes	%	Seats	+/–	Position	Government
2021 (Note: As part of Free Homeland Alliance.)	Arshak Sadoyan	4,119	0.32	0 / 107	0	▲16th	Extra-parliamentary

== See also ==
- Programs of political parties in Armenia
