= Democratic Homeland Party =

Democratic Homeland Party Ժողովրդավարական հայրենիք կուսակցություն
- Leader: Petros Makeyan
- Founded: 1998
- Headquarters: Yerevan, Armenia
- Ideology: Pro-democracy
- Political position: Centre
- National Assembly: 0 / 107

The Democratic Homeland Party (Armenian: Ժողովրդավարական հայրենիք կուսակցություն, romanized: Zhoghovrdavarakan Hayrenik’ kusakts’ut’yun) is an Armenian political party. The Chairman of the party is Petros Makeyan.

== History ==
The party was founded in 1988. The party withdrew its participation in the 2003 Armenian parliamentary election, over concerns of electoral corruption.

The party subsequently joined the Armenian National Congress and participated in an electoral bloc with them in the 2012 Armenian parliamentary election. The Armenian National Congress won 7 seats in the National Assembly. Prior to the 2012 election, the Democratic Homeland Party feared that the election would be rigged and proclaimed that the Republican Party of Armenia was a criminal organization. The Democratic Homeland Party eventually became skeptical of and left the Armenian National Congress.

Several party members participated in the 2013 Yerevan City Council election, under the Heritage party's Barev Yerevan alliance. The alliance came in third place, winning 8.48% of the vote.

The party currently does not have any representation in the National Assembly and acts as an extra-parliamentary force.

== Ideology ==
The party believes in developing a strong and transparent democracy in Armenia, and opposes political oligarchy. The party also opposes serving the interests of foreign powers in Armenia, at the expense of Armenia's and Artsakh's security.

== Activities ==
In March 2014, party leader Petros Makeyan stated that the Prosperous Armenia party and its leader Gagik Tsarukyan are highly corrupt and had gained political support through financial bribery.

Also in 2014, Makeyan proclaimed that Serzh Sargsyan, the leader of the Republican Party of Armenia, had been indirectly controlling the Orinats Yerkir party for years, during an interview.

In June 2019, the party sent a letter to the Prime Minister of Armenia, Nikol Pashinyan, appealing him to strengthen democracy in Armenia.

On 22 December 2020, the Democratic Homeland Party, the Conservative Party and the Union for National Self-Determination held a joint meeting discussing the political situation in Armenia.

On 26 February 2021, the party released a statement along with the Armenian Constructive Party and the Conservative Party, condemning the signing of the 2020 Nagorno-Karabakh ceasefire agreement. The three parties called for an end to Russian-Turkish interference in Armenia and Artsakh.

On 15 April 2021, the party signed a joint declaration with eight other political parties calling on the President of Armenia to ensure democracy and the Constitution of Armenia is upheld in the country during the 2020–2021 Armenian protests.

== See also ==
- Programs of political parties in Armenia
