= Tigran Torosyan =

Armenian politician

- Տիգրան Թորոսյան
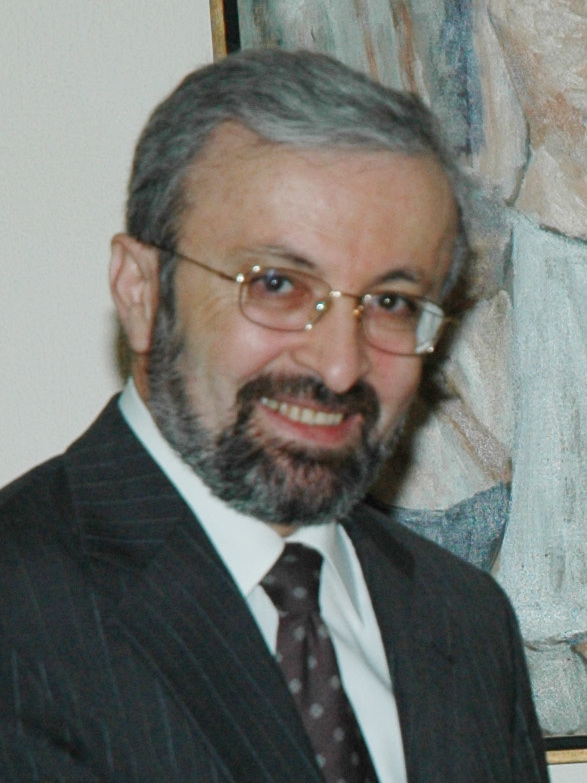
- Torosyan in 2006

President of the National Assembly
- In office June 1, 2006 – September 26, 2008
- Preceded by: Artur Baghdasaryan
- Succeeded by: Hrayr Karapetyan (acting)

Vice-President National Assembly
- In office 1999–2006
- Preceded by: Gagik Aslanian
- Succeeded by: Vahan Hovanissian

Personal details
- Born: 14 April 1956 (age 70) Yerevan, Armenian SSR, Soviet Union
- Party: None; During tenure as speaker, HHK
- Education: Yerevan Polytechnic Institute

Tigran Torosyan (Armenian: Տիգրան Սուրիկի Թորոսյանը; born April 14, 1956) was the President of the National Assembly of Armenia from 2006 to 2008. From 1993 he was a member of Republican Party of Armenia and the party board. In 1998-2008 he became a Deputy Chairman of the RPA board. On June 1, 2006, he was elected President of the National Assembly of Armenia. He resigned from office in 2008 after growing differences between him and other officials from the RPA, including president Serge Sargsyan which also led him to quit the party. Torosyan is married and has one daughter.
