= 2008 Armenian presidential election protests =

March 1 events
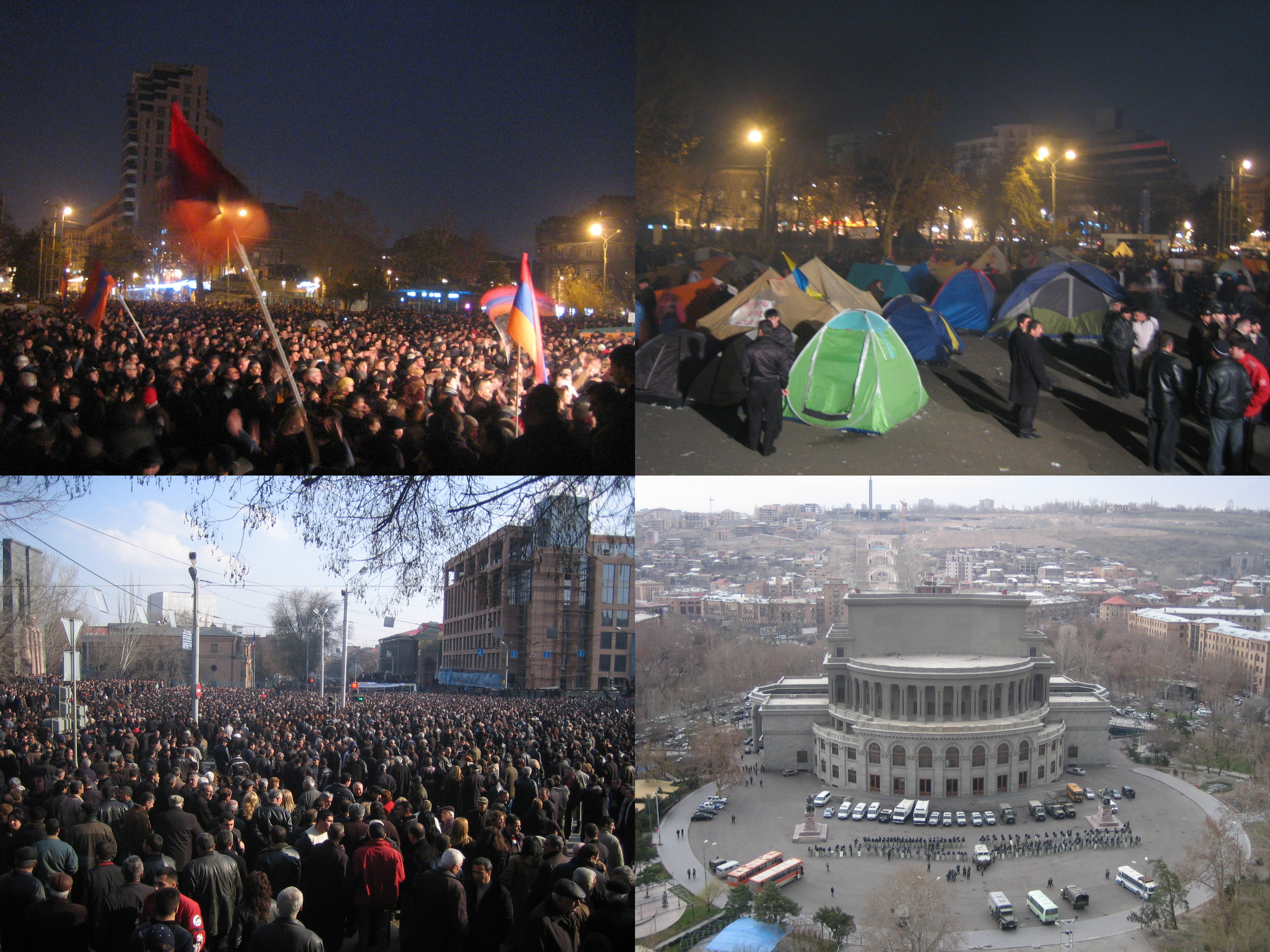
- Protests at Freedom Square on 24 February, tents set up by protesters, demonstrations at Myasnikyan Square on 1 March. Police forces occupying the Freedom Square weeks after the forcible suppression on 23 March.
- Date: 20 February – 2 March 2008 (11 days)
- Location: Yerevan, Armenia
- Caused by: Alleged electoral fraud
- Goals: New elections
- Result: Peaceful protests suppressed by force: 10 people killed; Levon Ter-Petrosyan put under house arrest; 20-day state of emergency declared; Media blackout; Freedom Square closed for protesters until 17 March 2011; Over 100 opposition activists arrested until May 2011

Parties
Opposition parties: Pan-Armenian National Movement; People's Party of Armenia; Heritage; Hanrapetutyun; Impeachment Union; Yerkrapah (partly)	Government of Armenia; Police; National Security Service; Armed Forces of Armenia; Pro-government parties: Republican Party of Armenia; Prosperous Armenia; Armenian Revolutionary Federation; Orinats Yerkir

Lead figures
Levon Ter-Petrosyan; Nikol Pashinyan; Stepan Demirchyan; Hrant Bagratyan; Aram Sargsyan; Raffi Hovannisian; Khachatur Sukiasyan	Robert Kocharyan (incumbent president); Serzh Sargsyan (Prime Minister, president-elect); Mikael Harutyunyan (Defence Minister); Seyran Ohanyan (Chief of General Sraff); Gorik Hakobyan (Head of the NSS); Hayk Harutyunyan (Head of the police)

Number
50,000 (Feb. 20)	up to few thousand policemen/soldiers

Casualties
- Deaths: 10 (8 protesters, 1 policeman, 1 soldier)
- Injuries: 200
- Arrested: 106
- 7 shops looted 63 vehicles set on fire

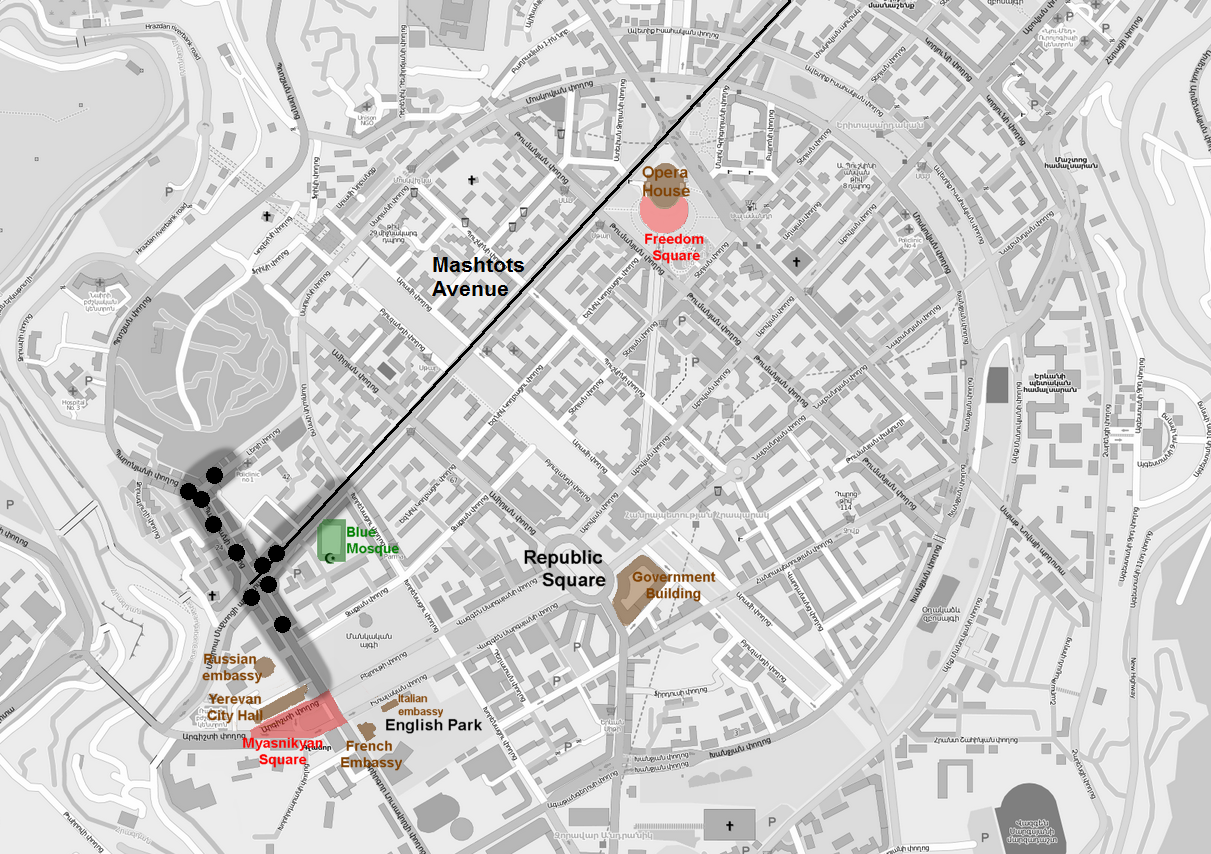
Main locations of the demonstrations, black dots denote the locations of the fatalities.

A series of anti-government riots took place in Armenia following presidential elections held on 19 February 2008. Protests broke out in the Armenian capital Yerevan, organized by supporters of presidential candidate and former president Levon Ter-Petrosyan and other opposition leaders.

The protests began on 20 February, lasted for 10 days in Yerevan's Freedom Square, and involved tens of thousands of demonstrators during the day and hundreds camping out overnight. Despite the urges of the government to stop the demonstrations, the protests continued until 1 March. After nine days of peaceful protests at Freedom Square, the national police and military forces tried to disperse the protesters on 1 March. On the morning of 1 March, police and army units dispersed the 700 to 1,000 protesters who remained overnight, beating them with truncheons and electric-shock devices. As a result, 10 people were killed. As of 4 March, many protesters were still missing. On 1 March, Ter-Petrosyan was placed under de facto house arrest.

At noon on 1 March, a crowd of at least 10,000 protesters held a rally in front of the French embassy in Yerevan. Police officers pulled away from the area by 4 pm, as they were overwhelmed by the growing number of demonstrators. Activists then used abandoned police buses to set up barricades. In the evening, clashes broke out between riot police and about 2,000 protesters who barricaded themselves at Miasnikyan Square. At around 10 pm, President Robert Kocharyan, with the approval of the Armenian parliament, declared a 20-day state of emergency, banning future demonstrations and censoring the media from broadcasting any political news except those issued by official state press releases. Kocharian justified the decision on the grounds that a minority of demonstrators looted a nearby grocery store on Mashtots Avenue and set fire to a handful of police vehicles and buses Opposition leaders say that the looters had nothing to do with the demonstration, and that they were led by agent provocateurs. With the state of emergency in effect, at around 4:00 on 2 March, Levon Ter-Petrosyan asked the protesters near the French Embassy to go home, thus ending the protests.

The events of 1 March 2008 are simply referred to as Marti mek (Armenian: Մարտի մեկ "March First") in Armenia.

== Background ==
Levon Ter-Petrosyan was the President of Armenia from 16 October 1991 to 3 February 1998. Ter-Petrosyan was forced to step down in February 1998 for a number of reasons, including allegations of election fraud and generally having lost support in the parliament. He was succeeded by his then Prime Minister Robert Kocharyan. Kocharyan was re-elected for a second term as president on 5 March 2003 amid allegations of electoral fraud. In early 2004 there were demonstrations by opposition-led protestors and calls for Kocharyan's resignation. Kocharyan completed his second term as president in February 2008 and under the Armenian constitution was not eligible for a third term. Kocharyan's Prime Minister Serge Sargsyan had Kocharyan's backing for his candidacy as the next president. Ter-Petrosyan was also a candidate for this election, having announced his candidacy during a speech in Yerevan on 26 October 2007, in which he accused Kocharyan's government of massive corruption involving the theft of "at least three to four billion dollars" over the previous five years. The election was held on 19 February 2008 and Sargsyan won the election with 53% of the vote, according to official results, with Ter-Petrosyan in second place with 22% of the vote. Under Armenia's electoral law, if neither candidate wins at least 50% of the votes, the top two contenders have to face each other in a second round of the elections. International observers from the Organization for Security and Co-operation in Europe, PACE and the European Parliament had said that "the presidential election in Armenia mostly satisfied the international standards".

== Timeline ==
The protests began on 20 February; about 25,000 opposition supporters were reportedly present on 21 February. Ter-Petrosyan said that the army would not act against the protesters, claiming to have the support of two deputy defense ministers. An aide to Ter-Petrosyan vowed that the protests would continue "nonstop" and demanded that the government agree to holding a new election by 22 February. On 21 February, two members of the Central Election Commission who are representatives of the opposition said that they did not accept the results, and on the next day, Vahan Hovhannisian resigned from his position as deputy speaker of National Assembly of Armenia due to his disapproval of the handling of the election and said that the mechanism of falsifications were put in operation in 1996 by Ter-Petrosyan. Protests continued on 22 February, and Deputy Prosecutor-General Gagik Jhangirian condemned the election, urging the people to act immediately to defend their votes, rather than complaining later about the government's behavior. A spokesperson for Prosecutor-General Aghvan Hovsepian asked Kocharyan to dismiss Jhangirian because prosecutors cannot be members of any party or to be involved in politics in any way The Defense Ministry denied Ter-Petrosyan's claim that the two deputy defense ministers had said that they would prevent the army from being used against the protesters, but the veterans' group Yerkrapah disputed this denial.

Protests were held without an official permission. Part of the cause for the protest were oppositions claim that there were widespread violations, and the suppression of this belief. Armenian Public Television (H1) has received criticism for failing to show the intense protesting, instead promoting a peaceful aura following the election.

=== 22 February ===
On the third day of the protests, 22 February, the number of protesters was reported as about 30,000. Sarkisyan called the protests "blackmail' and said that if they violated the law, order would be restored through force. The opposition's Alexander Arzoumanian, however, said that the government did not have the courage to attempt to break up the protests. On 23 February, the number of protesters was reported as about 50,000. Kocharyan accused the opposition of trying to seize power and warned that the government would act to preserve order. Meanwhile, the police released a statement saying that they were "prepared to resolutely respond to any attempts to disturb public order and destabilize the situation, prevent extremist manifestations, and protect people's constitutional rights". The statement denied the rumored resignation of police chief Hayk Harutyunyan.

=== 23 February ===
Jhangirian was dismissed as Deputy Prosecutor-General by Kocharyan on 23 February and detained later that day. On 27 February Gagik Jahangiryan was arrested and accused of violating the article 235.1 of the Armenia Penal Code (illegal purchase, traffic and storage of weapons, explosive assemblies) and article 316.1 (application of force against a public agent).

=== 25 February ===
25 February saw steady numbers of protesters at Opera Square during the day, estimated at 40,000–50,000. Ter-Petrosyan made several appearances, and in each called for a peaceful rally, frequently alluding to the late-1980s when the Karabakh Committee was arrested by the Soviets. Ter-Petrosyan said that he does not fear arrest nor assassination, and that if the ruling party had him killed, it would only accelerate its own demise. Also on 25 February, Sarkis Hatspanian, a diasporan Armenian from France, spoke twice, and alluded to the participation of Armenians in revolutionary movements in France and Germany, and how the turn has come for Armenia. Around 10–15,000 people continued to participate in the rally well into midnight, some staying overnight in tents.

=== 26 February ===
On 26 February, there were widespread reports that high school administrators had been directed by the ruling party to have their students participate in a pro-Sargsyan rally held in Republic Square. Many e-mail services had been blocked since the morning of 26 February, including Hotmail, Gmail, and thick-client email programs using the IMAP protocol.

Several prominent supporters of Ter-Petrosyan were arrested on 26 February. On that day competing rallies were held, with Sargysan's supporters reported to number up to 100,000. Ter-Petrosyan claimed that the numbers attending his rally had doubled because people were leaving Sargysan's rally to come to his. Meanwhile, the National Security Service said that it had prevented an opposition plot to seize a television broadcasting tower in Yerevan; it said that the purpose of this alleged plot, for which several people were arrested, was to enable Ter-Petrosyan to make a live broadcast. An opposition spokesman dismissed this as "psychological pressure". Also on 26 February, Kocharyan suggested that his government's patience with the protests had "a limit" and urged people to "come to their senses".

=== 27 February ===
On 27 February, an even larger group of protesters than previous days marched on the streets along Abovian and Mashdots Avenue. The evening again saw protester numbers in the tens of thousands, with an increasing number of tents. The crowd was mixed, there were groups of villagers (tens in each), students, families with children, government workers, in addition to opposition leaders. At around 11:30 pm some protesters started to rush towards the café adjacent to Freedom Square named "Karapi Lij" (Swan Lake). A protest leader announced that all available journalists should go there to photograph "something interesting" that was about to happen, and also called for the general populace to return to the square. Several score of military police, civil police, as well as secret police went into the subterranean café, emerging after 15–20 minutes with 3 arrested suspects who were secret agent provocateurs with undercover recording equipment trying to get opposition leaders (who were in the café) to say or perform illegal acts. Armenia's National Security Service (NSS) acknowledged that the agents urging the opposition leaders to resort to violence were its employees. Secret police (which outnumbered uniformed police and military 3 to 1) would not allow journalists to take pictures; however, some were able to (despite their threats of impending danger to journalists' personal safety or destruction of their cameras). The rally later continued without interruption.

=== 28 February ===
On 28 February, starting from the morning, police cars surrounded the streets around Freedom Square, not allowing passengers to be dropped off or picked up, let alone to park.

=== 29 February ===
On 29 February, another march around town attracted an even larger group of ralliers, with at least 100,000 participants. At night, there were 132 tents set up in Freedom Square and occupied by 24-hour protesters.

=== 1 March ===
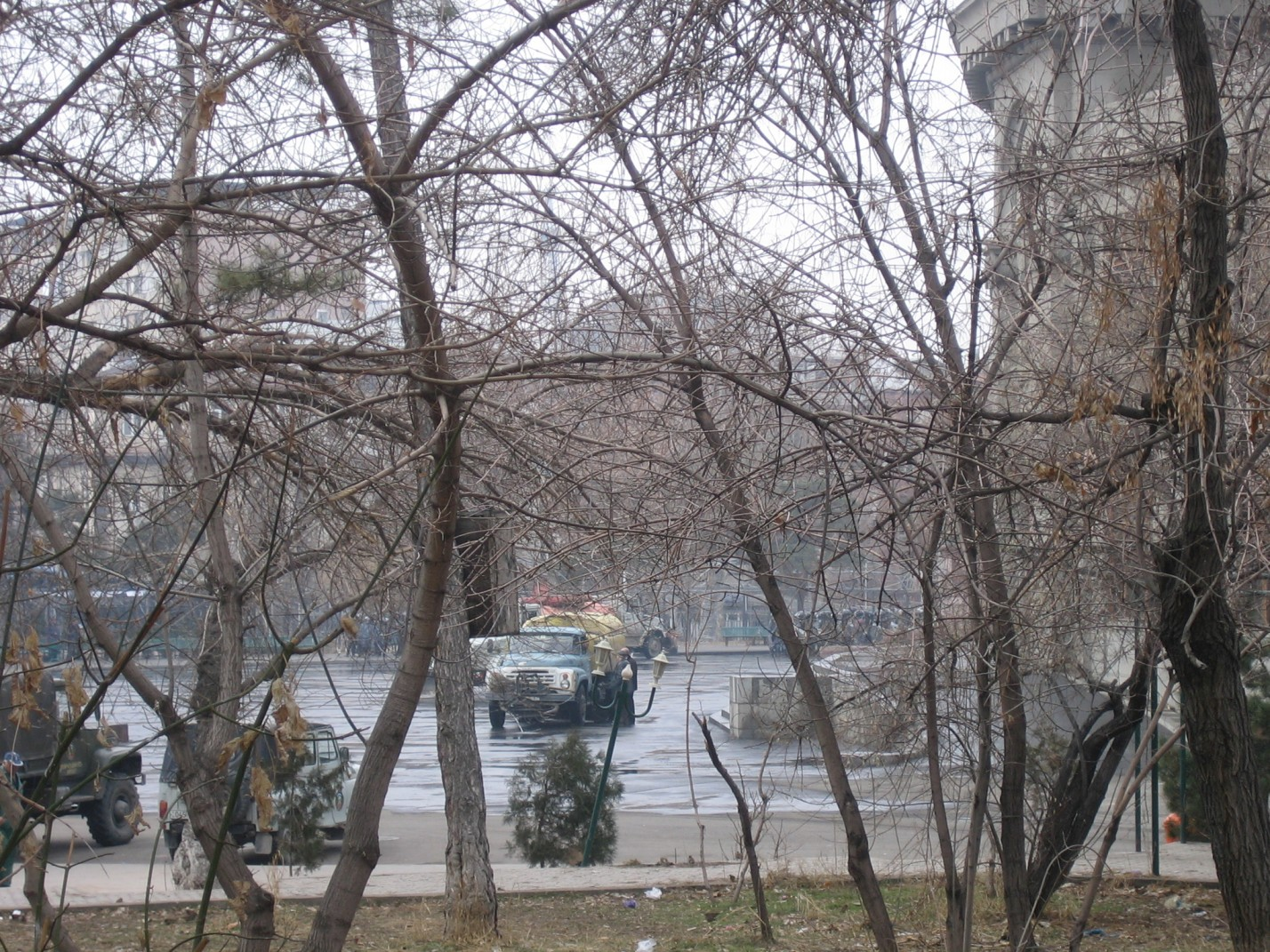
Noon: A water tanker cleans Opera Square of debris and blood after the government's crackdown

On 1 March, at 7:30 am, Armenian security forces violently dispersed the protesters, who were then reported to number about 700–1,000, and broke up a tented camp being used by the protesters in Freedom Square. Witnesses say that the government authorities planted guns and grenades among the sleeping protesters, and then claiming that they were thwarting an attempted coup, attacked the protesters. Police used bludgeons and electric shockers to beat and electrocute the ralliers. Levon Ter-Petrosyan was captured at Freedom Square and placed under house arrest. Some fled when police attacked them. Dozens were reported to have sustained severe injuries and more than 100 protesters were arrested. A witness told Human Rights Watch that several rows of Special Forces in riot armor, with helmets, plastic shields and rubber truncheons, started approaching from the left and right sides of Freedom Square. The witness said that police, without prior warning, sprayed water and descended on the demonstrators, using rubber truncheons and electric prods. "People started running towards Northern Avenue, but were chased by the police." By 11:00 am, Freedom Square was completely cordoned off by police and large water cannons were being used to clear the site of debris and blood (with riot police trying to prevent passersby from taking photographs). The Karapi Lich café was cordoned off with a large canvas so that it could not be seen what took place inside.

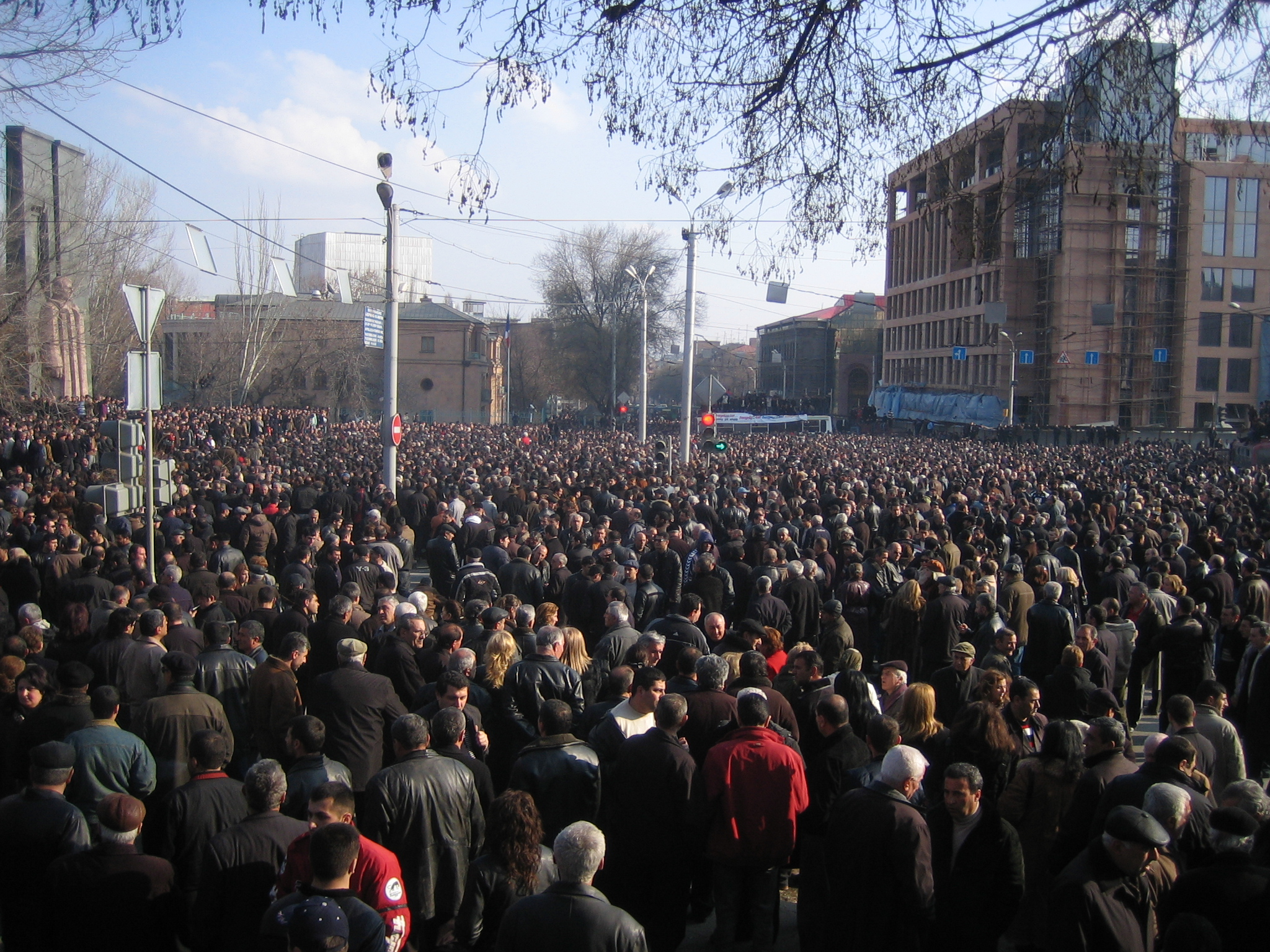
4:30 pm: Over 100,000 demonstrators at French Embassy protest the government's attack in early morning

At about 11:30 am, a peaceful march of about 1,000 people from near Freedom Square, down North Avenue, and to the French Embassy at Miyasnikyan Square (where riot police were quickly redeployed to). By 1:30 pm, a police armored personnel carrier was brought in, which the growing crowd quickly surrounded. By 2 pm, about 150,000 protesters—larger than on any other day—had gathered in the square. By that time there were about 3,000 riot police and special police forces present. The sheer number of protesters outnumbered the police, who were forced by the peaceful protesters to retreat. By 5 pm, all armored personnel carriers and all other military special vehicles as well as troops had been evacuated from the square. Protesters gradually confiscated the remaining buses and moved them to strategic locations to block incoming traffic to the square. It is notable that several agent provocateurs were detected by the crowd and swiftly removed. At around 3:30 pm, an unmarked white police car drove straight through the crowd at high speed. At least two women were run over and taken to hospital with injuries. The car was stopped by the crowd and set afire, as the policeman driving it fled the scene.

As of 6:30 pm, at least 30 buses, each with about 30 army soldiers armed with AK-47 and M-16 assault rifles, were seen near Republic Square (in anticipation of Kocharian's state of emergency).

Around 10:30 pm, Kocharyan declared a 20-day state of emergency. This meant that "all rallies and other public gatherings will be banned in Yerevan until March 20. It also places serious restrictions on press freedom, with local media outlets allowed to report only official news communiqués."

Clashes between the police and security forces and agitated protesters seem to have occurred on at least three occasions during the course of 1 March: The first in the morning hours, the second at around 9:15 pm, and the third late night. According to eyewitnesses (among them an RFE/RL correspondent) security forces—without prior warning—fired tracer bullets over the crowd for more than 40 minutes in an attempt to disperse the crowd (this is confirmed in an independent YouTube video). In the meantime, a unit of riot troops charged towards one of the barricades but fled the scene after unsuccessful pitched battles with opposition supporters who were armed with sticks, stones and Molotov cocktails.

Shortly after the event, a controversial independent video appeared on YouTube showing special forces firing automatic weapons directly into the crowd, directly followed by a clip in which the Prosecutor General's press secretary (Sona Truzyan) claims that police did not fire any weapons into the crowd. Government sources claimed that the video footage was faked and that it was digitally doctored.

=== 2 March ===
==== Midnight and early morning ====
By 12:00 am, the area around the French embassy had only about 5,000 activists left. The police stood about 1/2 km north at Shahumyan Square, passively watching as anarchy reigned on the area below. Miyasnikyan square to Mashdots Avenue was completely devoid of any law enforcement, and authorities watched passively as some of the crowd looted some stores. Despite calls from opposition leaders throughout the demonstrations to restrain the use of violence, some in the crowd (allegedly encouraged by agent provocateurs) resorted to property destruction (of cars, windows, public places) and looting of a grocery store and a shoe store. (ArmeniaNow reports that the 2 pharmacies and 4 electronics and computer stores were not looted.) By 1:00 am, several buses and cars had been destroyed, set ablaze, or turned over near Miyasnikyan square. By 2:30 am, some of the bus loads of army soldiers were bused into Shahumyan square to join rows of riot police. Demonstrators were seen armed with metal bars (removed from park gates) and Molotov cocktails made from water bottles.

Many of the demonstrators were not there to specifically support Levon Ter-Petrosyan, but were there to show their support for a change in government. Only a minority of the group resorted to looting, and most of the crowd stayed within the vicinity of Miyasnikyan Square.

Official reports say that ten people died on the night of 1 March; however, according to representatives of non-governmental organizations, the official number of injured civilians may be underreported, as several of those injured were turned away from hospitals and medical clinics on 1 March. According to the information given by the Head of Police and Prosecutor General, a police officer died trying to prevent a hand grenade from going off. Three civilians died from teargas cartridge and four from bullets. The Prosecutor General stated that the ammunitions had penetrated the bodies, which appears to indicate that they must have been fired at a very close range.

According to the Head of Police some protesters were armed with wooden sticks, iron sticks and "hedgehogs". He also stated that the protesters used fire arms – but this was contested by the representatives of the opposition who met with the Council of Europe's Commissioner for Human Rights.

==== Day time ====
As of 9 am, Ter-Petrosyan urged his supporters to go home from the protest, citing Kocharian's state of emergency. The government alleged that protesters were carrying firearms. However, other than metal bars and some Molotov cocktails, no reporters had seen arms in the possession of protesters.

By 11 am, at least a dozen army armored personnel carriers and about 500 soldiers wielding assault rifles were positioned in Republic Square, maintaining the state of emergency's policy of a ban on public demonstrations and meetings. The stage at Freedom Square has been surrounded by 6 army transportation trucks. Photography was strictly prohibited.

Yerevan was said to be all but a ghost town, with soldiers outnumbering citizens.

The National Assembly confirmed Kocharyan's state of emergency, with 81 of the 131 members of parliament present voting in favor of it.

=== 21 March ===
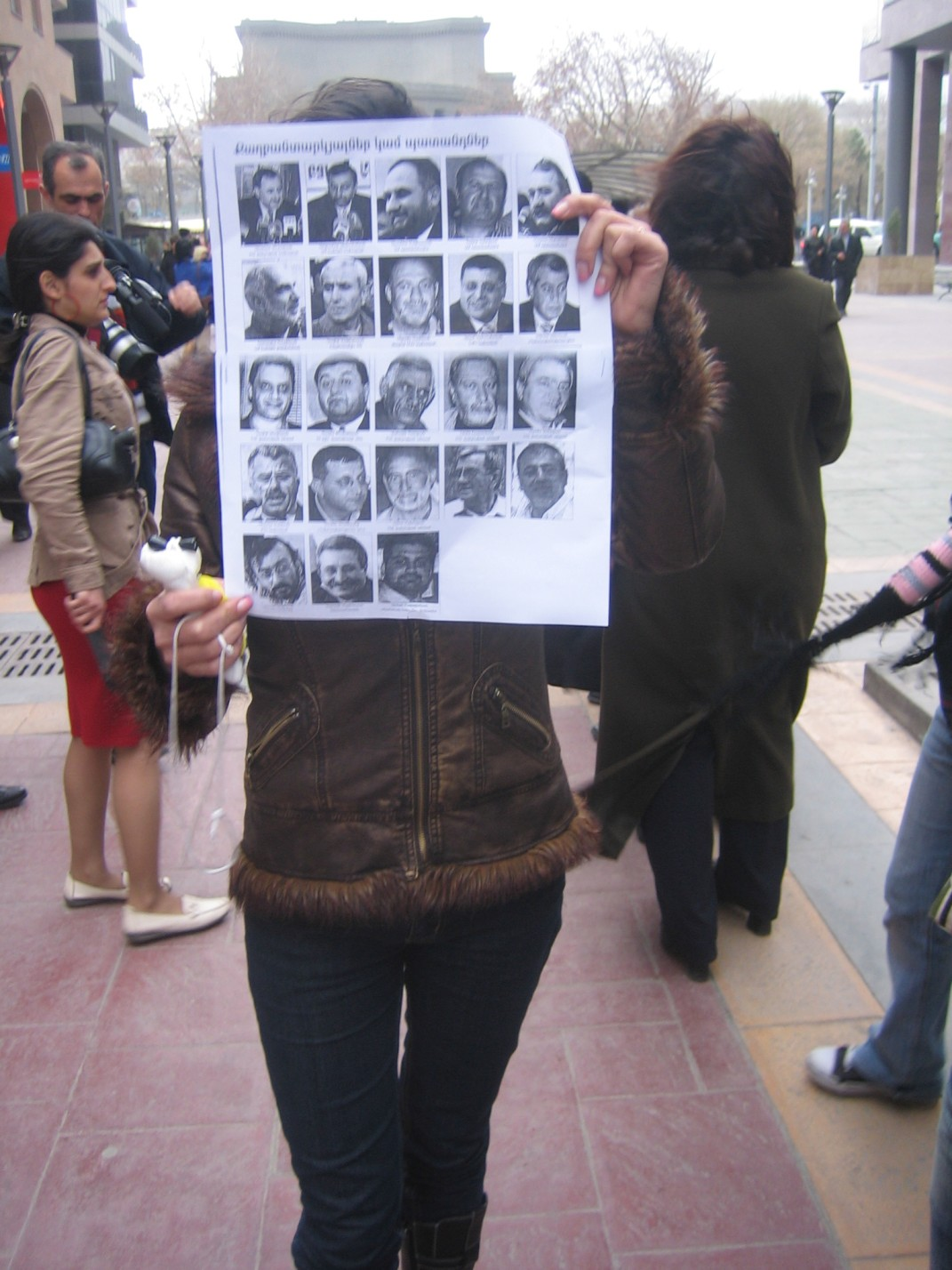
In a silent protest, a young woman holds pictures of some of the 106 political prisoners

Following the end of the state of emergency, thousands of people in Yerevan held a candlelight vigil for the victims of 1 March and a silent protest on 21 March 2008 to protest the 106 protesters who had been arrested in the original protests. Their plan was to assemble at Freedom Square at 3 pm and hold a candlelight vigil there for those who died on 1 March, followed by a silent protest from 5 pm to 7 pm of a single line stretching from Freedom Square, down Northern Avenue, to Myasnikian Square. However, riot police confronted the protesters and used force to disperse them. Senior police officers told protesters to leave the area and cross the streets surrounding it, citing a continuing government ban on rallies. "Ten people standing together means a rally, and I have the right to disperse a rally," Major-General Sasha Afian, deputy chief of Armenia's Police Service, told a group of angry women.

Freedom Square was occupied by busloads of police and interior troops who prevented citizens to enter Freedom Square; Shahumyan Square and Myasnikian Square similarly had rows of riot police who prevented a public assembly in the area. At 7 p.m. the assembled crowds of silent protesters dispersed as planned. Although the state of emergency has been lifted by law, the ban on public rallies is de facto still in place.

On the same day, the following campaign team members of Levon Ter-Petrosyan were taken into custody: Vardan Galstyan, Davit Tzaghikyan, Onik Hakobyan, Suren Sujyan, Edvard Sarajanyan and Hakob Semirjyan.

=== 22 March ===
Riot police continue to block public access to Freedom Square, Shahumyan Square, and Myasnikian Square; they were also in formation at Republic Square. Police dispersed a growing crowd—mostly composed of women—that was assembling at Northern Avenue. A Reuters reporter was notified by the police that any attempt by the public to hold a similar "silent protest" as the day before would be met by resistance from the police.

== State of Emergency ==
Late in the evening on 1 March, President Kocharian declared a State of Emergency in the capital Yerevan for twenty days. The National Parliament endorsed the Presidential decree on Declaration of state of emergency the following day, 2 March. The State of Emergency entered into force immediately. The decree established the following temporary limitations under the State of Emergency:

- It banned meeting, rallies, demonstrations, marches and other mass events;
- It banned strikes and other actions that could stop or suspend the activities of organizations;
- It limited the movement of individuals and the means of transportation and authorized inspections by the law enforcement bodies;
- It stipulates that mass media outlets could provide information on state and internal affairs only within the parameters of official information provided by state bodies;
- It banned political propaganda through leaflets or other means without due permission from relevant state bodies;
- It suspended temporarily the activity of political parties and other public organizations that impede the elimination of the circumstances that served as the grounds for declaring a State of Emergency;
- It authorized the removal from a given area those who violate the legal state of emergency regime and do not reside there, doing so at their own expense, or, in case of absence of means, using state budget resources to be refunded afterwards.

=== Ban on public gatherings ===
The Armenian military is maintaining a strict ban on public gatherings of even the smallest size.

=== Media censorship ===
Under the state of emergency, mass media can only publish official government news.

Several opposition media have been shut down, including A1plus and Haykakan Zhamanak.

Radio Free Europe/Radio Liberty's Armenia Liberty radio service has been terminated by the Armenian authorities. The radio service's airings were at first accessible from their website at http://www.armenialiberty.org, but since 6 March even this website has been blocked by the Armenian government.

=== Internet censorship ===
In the evening of 2 March, the Internet Society of Armenia (ISOC) froze the Internet domain name server entries in its DNS servers for several domains, including:

- http://www.a1plus.am – domain of the opposition newspaper A1+ (news last updated 1 March can be retrieved outside of Armenia at because A1+'s web servers are hosted outside of Armenia; the IP is unreachable within Armenia)
- www.armtimes.com website of the opposition newspaper Haykakan Zhamanak (editor-in-chief Nikol Pashinyan); its Yerevan-based ISP has disabled the account, although its IP remains available (http://217.113.0.244/)
- www.azatutyun.am – domain of RFE/RL's Armenia Liberty news service (it can still be accessed at http://www.armenialiberty.org from within Armenia)
- http://www.echannel.am

The YouTube web site was blocked from 6 to 13 March; all IP addresses of https://www.youtube.com (208.65.153.253, 208.65.153.238, and 208.65.153.251) were unreachable from within Armenia during this time. YouTube hosts a1plusnews as well as ArmeniaLiberty Channel in addition to numerous eyewitness videos of the events of 1 and 2 March.

As of the evening of 6 March, the IP addresses hosting the following web sites have been blocked by Armenian authorities:

- http://www.rferl.org – website of RFE/RL
- http://www.armenialiberty.org/ – main website of RFE/RL's Armenian Liberty
- https://web.archive.org/web/20080409213043/http://zhamanak.com/ Zhamanak Armenian-American Political Daily (IP: 208.109.78.130)
- https://web.archive.org/web/20080308190621/http://www.payqar.net/ and http://levonforpresident.com/ Opposition websites (IP: 64.14.73.15)

As of 7 March, the websites of RFE/RL and Armenia Liberty were once again accessible from within Armenia, but as of the morning of 8 March, they are once again inaccessible. As of May 2009, several major websites were still blocked and/or disabled.

== Government response ==
The President Elect Sargsian, during his meeting with EU special envoy for the South Caucasus Peter Semneby, said "We are ready to cooperate with all those who wants Armenia to develop, its citizens to prosper, the country to be stable and strong, and we are ready for an open, straightforward and honest discussion". He also said that "those who incited recent riots had committed a crime and should be punished". The Incumbent President Kocharian said that "Armenian authorities were seeking to normalise the situation as soon as possible and restore stability".

Government officials have portrayed the events of 1 March purely as an attempted coup by the opposition. At least 97 Ter-Petrosyan supporters have been jailed by authorities since the election, and have been charged with organizing "mass riots" and attempting to overthrow the government. The government-controlled National Assembly stripped four deputies allied to Ter-Petrosyan of their legal immunity from prosecution.

On 3 March, the Human Rights Defender of Armenia, Armen Harutyunyan, issued a report critical of President Kocharyan's order of force.

=== New law banning rallies ===
The President and the Prime Minister expressed their wish to have the State of Emergency ended on 21 March. They were however concerned over the possibility of new demonstrations, rallies and riots in the streets. In this context, on 17 March, the Parliament initiated a first reading of proposed amendments to the law on holding meetings, rallies, marches, and demonstrations in an extraordinary session.

On 18 March, President Robert Kocharian signed into law a parliament bill that will make it easier for the Armenian authorities to ban fresh anti-government demonstrations planned by opposition leader Levon Ter-Petrosyan.

The existing law had until then allowed authorities to ban those demonstrations which they believed were aimed, among other things, at a "violent overthrow of constitutional order". One of the amendments of the new law complements the clause with cases where authorities have "reliable information" that street protests would pose a threat to "state security, public order, public health and morality", and that any such information coming from the Armenian police and the National Security Service (NSS) will be automatically deemed "reliable".

Also, a more significant amendment to the existing law allows the authorities to "temporarily" ban rallies for an unspecified period of time after street gatherings resulting in casualties. The ban shall remain in force until the end of the official investigation into a particular case of deadly street violence. Furthermore, the amendments also stipulate that a responsible agency examine a request for holding a public event for 72 hours. Requests are to be submitted 5 days prior to the date of holding a public event.

According to the Council of Europe, these amendments entail "important changes and serious restrictions on the current national regime of freedom of assembly". Previously the municipal authorities only needed to be notified of the intent to hold rallies, demonstrations or manifestations. According to the Council of Europe, the amendments full conformity with article 11 paragraph 2 (the right to freedom of assembly and association) of the European Convention can be questioned.

In addition to Sarkisian's Republican Party (HHK), parliamentary leaders of the Prosperous Armenia, Dashnaktsutyun and Orinats Yerkir parties supported the new bill; Only members of Zharangutyun, the sole opposition party represented in the parliament, and independent lawmaker Victor Dallakian voted against the legislation.

== Response of coalition government parties ==
Artur Baghdasarian, leader of the Rule of Law party and former opposition leader who switched sides after the election, and Gagik Tsarukian, leader of the Prosperous Armenia Party made a joint statement with Sarkisian where they blamed the deadly clashes on Ter-Petrosyan, claiming that they had been "methodically and cruelly" planned by Ter-Petrosyan beforehand as part of his plan to illegally seize power.

In a 3 March statement, the Armenian Revolutionary Federation defended the deadly use of force against thousands of Ter-Petrosyan supporters who demonstrated in Yerevan on 1 March and called the protest an attempted coup d'état.

== Opposition response ==
Opposition leaders who organized the rally disavowed and condemned 1 March's looting of dozens of a nearby supermarket and burning of parked cars, blaming them on government "provocateurs". "We have nothing to do with that," said Nikol Pashinian, an opposition leader. "The authorities themselves are destabilizing the situation."

During his 11 March news conference, Ter-Petrosyan alleged that government agents provoked the unrest. "Not even one car had been scratched [during protests and marches] prior to March 1. So what happened?" Ter-Petrosyan said, according to a report distributed by the Regnum news agency. "Provocateurs went after the protesters with clubs. ... That was the reason the situation spiraled out of control, although it was brilliantly managed by authorities."

During the weekend of 15–16 March, Ter-Petrosyan and his opposition allies remaining at large held a meeting for the first time since the 1 March government attack, and said they will continue to work for regime change in Armenia by "legal and democratic means". Ter-Petrosyan's office said that the participants of the meeting "reaffirmed their determination to fight against the kleptocratic system." During the week of 10 March, the Ter-Petrosyan's representatives requested permission from Yerevan mayor's office to hold a rally on 21 March (the day after the anticipated end of emergency rule); this request has been rejected.

Raffi Hovannisian's Zharangutyun party said in a statement that "the schism between the Armenian people and its government continues to expand," that the presidential ballot was fraudulent and that Armenians had a legitimate right to dispute its official results in the streets. It said the 1 March bloodshed resulted from the break-up of non-stop protests in Yerevan's Freedom Square staged by the Ter-Petrosyan camp. "The unconscionability displayed on February 19 and the brutality used to protect it on March 1 remain unresolved issues," said the statement. "No state of emergency, accompanied as it is by an aggressive, one-sided 'public information' vertical which deepens the public divide rather than healing it, will succeed in securing the collective amnesia of state and society."

=== Response to new law banning rallies ===
On 18 March, Levon Ter-Petrosyan rejected as unconstitutional the new amendments to Armenia's law (passed at an emergency session of the National Assembly on 17 March) that will make it easier for authorities to ban new anti-government demonstrations. In a statement, his office said that the enacted amendments "blatantly violate" Armenians' constitutionally guaranteed freedom of assembly and can therefore be ignored by citizens. "In these circumstances, it is the people's legitimate right to ignore the illegal ban and reaffirm their freedom to hold rallies which is guaranteed by the constitution and international law." "In reality, this is an attempt to perpetuate the state of emergency," Levon Zurabian, an aide to Ter-Petrosyan, told RFE/RL. "A regime which attacked peaceful demonstrators and whose illegal actions left many people dead is using its own crime as a pretext to restrict our people's right to hold peaceful rallies... This shows that the authorities are terrified by the existing situation and that they admit having no popular support"

== Response of media ==
ArmeniaNow has announced that it will remain under a media blackout until the State of Emergency has been suspended, because it feels that the "latest changes in Yerevan's State of Emergency still leave wide control and leeway for media censorship which has already been exercised in state restrictions of newspapers on the first day of the revised provisions."

== International reaction ==
The European Union and some Western governments have demanded from the Armenian government a lifting of the 20-day state of emergency.

On 2 March, Holly Cartner, Europe and Central Asia director at Human Rights Watch said in a statement: "The Armenian government should refrain from using violence and make clear that it won’t tolerate excessive use of force by police... A political crisis doesn’t give the government carte blanche in how it responds to demonstrators." "The Armenian government prides itself on having a democratic image," said Cartner. "Beating peaceful demonstrators is inconsistent with that image and violates its obligations under human rights law." In a second statement, Cartner said, "The Armenian government should swiftly investigate whether the police and army used lethal force against protesters in accordance with international standards. While the government has a duty to maintain civic order, lethal force may only be used when strictly necessary to protect life."

On 3 March, the Committee to Protect Journalists said that Armenian authorities "should immediately lift restrictions on independent news reporting and the censorship of independent news Web sites." "We're alarmed by this blatant attempt to censor news of the disputed election," CPJ Executive Director Joel Simon said. "We call on Armenian authorities to withdraw the ban on independent news gathering and dissemination, and restore access to independent and opposition media."

On 5 March, the Broadcasting Board of Governors (BBG), which oversees all non-military U.S. international broadcasting, said it "strongly objects to the blackout of independent media in Armenia." "Censorship and harassment of the media are the antithesis of democracy," said James K. Glassman, Chairman of the BBG.

On 7 March, Kurt Volker, the US acting assistant secretary of state for European and Eurasian Affairs, said in an interview with Radio Free Europe/Radio Liberty: "We don't believe that [a] further crackdown, further arrests, are the right way to go." He went on to urge the immediate lifting of the state of emergency imposed by Kocharian on 1 March.

Before his 13 March trip to Armenia, Thomas Hammarberg, the Council of Europe's visiting commissioner for human rights, said "I am concerned about the human rights situation in Armenia and the consequences of the declaration of the state of emergency... It is urgent to restore a situation where the activities of the media, political parties and non-governmental organisations are not hindered."

On 12 March, the European Union reiterated its calls for the Armenian authorities to lift the state of emergency in Yerevan, release all political prisoners and agree to an "independent investigation" into the country's deadly post-election unrest. The government of Slovenia, holder of the EU's rotating presidency, also said on behalf of the block, "The Presidency calls again upon the Armenian authorities to release citizens detained in connection with their political activities and to refrain from further arrests of opposition leaders."

On 14 March, Thomas Hammarberg, the Council of Europe's Commissioner for Human Rights, called for an independent investigation into Armenia's deadly post-election unrest and said opposition supporters arrested by the authorities in recent weeks have been ill-treated in custody. "There have been cases where there were problems... Some of those arrested have been beaten, which of course is not acceptable" he said after his meetings in Armenian prisons of the political prisoners. Hammarberg "appeared to have serious misgivings about the official version of events". "I really think that there is a need for a professional, independent and impartial inquiry into what happened," he said, adding that it should be conducted by special commission made up of individuals "trusted by the public". Hammarberg also told Kocharian and Sarkisian that the recent day's easing of civil liberty restrictions stemming from the state of emergency in Yerevan is "not sufficient" and specifically urged them to abolish "censorship" of the Armenian media.

On 18 March, after a 3-day visit to Armenia, Thomas Hammarberg called on the Armenian government to lift emergency measures, ensure media freedom and initiate an impartial investigation into recent violent acts. "The State of Emergency should be lifted in Armenia and an independent, impartial and transparent inquiry initiated to clarify what actually happened during the confrontations in Yerevan between the police and opposition demonstrators on 1 March," he said.

On 20 March, the Council of Europe's Commissioner for Human Rights released a report summarizing his findings during his 12–15 March trip to Armenia. The report is critical of the government's abuse of force, stating, "It seems clear that excessive use of force was used by police and the security forces." According to the report the two sides—government authorities and opposition protesters—describe the events of 1 March "very differently". Since it is important in a human rights perspective to establish the basic facts, the report calls for a "comprehensive inquiry" that is "independent, impartial and transparent and perceived as credible by the whole population". Also, it criticized the behavior of riot police, stating, "A review seems necessary of the current riot control measures used by the police as serious mistakes were made."

== Aftermath ==
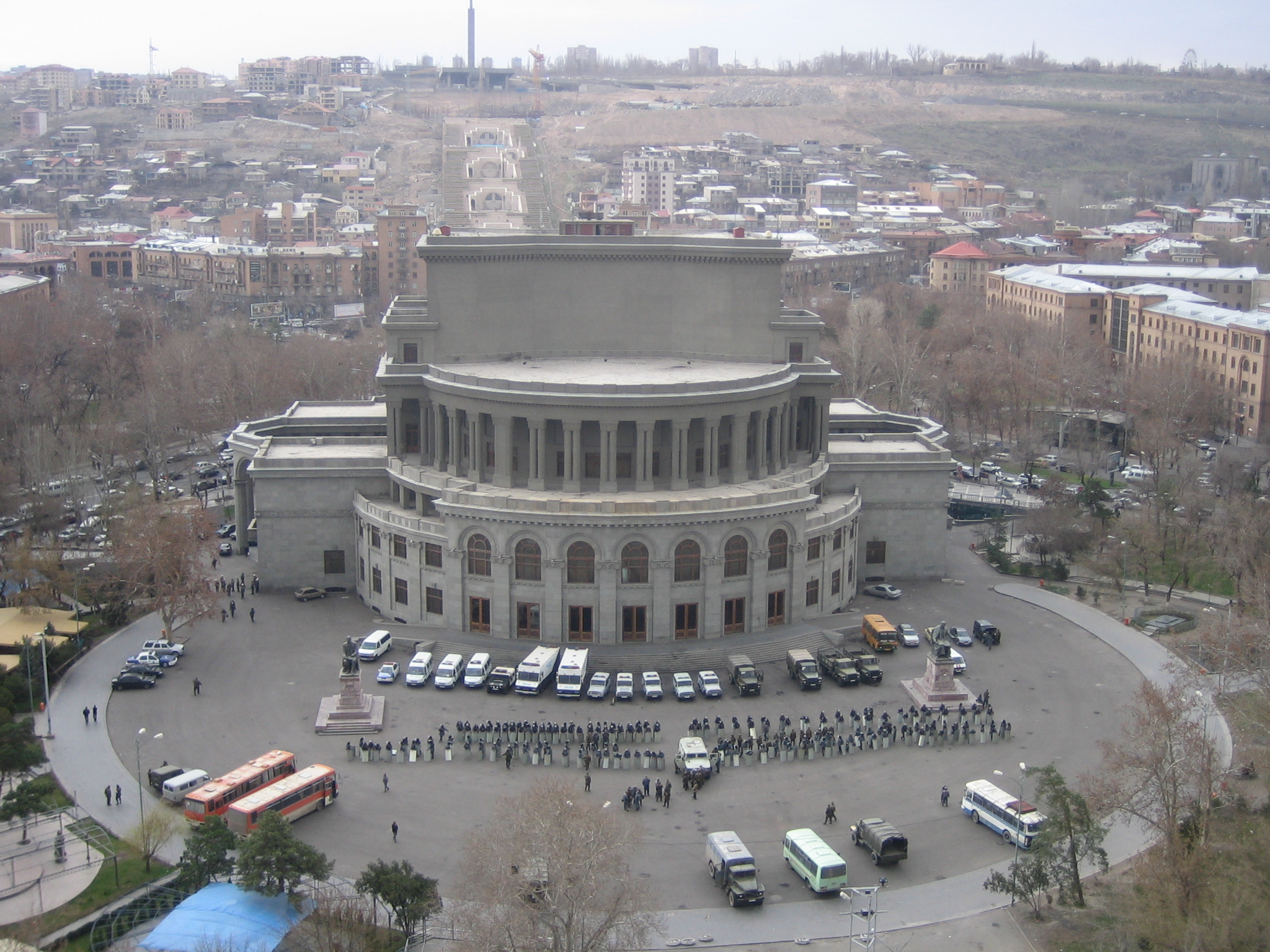
Since 2 March, riot police and army occupy and block access to Freedom Square as well as to other major squares in Yerevan

The Armenian police arrested 30 protestors accusing them of starting the riot.

The Armenian Medical Centre (the former Republican hospital) treated civilians which had concussions from the beating by the police in connection with arrest. A number of them claimed to have been persons only passing by the demonstration. One patient had been hit by a bullet which had perforated his jaw and he could not speak. Another civilian could not be visited as he was in severe condition and held in reanimation.

Several civilians who had sought medical assistance following the riots of 1 March had been denied assistance or turned down by the some hospitals. Also, it happened that patients released from the hospitals had been immediately arrested.

At least 106 members of the opposition have been arrested, and Levon Ter-Petrosyan has been under de facto house arrest since 1 March.

=== Arrests ===
According to article 130 of the Criminal Procedures Code, a person can be held for twenty-four hours without charges. Over 400 persons have been apprehended and asked to give testimony of the events on 1 March.

On 13 March the Prosecutor General informed that over 95 persons had been arrested for having organized or participated in demonstrations and mass disturbances of public order. Information provided by non-governmental sources on 15 March stated that an additional 50 persons had been arrested, mostly outside of Yerevan in major cities of Armenia like Gyumri.

=== Police brutality ===
According to the Council of Europe Commissioner of Human Rights, Thomas Hammarberg who visited a number of detainees in Nubarashen Prison, the Temporary holding facility of the National Security Service and the Holding Centre of Yerevan City Police Department, "the number of injured persons and detainees still after fourteen days showing marks of beating is clearly a matter of grave concern". The Commissioner has stated that allegations of police brutality should be investigated.

=== Fighting in Nagorno-Karabakh ===
Skirmishes between the Nagorno-Karabakh Defense Army and the Military of Azerbaijan were reported along the contact line near the Mardakert. These skirmishes were the worst fighting along the contact line since the ceasefire after the First Nagorno-Karabakh War in 1994 and have caused several fatalities. The Armenian side blames Azerbaijan for trying to take advantage of unrest in Armenia. The Azeri side blames Armenia claiming that they are trying to divert attention from problems at home but Azerbaijan's President Ilham Aliyev has also said his country is ready to re-take the region by force, and has been buying the military hardware and ammunition to do so.

== Constitutional Court decision ==
On 9 March 2008, the Constitutional Court officially rejected the opposition's claim that the election was rigged.

== In culture ==
Documentary films

- The Lost Spring of Armenia (Հայաստանի կորսված գարունը) by Tigran Paskevichyan (2011)

Films

- Maestro by Vigen Chaldranyan (2009)

Plays

- Love and Hatred (Սեր և ատելություն) by Vardan Petrosyan (2008)

== See also ==
- Human Rights in Armenia
- April 2017 Armenian street protests
- 2018 Armenian revolution
