= Free Homeland Alliance =

Free Homeland Alliance Ազատ հայրենիք դաշինք
- Leader: Mikael Hayrapetyan, Andreas Ghukasyan, Paruyr Hayrikyan
- Founded: May 2021
- Headquarters: Yerevan
- Ideology: Pro-Western; Pro-Europeanism; Anti-Russian
- Political position: Big tent
- Member parties: Union for National Self-Determination; Armenian Constructive Party; Conservative Party; Green Party; National Democrats Union
- Slogan: "Honesty, Wisdom, Will"
- National Assembly: 0 / 107

Website
- Facebook page

The Free Homeland Alliance (Armenian: Ազատ հայրենիք դաշինք, romanized: Azat hayrenik’ dashink’) is a political alliance between five political parties in Armenia.

== History ==
The alliance was founded in May 2021 and subsequently announced its intention to participate in the 2021 Armenian parliamentary elections. Mikael Hayrapetyan was nominated to lead the alliance, while Andreas Ghukasyan was the bloc's candidate for prime minister. Following the election, the alliance won just 0.32% of the popular vote, failing to gain any representation in the National Assembly. The alliance disputed the results of the election and claimed that the election was non-democratic. The alliance currently acts as an extra-parliamentary force.

== Members ==
Members of the alliance include:

- Union for National Self-Determination
- Armenian Constructive Party
- Conservative Party
- Green Party
- National Democrats Union

== Ideology ==
The alliance was opposed to any political cooperation with Nikol Pashinyan or Robert Kocharyan. The alliance proposed to shift Armenia's geopolitical alignment towards Europe and the West and called for Armenia to enter a political and military alliance with France. The alliance believes that Armenian laws and legislation should be synced with European standards. During an interview on 15 June 2021, Andrias Ghukasyan stated that Russia is no longer an ally of Armenia and that Armenia should develop closer relations with the European Union and the United States.

In addition, the alliance supports the recognition of Artsakh's independence and also supports sustainable economic development, reducing taxes, improving the educational system, and strengthening Armenia's democracy and security.

== Electoral record ==
Election	Votes	%	Seats	+/–	Position	Government
2021	4,119	0.32	0 / 107	0	▲16th	Extra-parliamentary

== See also ==
- Programs of political parties in Armenia
