= Andrias Ghukasyan =

Armenian politician, political analyst

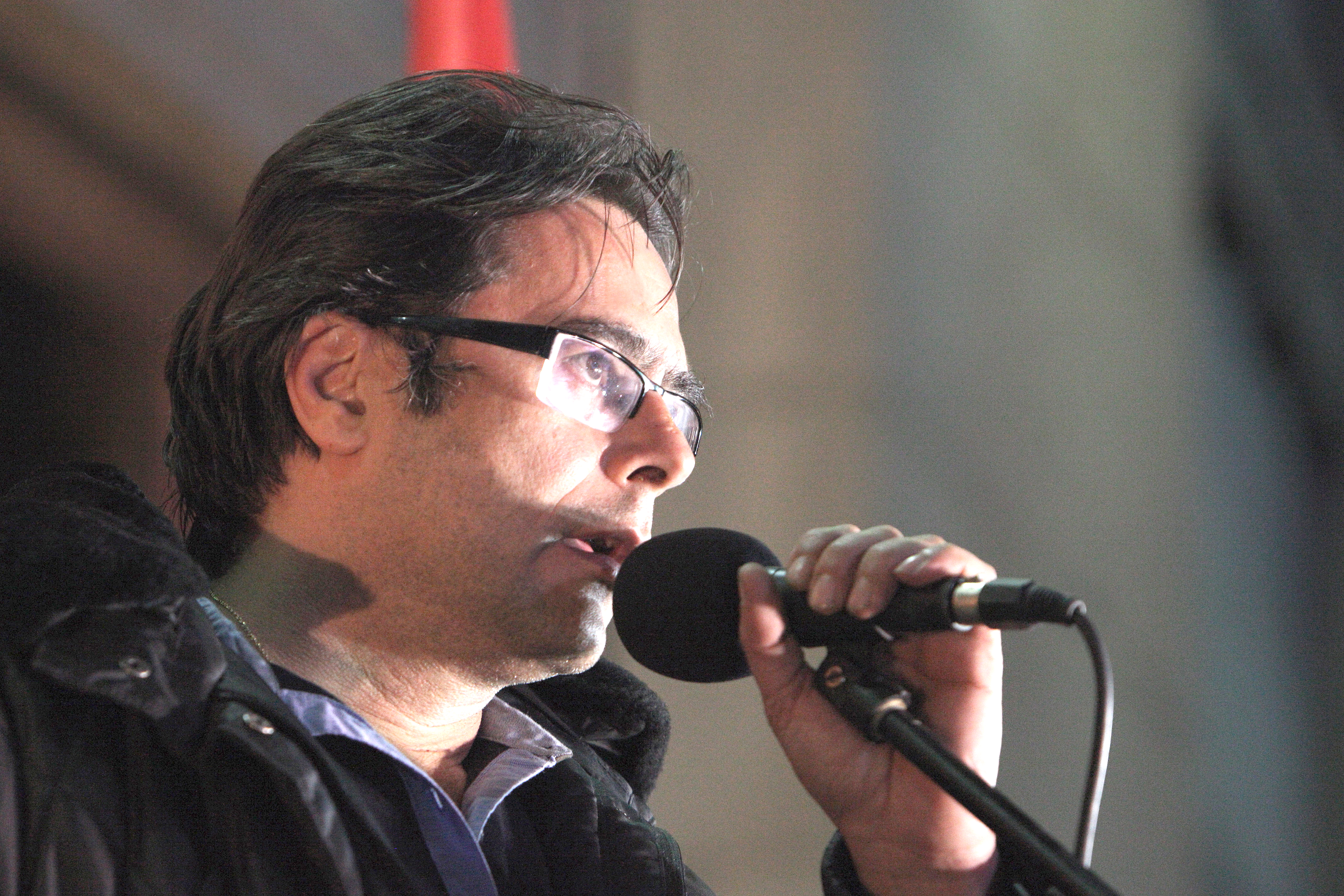
Armenian political analyst Andrias Ghukasyan

Andrias Marati Ghukasyan (Armenian: Անդրիաս Մարատի Ղուկասյան) is an Armenian political analyst.

Ghukasyan was one of seven candidates in the 2013 presidential election.

== Early life ==
In 1987, he finished secondary school at N83. In the same year he entered the Yerevan State University Department of Economics. From 1988 to 1989, he served in the Soviet Army. In 1994, he graduated from Yerevan State University having an "Economic Cybernetics" specialty and received a degree in economics-mathematics. In 2005, he graduated from the St. Petersburg International Economic Relations, Economics and Law Institute, earning his bachelor's degree in Jurisprudence.

== Politics ==
=== Hunger strike ===
On January 21, 2013, Ghukasyan started a hunger strike in front of the Armenian National Academy of Sciences building in Yerevan. He had a large poster, written in Armenian and English demanding to "Stop fake elections". Finishing his protest after the results were announced, Ghukasyan, together with another opposition candidate, Raffi Hovhannisian, a US-born Armenian politician who is the founder of the Heritage Party, filed an appeal with the Armenian Constitutional Court to dispute the results of the election (which gave incumbent Serzh Sargsyan a second term).

=== Rise up, Armenia ===
On July 16, 2015 he co-founded the Rise up, Armenia movement. It opposes raising electricity tariffs and organizes rallies against raising electricity tariffs generally in Republic Square.

On August 21, 2015 he with other Rise up, Armenia members was apprehended during a rally, freed after several hours.

He was arrested in July 2016, during the 2016 Yerevan hostage crisis.

=== Armenian Constructive Party ===
In July 2018, Andrias Ghukasyan established the Armenian Constructive Party.

In May 2021, the Armenian Constructive Party joined the Free Homeland Alliance to participate in early parliamentary elections.
