= Union of Producers and Women =

Union of Producers and Women Արտադրողների և կանանց միություն
- Abbreviation: AKM
- Leader: Seda Petrosyan
- Founded: 2003
- Headquarters: Yerevan

The Union of Producers and Women (Armenian: Արտադրողների և կանանց միություն, Artunaperoghneri yev Kanants Miyutyun; acronym AKM) was an electoral alliance in Armenia. The alliance was formed by two political groups, the Women of the Armenian Land and the Progressive United Communist Party of Armenia, as well as two NGOs, the "Domestic Producers" and "Yerevan and Its Inhabitants".

== History ==
Following the 2003 Armenian parliamentary election, the coalition won 24,388 votes (2.04%) but failed to gain any seats within the National Assembly. The coalition nominated 15 candidates for election.

The front figure of the coalition was Seda Petrosyan.

The party has not participated in any subsequent elections.

== See also ==
- Programs of political parties in Armenia
- Politics of Armenia
