= Conservative Party (Armenia) =

Conservative Party of Armenia Հայաստանի պահպանողական կուսակցություն
- Leader: Hayk Mirzoyan
- Founded: 1991
- Headquarters: Yerevan
- Ideology: Neoconservatism; Social conservatism; Pro-Europeanism; Anti-Russian sentiment
- Political position: Right-wing
- National affiliation: Free Homeland Alliance (2021)

Website
- conservative.am/

The Conservative Party (Armenian: Հայաստանի պահպանողական կուսակցություն, romanized: Hayastani pahpanoghakan kusakts’ut’yun) is a political party in Armenia. It was founded in 1991.

== History ==
The Conservative Party was founded in 1991. The current charter of the party was adopted during the 5th party congress on 1 November 2003. The Conservative Party had been a member of the Armenian National Congress (ANC), and some members participated in the 2012 Armenian parliamentary elections under the ANC's electoral list. The party opted to leave the ANC in 2013. Several party members participated in the 2013 Yerevan City Council election, under the Heritage party's Barev Yerevan alliance. The alliance came in third place, winning 8.48% of the vote.

The Conservative Party confirmed that it would participate in the 2021 Armenian parliamentary elections as part of the Free Homeland Alliance. Following the election, the Free Homeland Alliance received just 0.32% of the popular vote, failing to win any seats in the National Assembly.

The Conservative Party currently does not have any representation in the National Assembly and acts as an extra-parliamentary force.

On 18 July 2022, Mikael Hayrapetyan resigned from the position of chairman of the Conservative Party. Hayrapetyan had been serving as chairman since 1998.

On 9 January 2024, Hayk Mirzoyan was elected as party chairman.

== Ideology ==
Alternative logo of the party.

The party supports strengthening Armenia's state security, protection of the Armenian language, culture and Christian traditions, civil rights, freedom of conscience and property rights. Furthermore, the party believes in developing a strong democracy, civil society and European legal model, good neighborly relations, and a highly developed educational system and economy. The party proclaims that state intervention in daily activities of its citizens should be minimal.

The party opposes the concept of Eurasianism. The party also seeks to counter Russian influence in Armenia and opposes any Russian military bases in Armenia or Artsakh. The party has stated that Russian influence has kept Armenia from developing closer ties with the European Union and the United States. Following the 2020 Nagorno-Karabakh war, the party accused Russia and Turkey of collaborating against Armenia. The party also called for Armenian Prime Minister Nikol Pashinyan to resign.

During the 2020–2021 Armenian protests, the party accused Russia and Turkey for trying to destabilize Armenia and called for Armenia to develop a stronger strategic partnership with the United States.

== Activities ==
On 12 November 2013, the party stated that Armenia is being coerced to join a Customs Union with Russia, during an interview.

On 22 December 2020, the Conservative Party, the Democratic Homeland Party and the Union for National Self-Determination held a joint meeting discussing the political situation in Armenia.

On 26 February 2021, the party released a statement along with the Armenian Constructive Party and the Democratic Homeland Party, condemning the signing of the 2020 Nagorno-Karabakh ceasefire agreement. The three parties called for an end to Russian-Turkish interference in Armenia and Artsakh.

On 15 April 2021, the party signed a joint declaration with eight other political parties calling on the President of Armenia to ensure democracy and the Constitution of Armenia is upheld in the country during the 2020–2021 Armenian protests.

On 3 August 2021, the Conservative Party, the European Party of Armenia and the Sovereign Armenia Party released a joint statement calling for the Armenian government to demand the CSTO military alliance to cease selling weapons to Azerbaijan and Turkey. The statement also called for the withdrawal of Armenia from the CSTO, should the alliance ignore Armenia's security concerns.

== See also ==
- List of conservative parties by country
- Programs of political parties in Armenia
