= Justice (Armenia) =

Electoral coalition in Armenia

- Founded: 2003
- Dissolved: c. 2007
- Headquarters: Yerevan
- Ideology: Big tent
- Political position: Catch-all; Left-wing to right-wing
- Member parties: Democratic Party of Armenia; Hanrapetutyun Party; Social Democrat Hunchakian Party; National Democratic Union; People's Party of Armenia; Constitutional Rights Union; National Democrats Union

The Justice Party (Armenian: Արդարություն, Ardarutyun), also known as the Justice Alliance, was an electoral coalition, consisting of nine different political parties in Armenia.

== History ==
The electoral alliance was created by Stepan Demirchyan, leader of the People's Party of Armenia in 2003.

Prior to the 2003 Armenian parliamentary election, the Justice coalition listed 136 candidates to run in the election across Armenia. Some candidates from other minor parties were also included in the list, to which they were affiliated with the coalition, but not formally part of it. Following the 2003 election, the Justice coalition won 13.6% of the popular vote and 14 out of 131 seats. It became the second largest group within the National Assembly and had won the second largest percentage of the popular vote.

The People's Party of Armenia often regarded itself as the lead party within the coalition, however, other member parties disputed this.

The coalition dissolved prior to the 2007 Armenian parliamentary elections due to internal divisions among members. Some of the members chose to run independently in the 2007 elections.

== Ideology ==
Since the coalition consisted of several political parties, each party supported various ideologies. During an interview, Stepan Demirchyan stated, "We should strive for good neighborly relations with our neighbors, we are in favor of European integration, we attach importance to relations with Russia and the United States. I do not see any contradiction here. Armenia must pursue a balanced foreign policy."

== See also ==
- Politics of Armenia
- Programs of political parties in Armenia
