= All Armenian Labour Party =

- Founded: 1990s or 2000s
- Headquarters: Yerevan
- Ideology: Social democracy
- Political position: Centre-left
- National affiliation: Armenian Revolutionary Federation

The All Armenian Labour Party (Armenian: Համահայկական աշխատավորական կուսակցություն), also known as the Pan-Armenian Workers' Party, is a social democratic political party in Armenia.

== History ==
Prior to the 2003 Armenian parliamentary elections, the party announced its support and helped finance the Armenian Revolutionary Federation's campaign. Following the election, the party won two seats in the National Assembly as part of the Armenian Revolutionary Federation's constituency list.

Prior to the 2007 Armenian parliamentary election, one member of the party became a deputy in the National Assembly under the Republican Party of Armenia's electoral list. The party has not participated in any subsequent Armenian parliamentary elections since 2007.

== See also ==
- Programs of political parties in Armenia
- Politics of Armenia
