= Armenian Constructive Party =

Armenian Constructive Party Հայկական կառուցողական կուսակցություն
- Leader: Andrias Ghukasyan
- Founded: July 2018; 7 years ago
- Headquarters: Yerevan, Armenia
- Ideology: Liberalism
- Political position: Centre
- National affiliation: Free Homeland Alliance (2021)

The Armenian Constructive Party, sometimes known as the Armenian Construction Party (Armenian: Հայկական կառուցողական կուսակցություն, romanized: Haykakan karruts’voghakan kusakts’ut’yun) is a liberal political party in Armenia. The party was established in July 2018 and is currently led by Andrias Ghukasyan.

== History ==
The party was established prior to the 2018 Armenian parliamentary election, with the intent to participate and support the goals of the 2018 Armenian revolution. However, the party ultimately did not participate and does not have representation within the National Assembly. The party currently acts as an extra-parliamentary force.

During the 2020–2021 Armenian protests, Andrias Ghukasyan called on Prime Minister Nikol Pashinyan to resign and for Armenia to recognize the independence of Artsakh.

The Armenian Constructive Party confirmed that it would participate in the 2021 Armenian parliamentary elections as part of the Free Homeland Alliance. Following the election, the Free Homeland Alliance received just 0.32% of the popular vote, failing to win any seats in the National Assembly.

== Ideology ==
Alternate logo of the party.

The party advocates for fighting corruption, upholding free and fair elections, lowering taxes, criminal justice reform, and establishing a legitimate democracy in Armenia. The party had accused both the My Step Alliance and the parties of the Homeland Salvation Movement of being unable to govern the country. Andrias Ghukasyan has also warned of increasing Russian influence over Armenian politicians. Following the 2020 Nagorno-Karabakh war, Ghukasyan accused Russia of intentionally dividing up Armenian lands.

== Activities ==
On 19 February 2019, the party held a joint conference with the National Progress Party of Armenia. The leaders of both parties called for constitutional reform in Armenia.

In November 2020, Andrias Ghukasyan along with the leaders of the Democratic Party of Armenia and the Citizen's Decision Party met with President Armen Sargsyan to discuss the political situation in Armenia and the Nagorno-Karabakh conflict.

On 26 February 2021, the party released a statement along with the Democratic Homeland Party and the Conservative Party, condemning the signing of the 2020 Nagorno-Karabakh ceasefire agreement. The three parties called for an end to Russian-Turkish interference in Armenia and Artsakh.

On 15 April 2021, the party signed a joint declaration with eight other political parties calling on the president of Armenia to ensure democracy and the Constitution of Armenia is upheld in the country, during the 2020–2021 Armenian protests.

== Electoral record ==
=== Parliamentary elections ===
| Election | Leader | Votes | % | Seats | +/– | Position | Government |
|---|---|---|---|---|---|---|---|
| 2021 (Note: As part of Free Homeland Alliance.) | Andrias Ghukasyan | 4,119 | 0.32 | 0 / 107 | 0 | ▲16th | Extra-parliamentary |

== See also ==
- Programs of political parties in Armenia
