= Karen Demirchyan =

Soviet Armenian politician (1932–1999)

National Hero of Armenia Karen Demirchyan
- Կարեն Դեմիրճյան
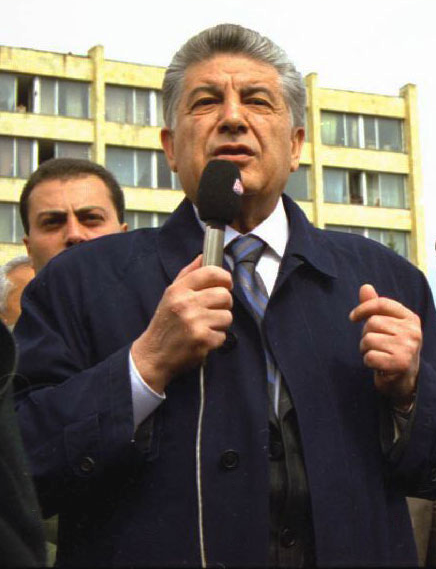
- Demirchyan in 1999

President of the National Assembly
- In office 11 June 1999 – 27 October 1999
- President: Robert Kocharyan
- Preceded by: Khosrov Harutyunyan
- Succeeded by: Armen Khachatryan

First Secretary of the Armenian Communist Party
- In office 27 November 1974 – 21 May 1988
- Preceded by: Anton Kochinyan
- Succeeded by: Suren Harutyunyan

Full member of the 25th Central Committee of the Communist Party of the Soviet Union
- In office 5 March 1976 – 1988

Personal details
- Born: Karen Serobi Demirchyan; 17 April 1932 Yerevan, Transcaucasian SFSR, Soviet Union
- Died: 27 October 1999 (aged 67) Yerevan, Armenia
- Cause of death: Assassination
- Resting place: Komitas Pantheon, Yerevan
- Party: CPSU / Communist Party of Armenia (1954–1991); People's Party (1998–99)
- Children: Stepan Demirchyan
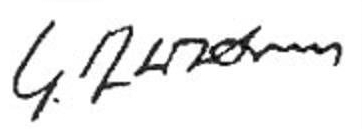
- Signature

Karen Serobi Demirchyan (Armenian: Կարեն Սերոբի Դեմիրճյան; 17 April 1932 – 27 October 1999) was a Soviet and Armenian politician who served as President of the National Assembly in 1999 until he was killed in the Armenian parliament shooting. He had been also the First Secretary of the Communist Party of Armenia from 1974 to 1988.

== Early life and career ==
Demirchyan had a difficult childhood. Both his parents died when he was still an infant. He decided on a career in engineering, and took up studies at the Yerevan Polytechnical Institute in 1949. After graduating in 1954 he worked briefly for a research institute in Leningrad before returning to Armenia to join the Yerevan Electrotechnical Factory. A member of the Communist Party since 1954, he soon became secretary of the factory party committee.

His party career flourished and in 1959 Demirchyan was sent to Moscow to the Higher Party School, gaining his diploma in 1961, a prerequisite for higher party service. He returned to work as chief engineer of the Yerevan Electrotechnical Factory and later director. In 1966 he became third secretary of the Yerevan party committee, joining the secretariat of the Armenian Central Committee in 1972.

== Leadership of Soviet Armenia ==
Demirchyan was elected first secretary of the Armenian Communist Party in November 1974, effectively the leader of Soviet Armenia. Two years later he also became chairman of the Armenian Supreme Soviet. During his fourteen-year rule, Armenia was prosperous by Soviet standards, its economy helped by semi-legal and illegal businesses. During Demirchyan's leadership, the Metsamor Nuclear Power Plant, Yerevan Metro, the Sports and Concert Complex and other buildings were put into operation in the republic. On April 23, 1975, Demirchyan, on behalf of the republic, condemned the organizers of the Armenian Genocide. Through his efforts, the article establishing Armenian as the state language was reaffirmed in the new 1978 Constitution of the Armenian SSR.

Despite all of this, Demirchyan failed to quell popular demonstrations in Armenia calling for Nagorno-Karabakh to be transferred to Armenian jurisdiction, even siding with the protesters. He lost the support of the Moscow Kremlin leadership and was removed "on health grounds" in May 1988.

== Post-independence politics ==
After the collapse of the Soviet Union in 1991 when Armenia regained its independence, Demirchyan became director of the Hayelectromekena electrical equipment plant, the biggest plant in Armenia. He kept out of politics and was a half-forgotten figure from the past, until his surprise reemergence into politics in 1998.

Although not a member of any political party, he contested the 1998 presidential elections, managing to garner 30 per cent of the votes in the first round and 40 per cent in the second-round run-off against the eventual winner, Robert Kocharyan. He later formed the People's Party, teaming up with defense minister Vazgen Sargsyan to form the Miasnutyun (Unity) alliance to contest the 1999 parliamentary elections.

== Death ==
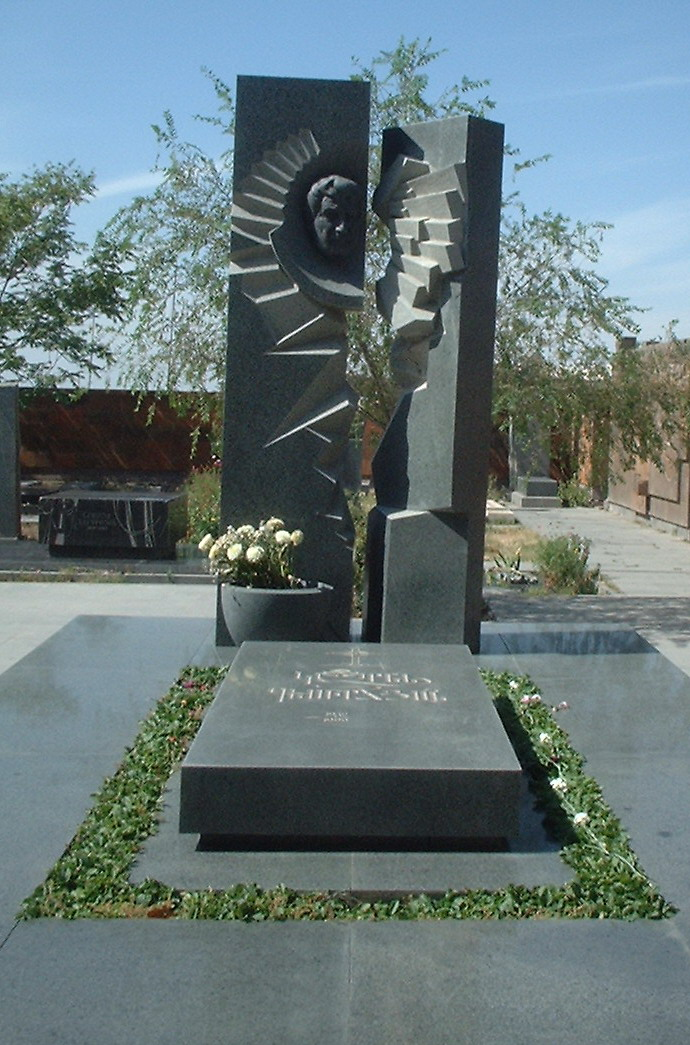
Demirchyan's tomb in Komitas Pantheon, Yerevan

The alliance won with 43 per cent of the vote and the majority of parliamentary seats. Demirchyan was overwhelmingly elected President of the National Assembly in June 1999. Four months later, on 27 October, he, along with Prime Minister Vazgen Sargsyan and 6 other senior politicians were shot and killed in the Armenian parliament shooting at Yerevan.

He was buried at Komitas Pantheon which is located in the city center of Yerevan.

== Personal life ==
Demirchyan was married with two sons, one of whom, Stepan Demirchyan, became a politician in Armenia after its independence in 1991.

== Legacy ==
A school, metro and a major concert complex are named after Karen Demirchyan in Yerevan. He was buried in a decorative tomb at the Komitas Pantheon, a cemetery in Yerevan where Armenia's most prominent artists and musicians have been buried. He posthumously received the honorary title National Hero of Armenia.

A sort of apple, which was planted in the north-western outskirts of Yerevan under his guidance, was named after Demirchyan.

== See also ==
- 1999 Armenian parliament shooting
