= Electric Yerevan =

2015 protests in Armenia

- Date: 20 June 2015 – 11 September 2015 (2 months, 3 weeks and 1 day)
- Location: Armenia: Yerevan, Gyumri, Vanadzor, Martuni, Spitak, and Ashtarak; Armenian diaspora: Los Angeles, New York, Paris, Brussels
- Goals: Reversal of the 17% price hike; Increased oversight of ENA
- Methods: Demonstrations, sit-ins, hunger strike, online activism, civil disobedience
- Result: ENA is sold to Tashir Group and price hike postponed

Parties
Civil opposition: No to robbery (Ոչ թալանին, Voch t'alanin); Rise up, Armenia (Ոտքի Հայաստան, Votki Hayastan)	(Armenia) Armenian government

Lead figures
Vaghinak Shushanyan (until August 8); Andreas Ghukasyan	Serzh Sargsyan

Electric Yerevan, also known within Armenia as No to Robbery (Armenian: Ոչ թալանին, Voch t'alanin) protests, were mass protests which occurred in the summer of 2015 against a 17% hike in electricity rates within Armenia. The protests were successful in reversing the price hike and causing the sale of Electric Networks of Armenia (ENA) from Inter RAO to the Tashir Group.

== Background ==
Electric Yerevan had been preceded by previous smaller movements against price hikes on marshrutkas public transportation and a new mandatory pension savings system. Then in June 2015, the Armenian Public Services Regulatory Committee (PSRC) increased the price of electricity for the public. The cost increased by 7 drams (US$0.01) per kilowatt hour, to be effective on August 1, 2015. This was the third price increase for electricity over the last few years, with most recently in 2013 having it risen by about a third. Garegin Bagramyan, the Armenian Public Services Regulatory Commission chairman also stated, "The main reason for this decision is the fluctuation in the currency exchange rates."

=== Armenian-Russian relations ===
During the post-Soviet era, relations between Armenia and Russia have been cooperative. Many post-Soviet states struggle with weak political party development, a high degree of fragmentation, and an anemic civil society. Post-Soviet countries lack genuine civic participation. Ideological restrictions and public sector dominance during the Soviet period enforced citizens to be passive and expect authorities to hold the responsibility for community welfare. In the post-soviet era, two new social classes have emerged. There is a new middle class with non-manual employees at its core and a lower class with chronic unemployment and economic inactivity at its core. 43% of the population lives below the poverty line, and the unemployment rate stands at 30%, stimulating the emigration of large numbers of the Armenian population, despite an 8% growth in gross domestic product. Armenia has a high level of dependency on foreign aid from the diaspora, contributing up to 20% of the GDP in 2006—to support both economic and human development within the country. In Armenia nominal democratic institutions do exist, but in reality an oligarchical system of political power has taken shape. This creates tension within the country that weakens the legitimacy of the government. Confrontation with the authorities often take a radical form, with mass meetings being quite frequent. According to the International Corruption Perception Index, Armenia is ranked 94th in public sector corruption. Faced with an imperative need to modernize, Armenia considered the EU’s enhanced offer under the Eastern Partnership with great interest. However, in the Fall of 2013, Armenia joined the Customs Union of Belarus, Kazakhstan and Russia. Armenia was also in negotiations with the European Union to allow the country to participate in a Deep and Comprehensive Free Trade Agreement. The European Union wanted close relations with former Soviet republics on Russia's borders. At the EU–Russia summit held in Khabarovsk in 2009, Russian President Dmitri Medvedev warned that Russia did not want the Eastern Partnership to turn into partnership against Russia. Due to being Russia's only ally in the region, Russia invests, trades and lends with Armenia. Russia also holds two military basis within Armenia and Armenia also joined the Collective Security Treaty Organization's Rapid Reaction Force to come to the defense of its members.

In 2015 the relations between the two countries turned sour, which stems from Armenia becoming outspoken about Russia due to its increased arm sales to Azerbaijan during the ongoing Nagorno-Karabakh conflict. Also despite joining Russia's Eurasian Economic Union in January 2015, Armenia's economy has stalled and declined. For example during the first half of 2015, Armenia’s exports to Russia declined by 35% compared with the same period in 2014. Financial transfers from Russia have declined sharply. In August 2015 private remittances from Russia to Armenia underwent a 49% decline by comparison with the same period in 2014, falling from $147.8 to $71.3 million - a trend continued into 2016. The reduction of remittance linked income to Armenia's population has negatively impacted the nations economy by resulting in a decline in retail trade. Russia's economic trouble is a result of international sanctions imposed because of Moscow's annexations of Crimea and involvement in Ukraine.

=== Post-Soviet era electricity privatization ===
Inter RAO is a parastatal company where the Russian government owns 52.68 percent of the company's shares. Inter RAO uses a parallel integrated grid which synchronizes the electric generators across the Caucasus and Central Asia. The connectivity of the grid provides coordination between the electric generators and allows shortfalls in one area to be made up with surpluses from another. While the grid increases the quality and reliability of electricity, it does raise security concerns to nations.

Electric Networks of Armenia (ENA) holds an exclusive license to distribute electricity in Armenia, doing so at tariffs approved by Armenia’s Public Services Regulatory Commission. ENA had been acquired by Russian Inter RAO UES in 2006. ENA justified the acquisition by stating the company had no other way of paying off over $250 million in debt caused by the inefficiencies in Armenia's outdated energy infrastructure.

An audit of the company’s 2013 finances showed losses of about $94 million, putting the company on the brink of bankruptcy. Concurrently, a 2013 World Bank report stated that the power sector in Armenia was under financed and that even raising tariffs would not cover increasing costs. On the other side, different media, international organizations and reports by RAO UES itself had mentioned corruption and mismanagement within ENA. In this regard, it has been pointed out that the latest hike could be afforded by the middle class but the underlying reasons for protest actually stemmed from a sense of mistrust in the government due to the perceived corruption and mismanagement.

== Protests ==
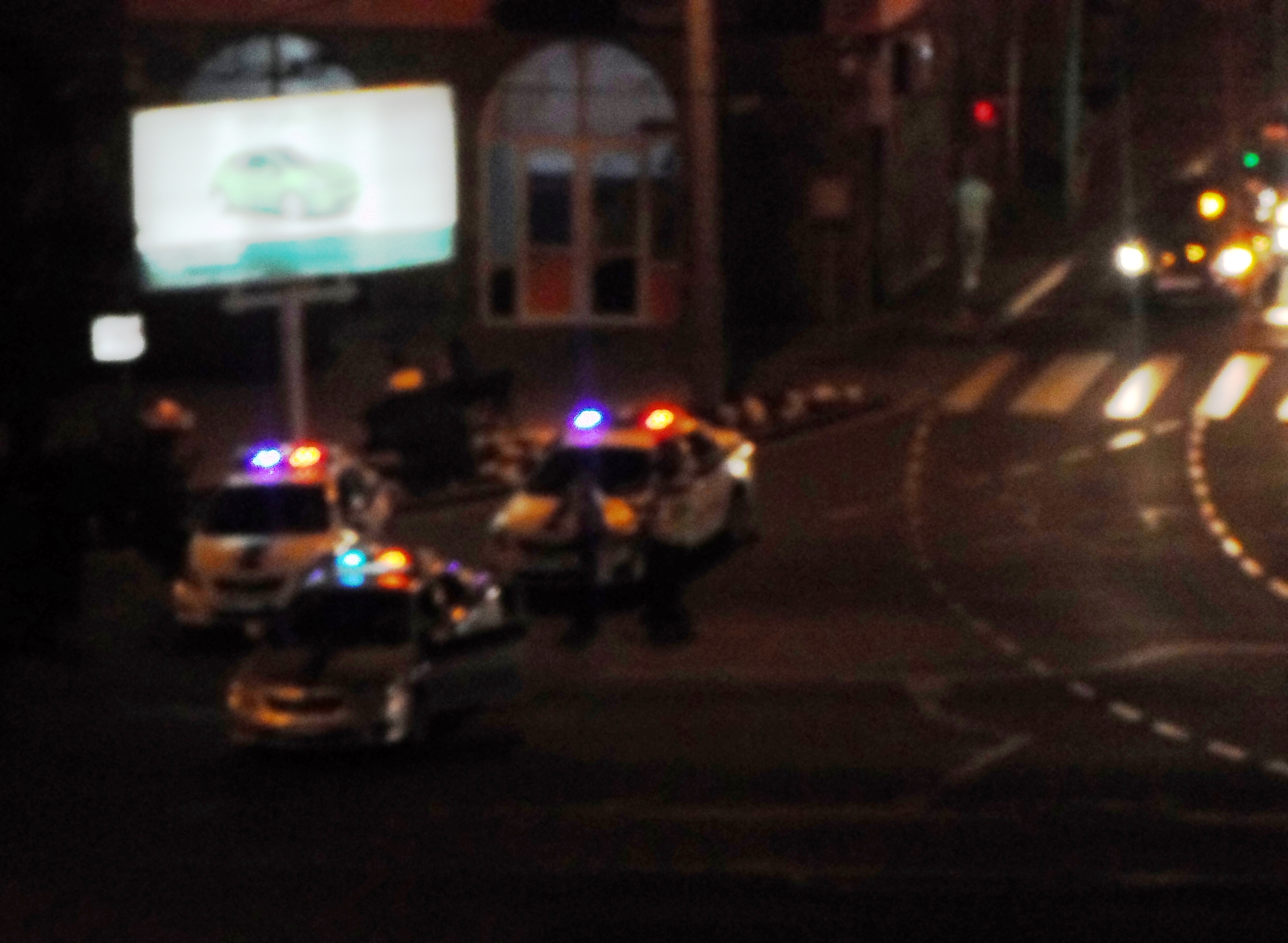
Police automobiles in Baghramyan Avenue

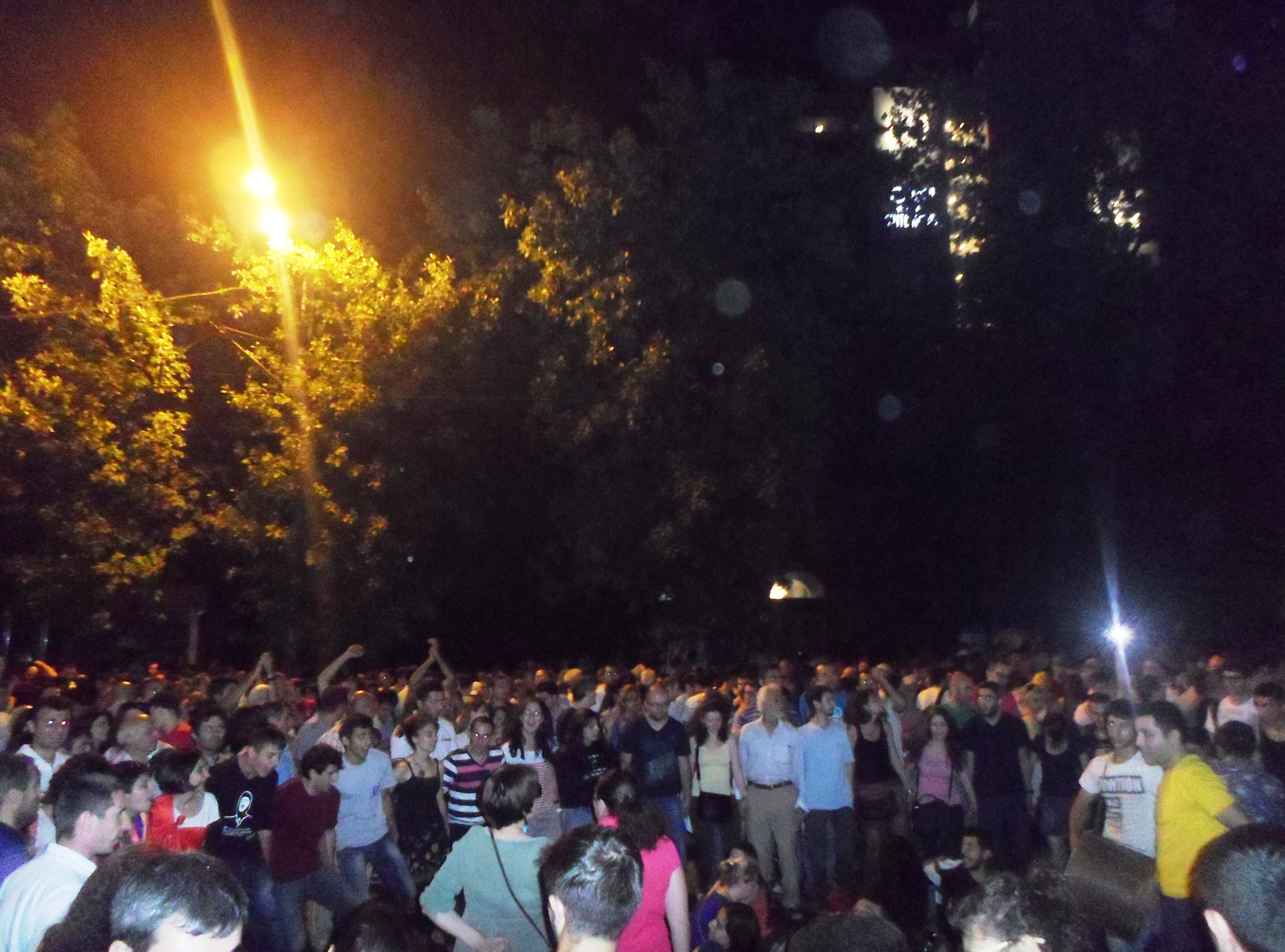
Sit-in in Baghramyan Avenue

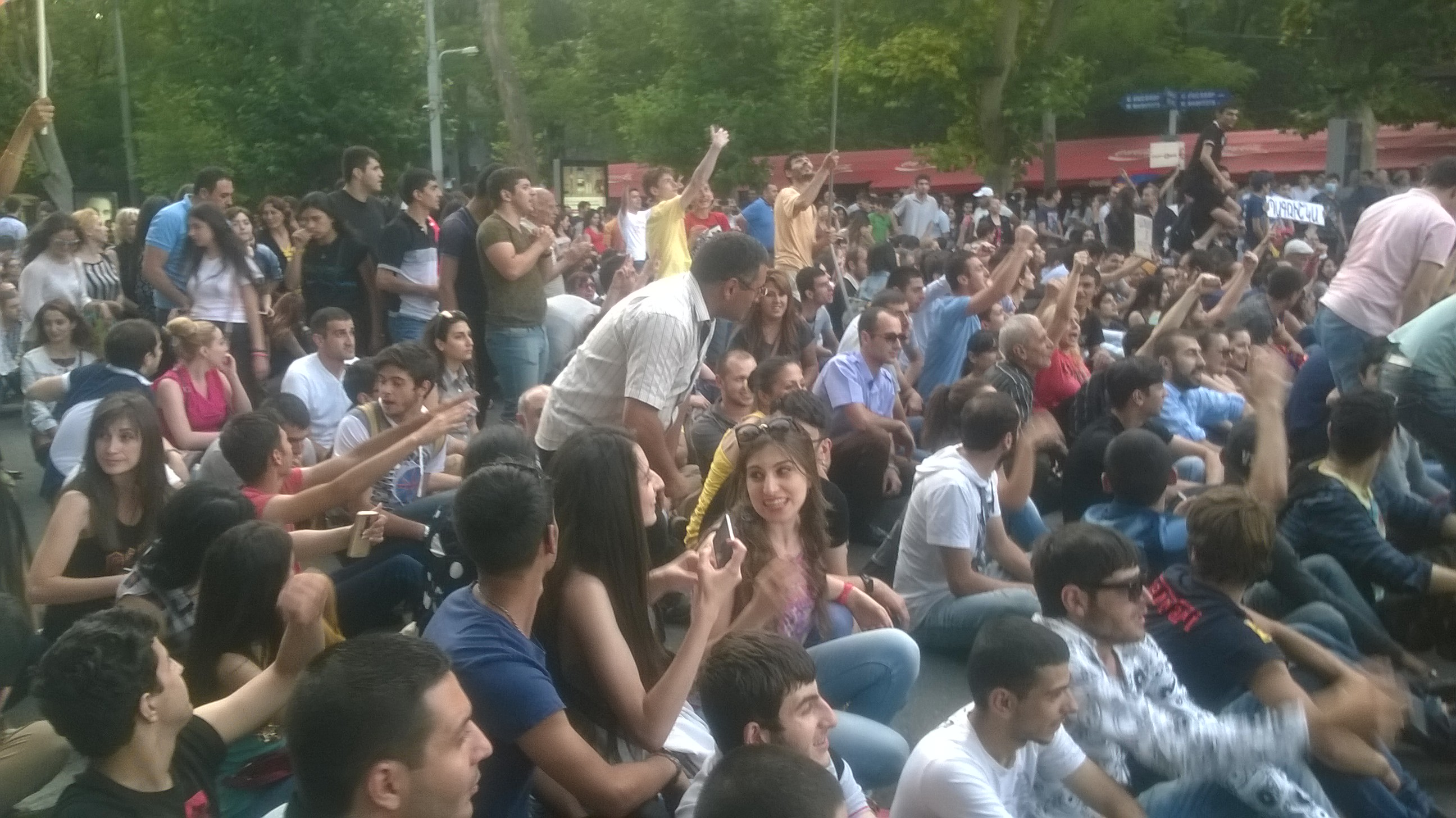
Sit-in in Mashtots Avenue

Protests began on June 19, 2015 and locally referred to as #ElectricYerevan, Revolution of socket, ElectroMaidan, EnergoMaidan. The latter two are a pun on Ukraine's Euromaidan in late 2013/early 2014. Protesters have stated that they do not wish to replicate Euromaidan and that they were angered by the suggestion in the Russian media that their protests are "a new Maidan". Lead figure Vaghinak Shushanyan credited the organization’s widespread support due to its specific demands — increased oversight of ENA, a reversal of the price hike and refusal to engage in political horse trading.

The apolitical nature of the protests allowed maximum engagement from ordinary citizens. Political party members participated as well, however without any organisational involvement from their respective parties.

The protestors age ranged from 17 to 35 and majority were part of Armenia's emerging middle class. Majority of protestors could afford the price hikes, however their actions were geared towards how the country is currently run.

On 20–21 June 2015, in the "high-voltage rally", activists went on a sit-in strike protesting against the price increase. At the end of the rally, a group of civil activists announced another sit-in in a central Yerevan square, which was attended by thousands of people.

On 22 June, the activists of the "high-voltage rally" marched to Baghramyan Avenue, towards the Presidential Palace and began a sit-in protest.

On 23 June, early in the morning 200 peaceful protesters were detained from the center of Baghramyan Avenue, many of whom were journalists. Police used water cannons on protesters which send 25 people to the hospital and triggered a larger wave of protests to follow. Protests spread to other Armenian cities like Gyumri, Vanadzor, Martuni, Spitak, and Ashtarak. Police brutality led to protestors blocking central Bagramyan Avenue and barricading themselves with dumpsters. On 27 June, protesters closed the Mashtots Avenue and Sayat-Nova Avenue intersection and the Place de France.

On 6 July, police disperses the sit-in which had returned to Freedom Square.

On 16 July, Andreas Ghukasyan and others created the "Rise up, Armenia" movement.

On 21 August, Rise up, Armenia members was apprehended during rally on Republic Square, but several hours after Rise up, Armenia all apprehended members freed.

On 1 September, "No to robbery" launches a rally in Lovers' Park. During the rally; protesters came down to Republic Square, where Rise up, Armenia's' organized sit-in participants, were.

On 4 September, Rise up, Armenia organized protest in Republic Square, with 40-day sit-in occasion. In protest also participated Pre-Parliament members.

== End of protests ==
An independent audit of ENA concluded that the electricity tariff increase was indeed due from a financial point of view. Eventually, the government approved the sale of ENA from RAO UES to the Tashir Group, run by Samvel Karapetyan, a Russia-based Armenian billionaire who had retained close links with Armenia as a philanthropist and is a generally respected figure in Armenia. The Armenian government then announced that they would jointly —together with the Tashir group— subsidize the hike until July 31, 2016.

Tashir Group acquired ENA for a total of $253 million. Tashir Group pledged to introduce international standards within five years, improve the management of the utility and is also committed to reduce the technological losses of the company by at least 2%. Tashir Group is planning to invest 8.4 billion dram to modernize the nations electricity metering system and another 5.8 billion to repair and construct distributions networks.

Tashir Group Vice President Karen Darbinyan said the investment program will target two aspects of the energy sector—distribution networks and energy production—adding that the most important part of the project will be the investment made for the construction of the "Shnogh" Hydroelectric power plan, with an approximate cost of $200 million. Darbinyan also announced that the projects that will result from the investment will create approximately 2,500 new jobs in Armenia.According to the Tashir Vice-President, since 2016 the company has been negotiations with several international financial organizations to implement the investment program. Specifically, Darbinyan said, the group has held talks with the Asian Development Bank and the European Bank for Reconstruction and Development. The director of the ENA, Karen Harutyunyan announced Monday that 30 percent of the investments to be made in the “Electric Networks of Armenia” over the next 10 years will be allocated toward equipment modernization, with approximately $12 million expected to be spent in 2018. Harutunyan said the upgrade will decrease electricity loss by 4 percent and cut the company’s expenditures by 50 percent.

== See also ==
- List of protests in the 21st century
