= 2003 Armenian parliamentary election =

- 25 May 2003
- All 131 seats in the National Assembly; 66 seats needed for a majority
Party	Leader	Vote %	Seats	+/–
Republican	Andranik Margaryan	23.37	33	
Justice	Stepan Demirchyan	13.60	14	
Orinats Yerkir	Artur Baghdasaryan	12.33	19	+13
ARF	Vahan Hovhannisyan	11.36	11	+3
National Unity	Artashes Geghamyan	8.79	9	New
United Labour	Gurgen Arsenyan	5.63	6	New
Hanrapetutyun	Aram Sargsyan	–	1	New
AALP		–	1	New
Independents	–	–	37	+5
This lists parties that won seats. See the complete results below.
Prime Minister before	Appointed Prime Minister
Andranik Margaryan; Republican	Andranik Margaryan; Republican

Parliamentary elections were held in Armenia on 25 May 2003. There were 56 constituency seats and 75 elected on a national basis using proportional representation. They saw the Republican Party of Armenia emerge as the largest party, with 33 of the 131 seats. However, the elections were strongly criticized by international election monitors, who cited widespread fraud and noted that they fell short of democratic standards.

== Results ==
Party	Proportional			Constituency			Total seats	+/–
Party	Votes	%	Seats	Votes	%	Seats	Total seats	+/–
Republican Party of Armenia	280,363	23.37	23	124,950	11.82	10	33	–
Justice Alliance	163,203	13.60	14			0	14	–
Orinats Yerkir	147,956	12.33	12	96,079	9.09	7	19	+13
Armenian Revolutionary Federation	136,270	11.36	11			0	11	+3
National Unity	105,480	8.79	9			0	9	New
United Labour Party	67,531	5.63	6			0	6	New
Liberal Democratic Union of Armenia	55,443	4.62	0			0	0	New
Mighty Fatherland	39,586	3.30	0			0	0	0
Armenian Democratic Liberal Party	34,108	2.84	0			0	0	0
Dignity, Democracy, Motherland	33,605	2.80	0			0	0	New
Armenian Communist Party	24,991	2.08	0			0	0	–10
Union of Producers and Women	24,388	2.03	0			0	0	New
People's Party of Armenia	13,214	1.10	0			0	0	–
Law and Unity	10,955	0.91	0			0	0	New
Liberals Alliance	9,711	0.81	0			0	0	New
Christian Democratic Union	8,057	0.67	0			0	0	New
Armenian National Movement	7,676	0.64	0			0	0	New
Justice Party	6,473	0.54	0			0	0	New
Renewed Communist Party of Armenia	6,200	0.52	0			0	0	New
National Accord	6,078	0.51	0			0	0	New
Fist of the Armenian Braves	3,438	0.29	0			0	0	New
Hanrapetutyun Party				15,298	1.45	1	1	New
All Armenian Labour Party				13,556	1.28	1	1	New
Independents				694,344	65.66	37	37	+5
None of the Above	14,921	1.24	–				–	–
Total	1,199,647	100.00	75			56	131	0
Valid votes	1,199,647	97.19		1,057,548	99.35			
Invalid/blank votes	34,622	2.81		6,926	0.65			
Total votes	1,234,269	100.00		1,064,474	100.00			
Registered voters/turnout	2,340,744	52.73						
Source: CEC, IPU, OSCE
