= Law and Unity =

- Founded: 2003
- Headquarters: Yerevan
- Ideology: Conservatism

Law and Unity (Armenian: Օրենք և միասնություն, romanized: Iravunk ev Miabanutiun) was a conservative political party in Armenia.

== History ==
Following the 2003 Armenian parliamentary election, the party won 1.0% of the popular vote but no seats in the National Assembly. The party has not participated in any subsequent elections and has since dissolved.

== See also ==
- Politics of Armenia
- Programs of political parties in Armenia
