= Artashes Geghamyan =

Armenian politician (1949–2024)

- Արտաշես Գեղամյան
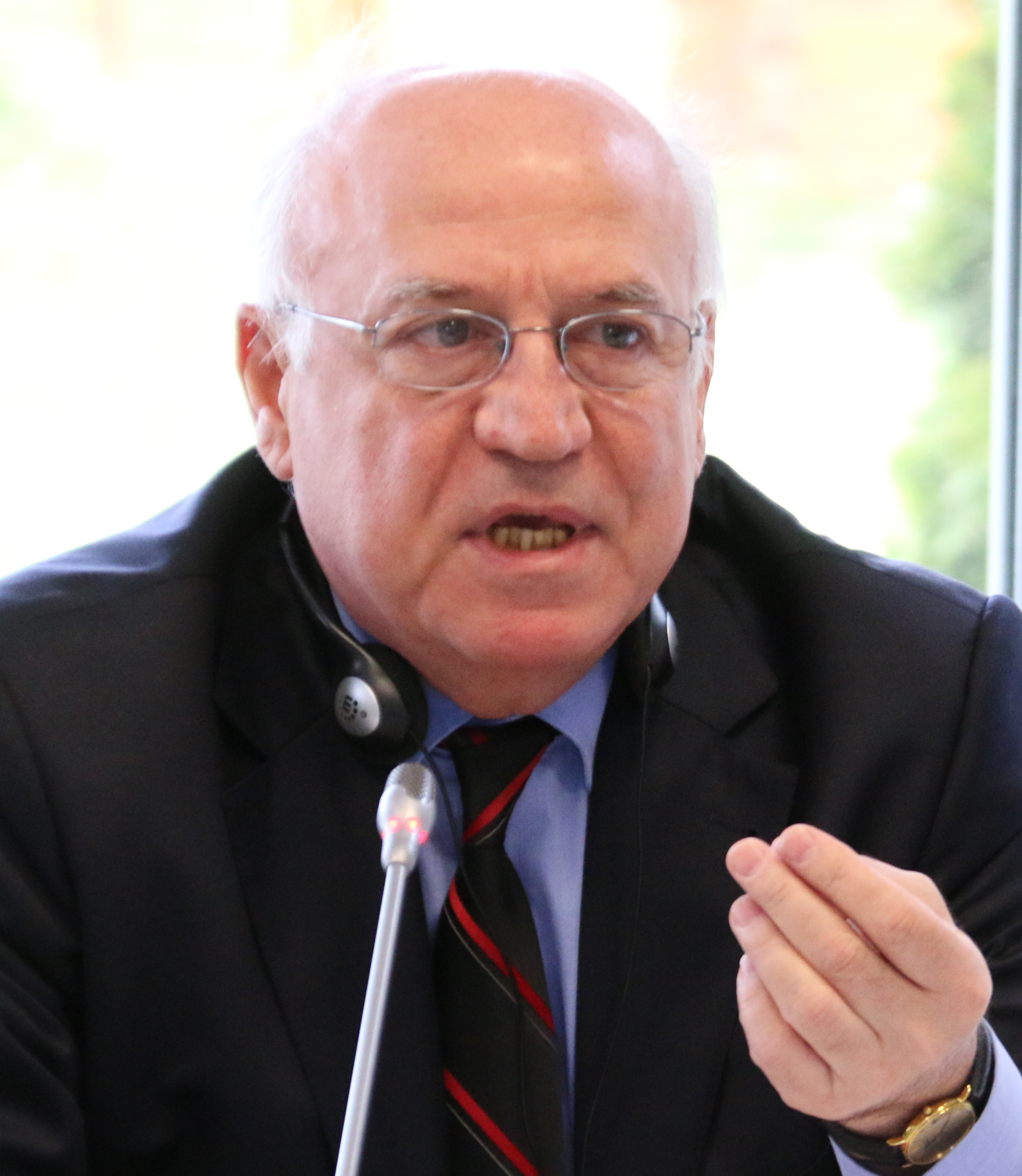
- Geghamyan in 2016

Leader of the National Unity Party
- In office April 1997 – 20 September 2024
- Succeeded by: TBD

Deputy of the National Assembly
- In office 1995–1999

Mayor of Yerevan
- In office 10 November 1989 – 2 October 1990
- Preceded by: Eduard Avakian
- Succeeded by: Hambardzum Galstyan

Personal details
- Born: 2 December 1949 Yerevan, Armenian SSR, USSR
- Died: 20 September 2024 (aged 74)
- Party: Armenian Communist Party (1972–1990) National Unity Party (1997–2024)
- Spouse: Married
- Children: 2
- Education: Yerevan Polytechnic Institute
- Occupation: Politician
- Profession: Armenian

Artashes Geghamyan (Armenian: Արտաշես Գեղամյան, pronounced [ɑɾtɑˈʃes ɡeʁɑˈmjɑn]; 2 December 1949 – 20 September 2024) was an Armenian politician.

== Biography ==
Geghamyan was born in Yerevan, Armenia. He finished Chekhov Secondary School in 1966 and graduated from the Yerevan Polytechnic Institute in 1971. He joined the Communist Party of the Soviet Union in 1972. From 1989 to 1990 he was the Mayor of Yerevan.

In 1990, he quit the Communist Party. From 1995 to 1999 he served as a deputy of the National Assembly. He was the leader of the National Unity Party which he founded in April 1997. In the 2003 presidential election, Geghamyan was a candidate, receiving 16.9% of the vote in the first round.

In the February 2008 presidential election, Geghamyan, running again as the National Unity Party's candidate, placed seventh with 0.27% of the vote.

== Personal life and death ==
He was married and had two sons and grandchildren.

Artaahes Geghamyan died on 20 September 2024, at the age of 74.

Preceded by Eduard Avakian	Mayor of Yerevan; 1989–1990	Succeeded by Hambardzum Galstyan
