= People's Party of Armenia =

Armenian political party

- Abbreviation: PPA
- Leader: Stepan Demirchyan
- Founded: 1998
- Headquarters: Yerevan
- Ideology: Socialism; Pro-Europeanism
- Political position: Centre-left to left-wing
- National Assembly: 0 / 107

The People's Party of Armenia (Armenian: Հայաստանի Ժողովրդական Կուսակցություն, Hayastani Zhoghovrdakan Kusaktsutyun) is a socialist political party in Armenia.

== History ==
The party nominated Karen Demirchyan as their presidential candidate in the 1998 Armenian presidential election. Demirchyan came in second place, winning 40.1% of the vote.

Prior to the 1999 Armenian parliamentary election, the People's Party of Armenia formed a political alliance with the Republican Party of Armenia, known as the "Unity Bloc". The alliance won 41.4% of the popular vote, winning 62 seats in the National Assembly.

The party decided to participate as part of the Justice coalition in the 2003 Armenian parliamentary election. After the election, the Justice coalition won 13.6% of the popular vote and 14 out of 131 seats. It became the second largest group within the National Assembly. Its presidential candidate, Stepan Demirchyan (son of Karen Demirchyan), won 28.03% of the popular vote in the first voting round of the 2003 Armenian presidential election, but lost the presidential election after the second voting round.

The party ran independently in the 2007 Armenian parliamentary elections and received 1.68% of the popular vote, however it did not win any seats.

Some party members participated in the 2012 Armenian parliamentary elections under the Armenian National Congress electoral list.

Before the 2017 Armenian parliamentary election, the party formed a political alliance with the Armenian National Congress. However, the alliance received just 3.72% of the vote and failed to gain any seats.

The party decided not to participate in the 2018 Armenian parliamentary election. Demirchyan congratulated winner Nikol Pashinyan following the elections.

== Ideology ==
Prior to the 2007 election, the party shifted its support from being Pro-Russian to Pro-European. Demirchian stated that, “Armenia has to take the road of European integration", effectively changing the parties preference from Russia and the CIS towards Europe and the West.

== See also ==
- Politics of Armenia
- Programs of political parties in Armenia
