= Artur Baghdasaryan =

Armenian politician

Artur Baghdasarian
- Արթուր Բաղդասարյան
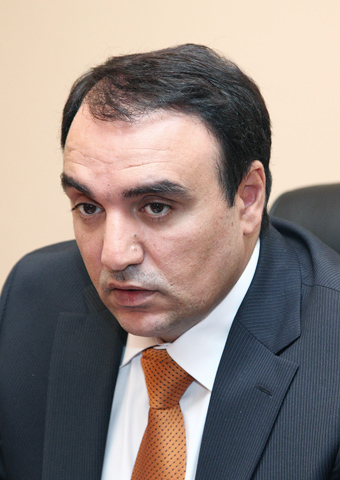
- Baghdasaryan in 2014

President of the National Assembly
- In office June 12, 2003 – June 1, 2006
- Preceded by: Armen Khachatryan
- Succeeded by: Tigran Torosyan

Personal details
- Born: November 8, 1969 (age 56) Yerevan, Armenian SSR, Soviet Union
- Party: Armenian Renaissance
- Education: Yerevan State University

Artur Baghdasaryan (Armenian: Արթուր Բաղդասարյան, born November 8, 1968) is an Armenian politician and former chairman of the National Assembly of Armenia and a former secretary of the National Security Council of Armenia. He is the leader of the Rule of Law party. He is married and has two children.

== Biography ==
Baghdasaryan was born in Yerevan. In 1985, he finished the Khachatur Abovian Secondary School in Yerevan. In the same year, he entered the Law Faculty of Yerevan State University and graduated in 1992. He served in the army from 1988 to 1989.

From 1989 to 1993, Artur Baghdasaryan worked as a journalist, serving as head of department and later as deputy editor-in-chief of the newspaper Avangard. In November 1993, he entered public service when he was elected deputy chairman of the Executive Committee of the Shengavit Community Council.

While advancing his career, Baghdasaryan pursued higher education, graduating with honors from the Academy of Civil Service in 1997. In 1995, he defended his Ph.D. thesis and earned the degree of Candidate of Legal Sciences. That same year, on July 5, he was elected as a deputy to the National Assembly of Armenia, representing Shengavit Electoral District 5. Shortly after, in September 1995, he was elected chairman of the Union of Lawyers and Political Scientists of Armenia.

In 1997, he further solidified his academic credentials by defending his doctoral dissertation in Moscow, earning a Doctor of Legal Sciences degree.

== Political career ==
- In March 1998, he was elected the Chairman of the Standing Committee on State and Legal Affairs of the National Assembly of Armenia.
- In June 1998, he was elected the Head of the Rule of Law Party. On 30 May 1999, he was elected Deputy of the National Assembly of Armenia of the 2nd Convocation from the Shengavit Electoral District Number 21, and in September 1999 was the Head of the "Orinats Yerkir" Faction of the National Assembly.
- In 2000, Baghdasaryan was chosen as the Chairman of the Board of the French University of Armenia, and in 2002 of the European Regional Academy in the Caucasus. From 2001 to 2003, he was a member of the Standing Commission on Foreign Relations of the National Assembly of Armenia.
- On 25 May 2003, he was elected a Deputy of the Third Convocation of the National Assembly of Armenia
- On 12 June 2003, Baghdasaryan was elected the President of the National Assembly of Armenia.

Although he was part of the governing coalition, in December 2005 Baghdasaryan alleged that "serious ballot stuffing" occurred during the November 2005 constitutional referendum. He stood as Rule of Law's candidate in the February 2008 presidential election and placed third with 17.7% of the vote according to final official results.

The Rule of Law Party and the second place candidate Levon Ter-Petrossian both criticized the 2008 election as being flawed, and the party claimed that Baghdasaryan received more votes that he was given in the final results. Baghdasaryan, unlike some other members of his party, did not take part in the protests against the election led by Ter-Petrossian, however. On February 29, 2008, he announced that he had accepted the post of Secretary of the National Security Council in a planned coalition government, recognizing the legitimacy of the election and the victory of Prime Minister Serzh Sargsyan. Although the post of Secretary of the National Security Council has previously been considered primarily ceremonial, and the Council seldom met, Sargysan said that he intended for the Council to become more active during his presidency, giving Baghdasaryan the opportunity "to get fully involved in the governance of our country."

He is the author of a number of scientific monographs and more than 100 scientific and analytical articles.

Baghdasaryan currently acts as the chairman of the Board of Trustees of the European University of Armenia.

Political offices
Preceded by Armen Khachatryan	President of the National Assembly of Armenia; 2003–2006	Succeeded by Tigran Torosyan
