= Stepan Demirchyan =

Armenian politician

- Ստեփան Դեմիրճյան
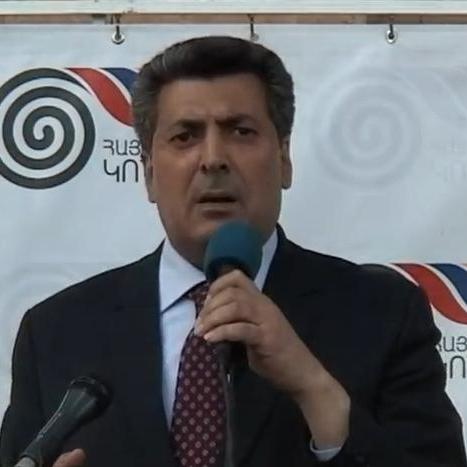
- Demirchyan in 2013

Leader of the People's Party of Armenia
- Incumbent
- Assumed office 1998
- Preceded by: Karen Demirchyan

Leader of the Justice Alliance in the National Assembly
- In office May 25, 2003 – 2007

Member of the National Assembly of Armenia
- In office May 25, 2003 – 2007
- Constituency: National Electoral List

Personal details
- Born: 7 June 1959 (age 67) Yerevan, Armenian SSR, Soviet Union
- Party: People's Party of Armenia
- Parent: Karen Demirchyan (father)
- Education: National Polytechnic University of Armenia

Stepan Kareni Demirchyan (Armenian: Ստեփան Կարենի Դեմիրճյան; born June 7, 1959) is an Armenian politician and son of the Communist-era Armenian leader Karen Demirchyan.

== Biography ==
Stepan Demirchyan was born in Yerevan and received his degree from Yerevan Polytechnic Institute in 1981. He is an engineer-electrician and a PhD on Technical Sciences. From 1981 to 1986 he worked first as a skilled worker and later senior skilled worker, supervisor-probationer, head of station and then deputy head of the assembly shop in the Electrical Engines Industrial Complex under the Ministry of Electrical Technologies Industry. From 1984 to 1986 he worked as an assistant engineer in the Electrical Engines Industrial Complex. From 1986 to 1988 he worked first as a chief engineer and later as acting director in the Construction Plant of Programming Equipment under the USSR Ministry of Equipment, Automation Means and Management Systems. The next fifteen years were spent as the general director of the Mars Industrial Complex.

He was a candidate in Armenia's 2003 presidential election.

On May 25, 2003, he was elected to the National Assembly from the proportional list of the Justice Alliance and is the leader of the Justice Fraction and the People's Party of Armenia.

== Personal life ==
Demirchyan is married and has three children.

== Sources ==
- http://www.parliament.am/deputies.php?sel=details&ID=55&lang=eng
