= Arevik (disambiguation) =

Arevik is a town in Armenia.

Arevik may also refer to:

- Arevik National Park, Armenia
- Arevik, Shirak, Armenia, a village and rural community
- Arev Petrosyan (born 1972), Armenian painter
- Arevik Petrosyan (born 1972), Armenian politician, lawyer and judge
- Arevik Tserunyan (born 1987), Armenian painter
