= 2026 Armenian parliamentary election =

- 7 June 2026
- All 101 seats in the National Assembly (plus additional and leveling seats)
- Turnout: 58.76% (▲9.39pp)
Party	Leader	Vote %	Seats	+/–
Civil Contract	Nikol Pashinyan	49.89	64	−7
Strong Armenia	Samvel Karapetyan	23.34	29	New
Armenia Alliance	Robert Kocharyan	9.95	12	−17
This lists parties that won seats. See the complete results below.
Results by Region
Prime Minister before	Prime Minister after
Nikol Pashinyan; Civil Contract	Nikol Pashinyan; Civil Contract

Parliamentary elections were held in Armenia on 7 June 2026 to elect members of the 9th convocation of the National Assembly. According to exit polls, incumbent Prime Minister Nikol Pashinyan's party Civil Contract won with 56.7% of the vote, followed by the pro-Russian Strong Armenia of Samvel Karapetyan with 17.5%.

According to Reuters, citing anonymous Western intelligence officials and documents, the election was subject to heavy Russian covert efforts to undermine Pashinyan and support pro-Russian candidates, including disinformation campaigns. The Armenian government was criticized by the International Observatory for Democracy in Armenia organization for actions viewed as causing democratic backsliding and political persecution of the opposition.

== Background ==
Since the previous election and with the Artsakh War, after the violent expulsion of the entire ethnic Armenian population from their homeland in Artsakh, the government had to make moves towards Azerbaijan on potential recognition of the loss of Artsakh. Following protests, the government criticized such actions. Parliamentary Speaker Simonyan also criticized protesters and praised Azerbaijan. The loss of Artsakh had also severely damaged the image of Russia amongst Armenians, as Russian peacekeepers were present in the region, yet did nothing to stop the Azeri takeover. Since the 2021 elections, Pashinyan's government has claimed that it has thwarted four separate coup attempts; the first in September 2023 by the Khachakirner militia, the second in November 2023 by a group with ties to the National Democratic Alliance, a direct Russian-backed coup in 2024 by the Arbat Battalion and Sev Hovaz, and mostly recently in 2025 by leaders of the Armenian Apostolic Church.

Various leaders of the Armenian Apostolic Church were arrested on charges of participation in the alleged 2025 attempted coup, with some sentenced to jail. Archbishop Mikael Ajapahyan was arrested in October 2025 and handed a two-year sentence in November. In February 2026, he was moved to house arrest. Armenian-Cypriot-Russian businessman Samvel Karapetyan was also arrested in 2025 and was placed under house arrest, which was extended in April 2026 by three months (running through the election). The Electric Networks of Armenia, part of his Tashir Group, were nationalized.

== Electoral system ==
The members of the unicameral National Assembly are elected by party-list proportional representation. The number of seats is at least 101, and rises when allocation of additional seats is required. Seats are allocated using the d'Hondt method with an election threshold of 4% for parties and 8% for two- and three-party alliances. However, a minimum of three political groups will enter parliament, regardless of the performance of the third-best performing party or alliance.

Candidates may participate in the elections only by being included in the nationwide list of a political party or an alliance of parties. For the elections, Armenia is divided into 13 electoral districts. A candidate for deputy must be at least 25 years old, have held only Armenian citizenship during the previous four years, have permanently resided in Armenia, possess voting rights, and be proficient in the Armenian language. According to the Constitution of Armenia, the National Assembly is elected for a five-year term and must consist of at least 101 deputies. The number of seats may be increased when the allocation of additional mandates is required.

Seats are allocated using the Hare quota and largest remainder method, proportionally among all political forces that surpass the electoral threshold (4% for parties and 8–10% for alliances of parties). If a party receives a majority of votes but wins less than 52% of the mandates, it will be allocated additional mandates to ensure 52% of the total seats. If one party wins more than two-thirds of the mandates, additional mandates will be granted to opposition parties that passed the threshold, reducing the winning party's share to two-thirds. If a government is not formed within six days after the publication of the preliminary results, a second round must be held on the 28th day between the two parties receiving the most votes. The party winning the second round will receive the additional mandates necessary to secure a 54% majority, while preserving all mandates allocated in the first round. Seats are allocated to parties using their national share of the vote. Four seats are reserved for national minorities (Assyrians, Kurds, Russians and Yazidis), with parties having separate lists for the four groups. A gender quota requires any top section of a party list to include at least 33% candidates of each gender.

== Parties and alliances ==
The deadline to register lists was 23 April 2026 at 18:00.

Nineteen political forces, well-known in political circles and newly emerged, have submitted applications to the Central Electoral Commission (CEC). The ruling Civil Contract Party, the largest opposition force in parliament, the Armenia Alliance, and Samvel Karapetyan's Strong Armenia have submitted candidacy applications for the elections. The third force in parliament, the Republican Party, has decided not to participate in the elections. Those who have indicated running are:

Name of party or alliance	Allied parties	First candidate in list	Seats in National Assembly
Civil Contract		Nikol Pashinyan	69
Prosperous Armenia		Gagik Tsarukyan	1
Meritocratic Party of Armenia		Gurgen Simonyan	0
"Against all" Democratic party		Spartak Kyureghyan	0
Strong Armenia alliance	Strong Armenia; New Era Party; Unified Armenians Party	Narek Karapetyan	0
Democratic Consolidation Party		Suren Petrosyan	0
Wings of Unity		Arman Tatoyan	0
Bright Armenia		Edmon Marukyan	0
National Democratic Alliance		Gevorg Karapetyan	0
Armenia Alliance	Armenian Revolutionary Federation; Forward Party	Robert Kocharyan	27
Christian Democratic Party		Levon Shirinyan	0
Armenian National Congress		Levon Zourabyan	0
New Power		Hayk Marutyan	0
Hanrapetutyun Party		Aram Sargsyan	0
Alliance Progressive Centrist Party		Tigran Urikhanyan	0
Reformist Party		Vagharshak Harutyunyan	0
Democracy Law Discipline Party (DOK)		Vardan Ghukasyan	0
Kochari National Revival and National Awakening Party		Artak Sargsyan	0
For The Republic Party		Arman Babajanyan	0

== Campaign ==
Former President Serzh Sargsyan said that the Republican Party would not partake in the election: "Our voters' voices will not be lost but will join those of other opposition voters." Samvel Karapetyan renounced his Cypriot and Russian passports to run for office. Armenian National Congress said it would have its own list. Gagik Tsarukyan was chosen to lead Prosperous Armenia.

Hayastan faction MP and Armenian Revolutionary Federation (Dashnaktsutyun)'s Ishkhan Saghatelyan called for the opposition groups to have a joint rally in response to escalating repression. Arman Tatoyan, head of Wings of Unity and Avetik Chalabyan, coordinator of the "HayaQve" National Civil Association, signed a memorandum of cooperation to unify their agenda. Edmon Marukyan's Bright Armenia said they would be running in the election.

Thousands attended the Strong Armenia campaign in Yerevan on April 11.

Civil Contract officially named Pashinyan as its prime ministerial candidate. Pashinyan commented on the opposition in saying that Robert Kocharyan's Armenia Alliance, Karapetyan's Strong Armenia and Tsarukyan's Prosperous Armenia should not enter parliament to end the so-called "formers vs. currents" confrontation.

== Arrests ==
The government arrested 12 detainees, who faced restrictions, in an alleged corruption probe in 2026. Members of the Strong Armenia party Gohar Ghumashyan and Verzhine Stepanyan, were placed under administrative supervision. They were accused of vote buying following the release of a transcript of a telephone conversation with a citizen. The former's lawyer said she was not related to the charges against her. Narek Karapetyan condemned the arrests in saying: "Those who imprison women and fabricate cases against individuals will be replaced in Armenia by a leader who encourages and supports large families."

An 18-year-old was also arrested for attempting to hit Pashinyan during a Holy Mass in Yerevan's Saint Anna Church. It was reported that he had health problems. He was sent to Nairi hospital. In another confrontation, Pashinyan screamed at a Artsakh War veteran: "Why weren't you killed off?" The man was arrested by police and went on a hunger strike.

The Armenian legislature then passed a bill to ban personal names in electoral blocs. Hayk Mamijanyan of the Pativ Unem faction, called the actions "inherently illegal", as did Gegham Manukyan of the Hayastan faction in regards to the Electoral Code prior to the election The Armenian Church condemned the government's plan as "unlawful" and a threat to national unity.

The International Observatory for Democracy in Armenia organization has criticized what it views as democratic backsliding and political persecutions of the opposition, with board member Kenneth Roth describing a "disturbing tendency on the part of the current government to try to suppress opposition points of view and actually to undermine some of the independent institutions that might have served as a check on executive overreach".

== International politics ==
Foreign Policy viewed the 2026 election as geopolitically important for the future of Armenia and the region in the context of the 2026 Iran war and the Russo-Ukrainian war. BRICS members Russia and Iran viewed the actions of the Pashinyan government as hostile to their security interests in the Caucasus, especially Pashinyan's support for the Trump's Route for International Peace and Prosperity (TRIPP). The Iranian–Russian Treaty on Comprehensive Strategic Partnership signed in January 2025 commits both Iran and Russia to preventing the "interference" and "destabilizing presence" of external actors in the region. In May 2026, Russian President Vladimir Putin stated that Pashinyan's plans to have Armenia join the European Union required "special consideration". Drawing parallels between Armenia and Ukraine, he noted that "everything that is happening in respect of Ukraine" began with the country attempting to join the EU. The Netherlands Institute of International Relations Clingendael described the election, quoting an Armenian expert, as "the most geopoliticised elections" Armenia had ever had.

Conversely, the EU, Azerbaijan, and Turkey endorsed Pashinyan. In February, US Vice President JD Vance endorsed Pashinyan. In May, one week before the election, Pashinyan was also endorsed by US President Donald Trump, and Secretary of State Marco Rubio. In April, Azerbaijan's Presidential Special Representative Elchin Amirbekov said that the election, along with Armenia's possible adoption of a new constitution, will "play an important role in signing a [final] peace agreement."

== Disinformation and alleged Russian interference ==
Reuters reported on 29 May 2026, citing interviews with five anonymous Western intelligence officials and "documents" seen by the media outlet, that Russia was intensifying covert efforts to undermine Pashinyan's re-election in order to avoid an Armenian pivot toward the West. These would include disinformation campaigns supporting pro-Russian candidates and a scheme to transport tens of thousands of Russian Armenians to swing the vote. Reuters reported Karapetyan as being the Russian government's preferred candidate according to three of these intelligence officials. According to Bot Blocker, a collective of anonymous Russian dissident tech analysts cited by The Daily Telegraph, Armenia was facing the second-largest state-sponsored disinformation campaign in modern European history, only surpassed by Russia's failed anti-Western campaign at the 2025 Moldovan parliamentary election.

Earlier, in October 2025, the Russian government established a department known as the Directorate for Strategic Cooperation and Partnership, which would have been overseeing influence operations in Armenia according to four of Reuters' sources. Three of the sources stated Russian authorities had calculated a cost of about 50 million dollars to transport 100,000 voters from Russia; the Armenian diaspora is a large one, that in Russia having been estimated at up to over two million people, Armenia's population then being of 3 million. Nevertheless, Armenian citizens were not allowed to vote from abroad at the time. According to those three of Reuters' sources, the Russian government had issued by mid-May quotas of Armenians each Russian federal subject (province) should send, having demanded administrators report back on preparations. At the time of the publication of its report, Reuters stated it was unable to verify if such transporting plan was underway.

Reuters also reported on Russian officials having stepped up existing disinformation campaigns to discredit Pashinyan and his government, citing the intelligence officials. One European official stated the campaigns involved the Kremlin-affiliated bot network Storm-1516, which had participated in interference efforts in recent American elections. Three of the officials stated the Russian government had enlisted Russian political consultancies and think tanks, including the Social Design Agency (SDA), sanctioned in the EU and the United Kingdom for spreading disinformation to undermine support for Ukraine. Reuters accessed five documents in Russian formulated by the SDA according to the sources, something Reuters could not verify. This included one suggesting the creation of a media outlet called Yerevan1 for Russian Armenians to promote a "negative attitude" against Pashinyan and argue that Armenia would be only able to prosper in a close alliance with Russia and under its "protection", the document arguing that the diaspora could play a decisive role in the election if their turnout was high.

The Institute for Strategic Dialogue (ISD) also reported on 27 May 2026 on Storm-1516's activities in Armenia, as well as on the long-running disinformation "Operation Overload", monitored by the ISD since 2024. The Russian Foundation to Battle Injustice (R-FBI), founded by Wagner Group leader Yevgeny Prigozhin, would have also been aiding disinformation efforts in the country, which the ISD described as being aimed at election interference in detriment of Pashinyan and in support of pro-Russian candidates. According to Bot Blocker, on the eve of the election, the pro-Russian bot network Matryoshka conducted a large-scale disinformation campaign against Armenia and Pashinyan, having spread 343 fake videos against Armenia's political leadership which included false reports on a purported serious illness affecting Pashinyan, Armenian preparations for war with Russia or intentions to replace the 102nd Russian military base in Gyumri with a Turkish one. Russian state media outlet RIA Novosti stated on 28 May that Russia was Armenia's only chance at preserving its statehood and that, should Armenia turn away from Russia, it would become a province of "a new Turkish empire".

== Opinion polls ==
Polling firm	Fieldwork date	Sample size	Civil Contract	Armenia Alliance	~~I Have Honor~~	Prosperous Armenia	Republic Party	Strong Armenia	DOC	Wings of Unity	Others	Don't know	Lead
EVN Report	4 May–31 May 2026	1157	36.3	4.8	–	3.1	0.6	12.2	0.9	0.9	15	26.2	24.1
MPG	19 May–21 May 2026	1102	28.8	12.1	–	8.7	–	14.9	3.4	5.8	13.4	12.9	13.9
IRI	5 May–11 May 2026	1511	32	3	–	1	–	6	1	1	2	23	26
EVN Report	1 Apr–2 May 2026	925	32.5	4.4	–	3.4	–	10.1	–	–	7.1	14.1	22.4
MPG	27 Apr–29 Apr 2026	1,101	26.7	8.2	–	7.5	1.7	14.1	3.1	4.2	6.3	8	12.6
EMPIRICA	7–17 Feb 2026; 5–17 Mar 2026	1,600	28	9	–	5	–	24	4	3	2	14	4
EVN Report	23 Feb–31 Mar 2026	861	33.6	4.2	–	3.3	2.3	11.4	–	1.6	4.0	13.7	22.2
IRI	3–13 Feb 2026	1,506	24	3	–	3	1	9	1	1	5	30	15
EVN Report	11 Dec 2025– 22 Feb 2026	747	26.1	3.4	–	6	2.1	11.9	–	2.5	6.3	18.9	14.2
MPG	29 Apr – 2 May 2025	1,100	11.5	8	3.7	3.2	–	–	2.9	–	3.1	18.5	3.5
Parl. election	20 Jun 2021	1,281,375	53.95	21.11	5.22	3.95	3.04	–	–	–	15.77	–	32.8

View source data.

Opinion polling conducted by EMPIRICA ahead of the 2026 Armenian parliamentary elections indicated a highly competitive political landscape between businessman Samvel Karapetyan and Prime Minister Nikol Pashinyan. Nationwide surveys showed near parity between the two figures, with results ranging from 34-35% support for Karapetyan and 33-34% for Pashinyan in head-to-head scenarios.

In Yerevan, Karapetyan held a more pronounced lead, receiving up to 49% support compared to Pashinyan's 24%. The polling also reflected broader public sentiment, including high levels of dissatisfaction with the incumbent government, with up to 75% of respondents in Yerevan and 61% nationwide expressing disapproval of Pashinyan's performance, as well as growing support for opposition forces.

== Results ==
According to official data published by the CEC, the total number of citizens eligible to vote was 2,489,031. The agency also published a list of observers. Voter turnout was 58.97%. According to the CEC, turnout through the regions was higher the closer to the eastern border: According to exit polls Civil Contract was projected to win with 56.7% followed in second place by Strong Armenia at 17.5%. Pashinyan declared victory at ~2:49am on June 8.

Preliminary results revealed that Civil Contract won 49.8% of all votes, enough to secure a parliamentary majority. However, the ruling party fell short of the two-thirds majority needed to call a constitutional referendum demanded by Azerbaijan as part of a peace deal and also by Turkey to restart border trade. Opposition alliances Strong Armenia and Armenia Alliance won 23.2% and 9.9% of the vote respectively. A fourth party, Prosperous Armenia, had initially looked set to enter parliament but a later tally of electronic votes put the party just under the 4% threshold. The question of Prosperous Armenia's entry into the National Assembly of Armenia and the formation of a faction remained uncertain, until the Election Commission announced that Prosperous Armenia did not enter into the Parliament.

Party	Votes	%	Seats	+/–
Civil Contract	726,819	49.89	64	−7
Strong Armenia	340,006	23.34	29	New
Armenia Alliance	144,983	9.95	12	−17
Prosperous Armenia	58,287	4.00	0	0
Wings of Unity	33,537	2.30	0	New
Meritocratic Party of Armenia	30,642	2.10	0	New
Democracy Law Discipline Party	25,758	1.77	0	New
New Power	25,551	1.75	0	New
"Against All" Democratic Party	21,181	1.45	0	New
Hanrapetutyun Party	15,808	1.09	0	0
Bright Armenia	7,439	0.51	0	0
For The Republic Party	6,754	0.46	0	New
National Democratic Alliance	5,481	0.38	0	0
Democratic Consolidation Party	5,269	0.36	0	0
Armenian National Congress	3,143	0.22	0	New
Christian Democratic Party	2,671	0.18	0	New
Kochari National Revival and National Awakening Party	1,986	0.14	0	New
Reformist Party	1,425	0.10	0	New
Total	1,456,740	100.00	105	–2
Valid votes	1,456,740	98.90		
Invalid/blank votes	16,210	1.10		
Total votes	1,472,950	100.00		
Registered voters/turnout	2,506,826	58.76		
Source: Central Electoral Commission (Votes); Central Electoral Commission (Seats)

=== Irregularities ===
Amongst complaints received throughout the day by the CEC, the ruling government said that the Armenia Alliance would be investigated. Prior to election day, the CEC also rejected removing Strong Armenia from the ballot. Eighteen people were arrested by the end of voting hours and the interior ministry reported 619 calls about violations with 338 reports under review. According to Armenian authorities more than 40 people had been arrested in a vote buying scheme connected to Strong Armenia. There were also fears that Russia would bus in Armenians from Russia to aid Strong Armenia.

Prosperous Armenia was reported to be at 4% because the CEC website misleadingly rounded them up. The other two opposition parties implied that they might not take their seats if BHK fails. The party claimed that the CEC website differed from the actual election results in some polling stations demanding a recount. The CEC annulled the results from three polling stations due to electoral violations and stated the election would not be re-run in those stations, which some observers criticized citing the mathematical possibility of Prosperous Armenia overcoming the parliamentary threshold with the cancelled votes.

== Aftermath ==
In his victory speech Pashinyan said "The European Union is our main partner in democratic reform implementation, and we will continue that path," while European Commission President Ursula von der Leyen said the election draws Armenia "ever closer to Europe." Russian foreign ministry spokeswoman Maria Zakharova issued a statement that alleged Western Governments as a collective had put "unprecedented pressure" on the Armenian government to engage in "interference" against the pro-Russian opposition. Also, immediately after the election, Russian President Vladimir Putin also called on Pashinyan to hold an immediate referendum on withdrawal from the Eurasian Economic Union. Joshua Kucera, a senior analyst for the International Crisis Group, stated that Pashinyan will likely try to walk a tightrope of being both pro-EU and pro-EAEU in order to reap benefits from both.

Karapetyan and Strong Armenia rejected the results, claiming the election was rigged against him. He demanded that fresh elections be held and petitioned the Central Electoral Commission to throw out the results. He also went on to say that "Our task is not to be represented in parliament, but to remove Pashinyan." Six opposition parties including Strong Armenia, Armenia Alliance and Prosperous Armenia subsequently issued a joint statement pledging to not recognize the results, citing among other things the alleged improper use of administrative resources and "arbitrary editing of voting results" by the ruling party.
