= Seda Safaryan =

Armenian judge (born 1962)

- Սեդա Սաֆարյան

Justice of the Constitutional Court of Armenia
- Incumbent
- Assumed office 16 December 2022
- Preceded by: Arevik Petrosyan

Personal details
- Born: 8 August 1962 (age 64) Voskevan, Tavush Province, Armenia SSR, Soviet Union
- Education: Yerevan State University

Seda Serhojs Safaryan (Armenian: ԼՍեդա Սերյոժայի Սաֆարյան; born 8 August 1962) is an Armenian lawyer. She has been justice of the Constitutional Court of Armenia since 2022.

== Early life and education ==
Safaryan was born in the village of Voskevan, Tavush Province, then Armenia SSR, Soviet Union. She graduated in law from the Yerevan State University in 1991. Between 1982 and 1985, Safaryan was teacher in a secondary school of Koti.

== Career ==
Between 1988 and 1990, Safaryan was an inspector in the Social Security Department of the Executive Committee of the Yerevan's Nor Nork District. She has been working as lawyer since 1991, as member of the Armenian Bar Association, and practised as an accredited lawyer to the Court of Cassation of Armenia between 2006 and 2007. Safaryan was involved in the trials of the 2008 Armenian presidential election protests and was member of the investigative panel established by Armenian president.

Between 2015 and 2022, she was a member of the Board of Trustees of the Armenian Institute for International and Security Affairs (AIISA), where she led projects on justice, internal security and judicial reform and worked as a specialist in constitutional and public law.

On 30 June 2022 Safaryan was nominated by the Government of Armenia to be the new justice of the Constitutional Court of Armenia, to succeed Arevik Petrosyan, whose term was due to expire at the end of the year. The National Assembly debated and approved unanimously her candidacy on 15 September 2022.

On 16 December 2022, Safaryan was sworn in before the National Assembly. Safaryan took part in the trial concerning the challenge to the results of the 2026 parliamentary elections, although the opposition leader, Robert Kocharyan, submitted a motion to have her excluded, which was rejected.
