= Narek Karapetyan =

Armenian politician

- Նարեկ Կարապետյան

Personal details
- Citizenship: Armenia
- Party: Strong Armenia
- Relatives: Samvel Karapetyan (uncle)
- Occupation: politician, public figure
- Known for: Coordinator of the “Our Way” movement

Narek Karapetyan (Armenian: Նարեկ Կարապետյան) is an Armenian politician and public figure, one of the coordinators of the “Our Way” movement and a member of the council of the Strong Armenia party. He gained public recognition during 2025–2026 through his active involvement in the political movement initiated by Samvel Karapetyan.

== Political activity ==
In August 2025, Narek Karapetyan participated in the official presentation of the "Our Way" popular movement, during which the movement's ideology and political agenda were introduced. In his speeches, he stated that "Our Way" means "the Armenian way", emphasizing the importance of national identity, statehood, and traditional values.

In January 2026, Karapetyan announced that the congress of Strong Armenia, established by the "Our Way" movement, would take place on February 12, during which the party's candidate for prime minister would be presented.

On February 12, 2026, during the official presentation of Strong Armenia, Karapetyan announced that the party's candidate for prime minister was Samvel Karapetyan. In his speech, he stated that "a strong Armenia needs strong leadership" and criticized the policies of the sitting government.

=== 2026 parliamentary election ===
Ahead of the 2026 parliamentary election, Karapetyan became the top candidate on the electoral list of Strong Armenia, and was expected to lead the transitional political processes following the election. Karapetyan was involved in presenting the party's platform in various issues, including economic, tax, and security policy. For the political and economic platform, the party aims to "form a new model of the state" aimed at economic development, improving the investment climate, and increasing the efficiency of public administration. Regarding security, Karapetyan participated in the presentation of the "Strong Peace" program, during which he stated that "the only guarantee of strong and lasting peace is having a strong Armenia."

Karapetyan headed the electoral list of the Strong Armenia alliance for the election. The results showed the alliance finishing second with 23.2% of the vote, becoming the largest opposition force in the National Assembly. Following the vote, Karapetyan stated that he would issue a comprehensive statement after the completion of the vote-counting process.

On 20 June 2026, Karapetyan filed a lawsuit against the state's Investigative Committee for alleging that he concealed foreign citizenship during the process of registration as a parliamentary candidate, which is an obstacle to becoming a public official. Karapetyan rejects any claims of foreign citizenship, and hopes that the claims from the committee can be dismissed and that legal expenses can be reimbursed.

== See also ==
- Samvel Karapetyan (businessman)
- Strong Armenia
