= Liberal Democratic Union of Armenia =

- Abbreviation: HJAM
- Leader: Seyran Avakyan
- Founded: 2001
- Headquarters: Yerevan
- Ideology: Liberalism; Democratic liberalism Pro-Europeanism

Website
- http://www.ldua.am/

The Liberal Democratic Union of Armenia (Armenian: Հայաստանի Ժողովրդավարական Ազատական Միություն, romanized: Hayastani Zhoghovrdavarakan Azatakan Miyutyun) is a liberal political party in Armenia.

== History ==
Following the 2003 Armenian parliamentary election, the party won 4.6% of the popular vote but failed to gain any seats in the National Assembly. The party has not directly participated in any subsequent Parliamentary elections since 2003. In May 2009, members held a party congress to discuss political issues in Armenia and future plans of the party.

In June 2018, the party released a statement supporting the recent Armenian Velvet Revolution and called for an end to corruption and economic monopolies in the country. The party called for new programs to be implemented which will strengthen the country. The party also announced that it would not participate in the 2018 Armenian parliamentary election, but wished the political parties participating in the election integrity and wisdom and urged them to act in an atmosphere of love and tolerance for the sake of solid state building and for the welfare of the people.

On 16 June 2021, the party endorsed the Armenia Alliance ahead of the 2021 Armenian parliamentary elections. They also called on prime minister Nikol Pashinyan to resign. The party had also changed their views regarding the Velvet Revolution and stated that the revolution had destroyed the army, the educational system, and eroded moral values.

In March 2023, the party participated in local elections in the Ani district of Shirak Province. The party formed an electoral alliance with the Reformist Party known as the "Nation-Community" alliance.

The party is currently managed by a board of directors.

== See also ==
- Liberalism in Armenia
- Politics of Armenia
- Programs of political parties in Armenia
