= My Powerful Community =

My Powerful Community Իմ հզոր համայնքը
- Leader: Spartak Tartikyan
- Founded: 2021
- Slogan: "A powerful community - a family"
- National Assembly: 0 / 107

Website
- Facebook page

My Powerful Community (Armenian: Իմ հզոր համայնքը, romanized: Im hzor hamaynk’y), also known as My Strong Community, is an Armenian political party. On 7 October 2021, Spartak Tartikyan became the Chairman of the party.

== History ==
The party was originally established by Narek Samsonyan, it was rebranded in 2021 ahead of local elections occurring throughout Armenia. Spartak Tartikyan became the new leader of the party. It was speculated that the party was re-branded by the Republican Party of Armenia as a way for them to operate in elections under a different name.

In December 2021, the party participated in municipal elections in the town of Vedi, winning the majority of the popular vote. In April 2022, several party members who won seats in the town's local council were terminated from their posts.

The party endorsed the I Have Honor Alliance ahead of the 2021 Armenian parliamentary elections.

In March 2022, during local elections, the party was accused of taking voters by busses to polling stations. Some party members were also accused of having physical altercations with voters.

In August 2022, the party formed an electoral alliance with the Reformist Party ahead of municipal elections in three cities.

In March 2023, the party participated in local elections in the Ani district of Shirak Province.

The party has never participated in national elections and has no political representation within the National Assembly.

== See also ==
- Programs of political parties in Armenia
