= Ministry of Sex proposal (Armenia) =

Proposed hypothetical ministry in Armenia

The Ministry of Sex is a debated political proposal floated in Armenia since early 2026 by certain political features within the Strong Armenia party. Originally introduced during a podcast discussion by figures of the opposition party Strong Armenia, it suggested the establishment of a dedicated government ministry aimed at addressing a perceived lack of sexual satisfaction amongst women in Armenia, which according to the party caused a fall in birth rate and rise in feminist activism. The idea drew backlash and was even the cause of a physical brawl in the National Assembly between members of Strong Armenia and Civil Contract in October 2026.

== History ==
On 31 January 2026, the "Triangle podcast", a podcast co-hosted by Sargis Karapetyan and Levon Sargizov, had sociologist Armen Khachikyan as a guest, who suggested that the root of some women's online behavior which led them to post "hateful comments" online "sometimes using swear words", and their political activity in real life, both were allegedly driven by sexual frustration. Inspired by this Karapetyan stated that under a government led by Strong Armenia all women would be sexually "satisfied", calling for the hypothetical creation of a "Ministry of Sex". The comments drew the attention of feminist activitists, NGOs, human rights organizations and MP of Civil Contract which stated they were "sexist", pushing Karapetyan to publish a response on Instagram stating that his words were "taken out of context". The backlash led some people to file criminal complaint against Sargis. The Telegraph noted that the proposal came from a key member of the Strong Armenia party.

The issue was brought up on 29 October 2026 within the Armenian parliament, prompting Civil Contract members to demand an "apology to women". Initially Narek Karapetayan had an open verbal argument with MP Taron Chakhoyan, before it escalated in a physical clash which led to other MPs to join the fight. As the clash turned increasingly violent a Civil Contract MP threw a chair during the clashes and Chakhoyan willingly poured a glass of water over another MP and another MP broke a table. The violent fight continued in the halls even after the parliamentary session was temporarily dismissed. In the halls armenian security forces had to intervine and separate the two groups by creating a physical human barrier as to avoid further escalations. Due to the clashes an ambulance had to be called to tend after those who were injured. Other individuals had their clothes tore apart.

== Response ==
=== Armenia ===
Responding to the initial proposal, politician Ani Khachatryan from the Hanrapetutyun Party ridiculed the proposal stating her approval of the proposal only "if" the "members of the Karapetyan family" were the first to benefit from the policy.

Nikol Pashinyan, the Prime Minister of Armenia, condemned the violence but defended the Civil Contract MPs, calling the opposition "insolent" whilst stating that he believed that what occurred was normal in parliamentarism. The Prime Minister later mocked the Strong Armenia party name on Facebook referring to the incident, stating that he thought they would be "physically" strong given their name, remarking that they apparently "were not". Rubinyan commented under the comment too, adding that he was disappointed they had started the fight and then fled. Anahit Manasyan, a local human rights activist and lawyer, condemned the incident stating that parliamentary debate should remain peaceful and not escalate into violence.

CIVILNET reported that "numerous" comments called out CNN reportage on the subject whilst allegedly giving "limited reportage" to dynamics related to the 2023 expulsion of Nagorno-Karabakh Armenians.

=== Abroad ===
Rowan Pelling published an opinion piece on The Daily Telegraph calling the idea of a "Sex Ministry" something to that could be considered in the United Kingdom as to teach the "noble art of making love".
