= Arman Tatoyan =

Armenian ombudsman and politician (born 1981)

- Արման Թաթոյան

4th Human Rights Defender (Ombudsperson) of Armenia
- In office 23 February 2016 – 23 February 2022
- Preceded by: Karen Andreasyan
- Succeeded by: Kristinne Grigoryan

Deputy Minister of Justice of Armenia
- In office November 2013 – February 2016

Deputy Representative (Deputy Agent) of the Government of Armenia before the European Court of Human Rights
- In office November 2013 – February 2016

Director of the Foundation “Tatoyan” Center for Law and Justice
- Incumbent
- Assumed office 2022

Personal details
- Born: December 18, 1981 (age 44) Yerevan, Armenia
- Education: Yerevan State University (LL.B.; Master of Jurisprudence; Ph.D.); University of Pennsylvania Law School (LL.M.); Wharton School of the University of Pennsylvania (Business and Law Certificate)
- Occupation: Lawyer, academic

Arman Tatoyan (Armenian: Արման Թաթոյան; born 18 December 1981) is an Armenian public official and human rights expert. He served as the Human Rights Defender (Ombudsman) of Armenia from 2016 to 2022. He is currently the Founder and executive director of the Tatoyan Foundation. In October 2025, Tatoyan announced his return to politics and said he would seek nomination as a candidate for prime minister, affiliated with the "Wings of Unity" political initiative, ahead of 2026 Armenian parliamentary election.

== Education ==
- 1998–2002 — Studied at the Faculty of Law, Yerevan State University, earning a bachelor's degree in law.
- 2002–2004 — Continued at the Faculty of Law, Yerevan State University, earning a master's degree in law.
- 2004–2007 — Completed postgraduate studies (PhD track) at YSU's Department of Criminal Procedure and Criminalistics and holds the Armenian academic degree of Candidate of Legal Sciences (PhD equivalent).
- He is the author and co-author of several monographs and dozens of scholarly articles.
- 2012 — Completed the University of Pennsylvania's Wharton Executive Education “Business and Law” certificate program.
- 2012–2013 — Earned an LL.M. (Master of Laws) from the University of Pennsylvania Law School (Penn Carey Law), and received recognition as a Distinguished Member of the LL.M. Class of 2013.

== Work experience ==
- 2003–2004 – Legal expert at the Center for Environmental Law Protection (Armenia).
- Since 2005 – Lecturer, later associate professor, at the Department of Criminal Procedure and Criminalistics of Yerevan State University.
- 2004–2007 – Senior legal specialist at the Criminal Procedure and Restoration of the Rights of Servicemen Department of the staff of the Human Rights Defender of Armenia.
- 2007 – Adviser to the president of the Criminal Chamber of the Court of Cassation of Armenia.
- 2007–2009 – Legal component coordinator of the South Caucasus Drug Control Programme of the United Nations Development Programme (UNDP).
- 2008 – Lecturer at the Prosecutor's School of Armenia.
- 2009 – Prosecutor at the Organizational and Supervisory Department of the Prosecutor General's Office of Armenia.
- 2009–2011 – Legal coordinator of the program “The EU Human Rights Defender as a National Preventive Mechanism.”
- 2010 – Legal adviser to the Monitoring Commission for the Implementation of Armenia's Anti-Corruption Strategy.
- 2010 – Head of the working group of the joint program of the Human Rights Defender of Armenia and UNDP.
- 2010–2012 – Legal expert for UNDP's Integrated Border Management Programme in the South Caucasus.
- 2010–2012 – Member of the expert group representing Armenia within the UN Convention against Corruption Review Mechanism, coordinated by the UN Office on Drugs and Crime.
- 2010–2013 – Adviser to the Constitutional Court of Armenia.
- Since 2010 – Member of the working group drafting the new Criminal Procedure Code of Armenia.
- Since 2011 – Representative of the Republic of Armenia to the European Committee for the Prevention of Torture.
- 19 November 2013 – Appointed Deputy Minister of Justice of the Republic of Armenia by decision of the prime minister.
- Since 2013 – Permanent adviser to the Council of Europe on support to public monitoring commissions in closed institutions in the Russian Federation and on the prevention of torture.
- Since 2013 – Deputy Agent of the Government of the Republic of Armenia before the European Court of Human Rights.
- 23 February 2016 – Elected Human Rights Defender (Ombudsman) of the Republic of Armenia by the National Assembly of Armenia through a closed, secret ballot (96 votes in favor, 7 against).
- 23 February 2016 – Released from the position of Deputy Minister of Justice of Armenia by decision of the prime minister in connection with appointment to another position.

== Awards ==
- Mkhitar Gosh Medal (2014)
- Award of the president of the National Assembly of Armenia (2004).
