= Katoghike Church, Yerevan =

Cultural heritage monument of Armenia

Katoghike Holy Mother of God Church
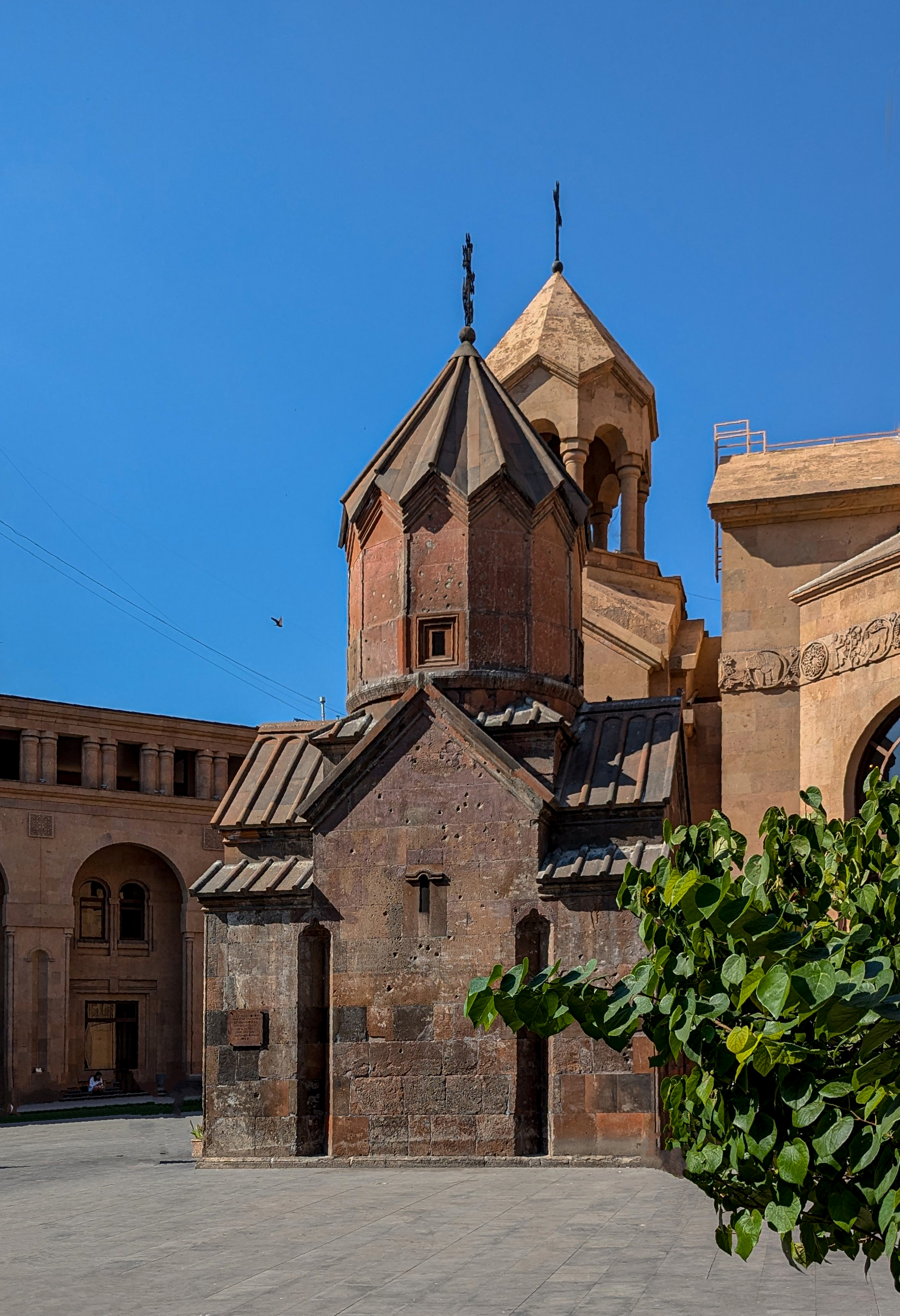
- Katoghike Church in 2024

Religion
- Affiliation: Armenian Apostolic Church
- Ecclesiastical or organisational status: Church
- Status: Active

Location
- Location: Intersection of Abovyan Street and Sayat-Nova Avenue, Kentron District, Yerevan, Armenia
- Interactive map of Katoghike Holy Mother of God Church
- Coordinates: 40.184369°N 44.518978°E

Architecture
- Style: Armenian
- Completed: 1264

Katoghike Holy Mother of God Church (Armenian: Կաթողիկե Սուրբ Աստվածածին եկեղեցի, Kat'oghike Surp Astvatsatsin yekeghetsi) is a small medieval church in the Kentron District of Yerevan, the capital of Armenia.

== History ==
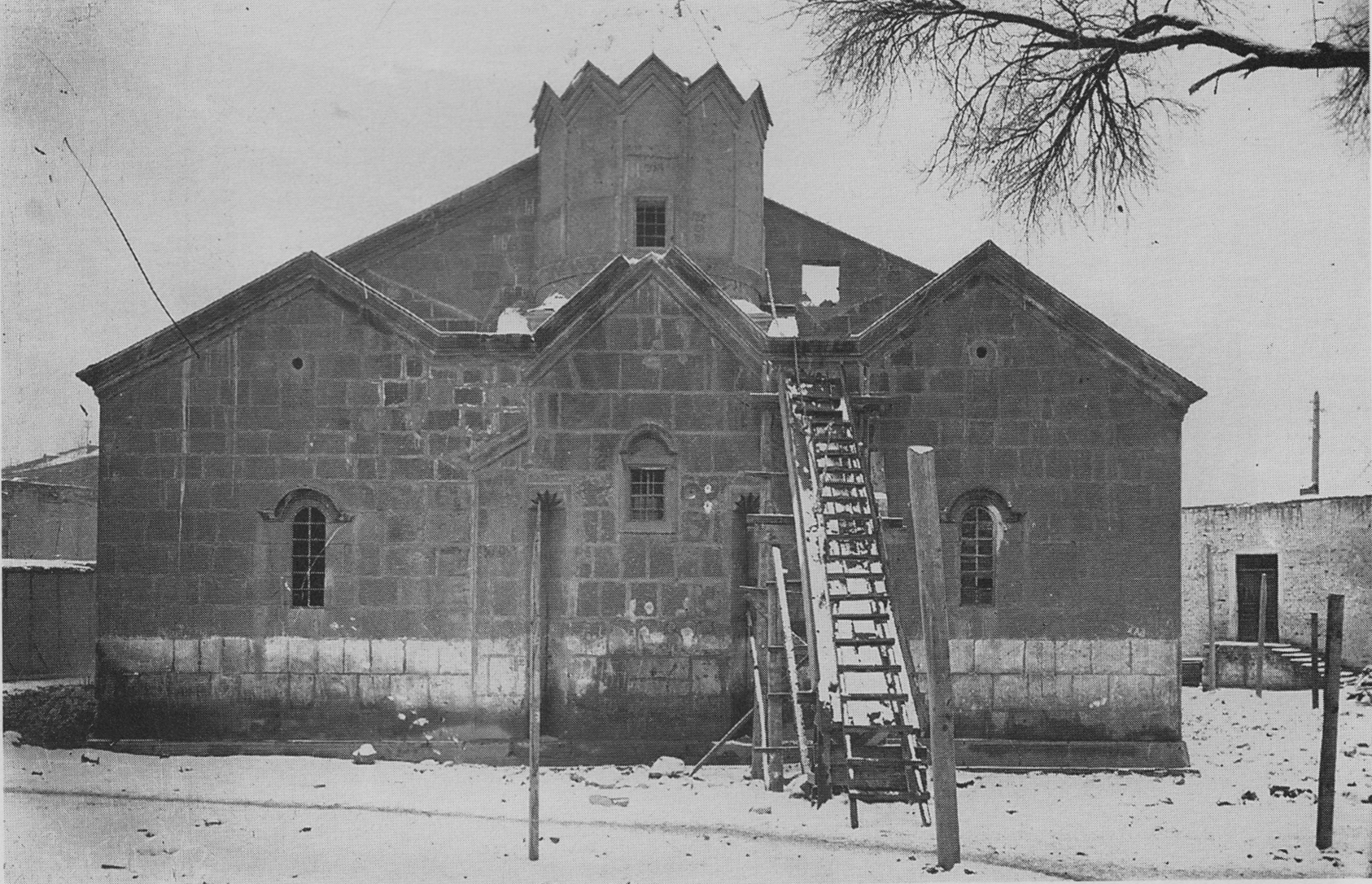
The basilica of the Holy Mother of God, demolished in 1936

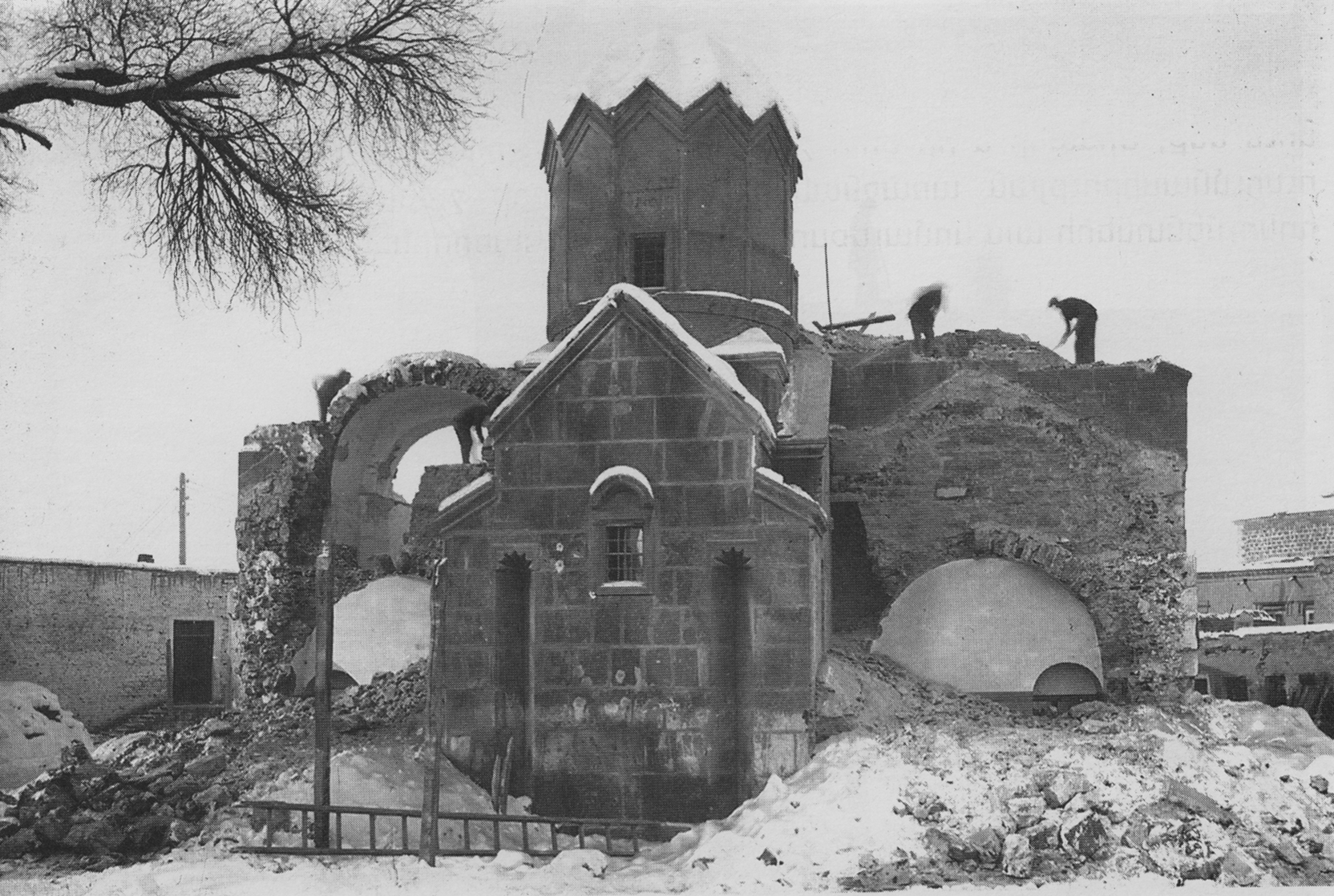
The basilica of the Holy Mother of God, being demolished in 1936

According to the scripts carved on one of the walls of Katoghike Church, the surviving structure dates back to 1264.

After the 1679 Yerevan earthquake, a large basilica named after the Holy Mother of God was built between 1693 and 1695, in the ancient Shahar district of Yerevan, occupying the western edge of the Katoghike Church. The new church was built of typical Armenian tuff stones and did not have a dome. It belonged to the three-nave basilica type of the Armenian church architecture. The church with its prayer hall measuring 14.0 x 19.3 meters, and an outside perimeter of 16.4 x 28.4 meters, was considered one of the most capacious churches of old Yerevan. The church had entrances on the southern and western sides.

In 1936, the basilica of the Holy Mother of God was demolished under the Soviet rule to make way for residential buildings and a linguistic institute at the Sayat-Nova Avenue. During the demolition, the 13th-century church of Katoghike was discovered encased within the structure of the large basilica. After protests from archaeologists, the older church was preserved. Many old khachkars (cross-stones) were found in the walls of the demolished church dating back to the 15th and 17th centuries.

However, the demolished basilica itself had been built on the foundations of an old church known as the Holy Mother of God. The hypothesis that this old church had existed was completely confirmed during the demolition of the Katoghike Church, when the southern and northern walls to which the two vestries were annexed were opened. The oldest inscriptions found on these walls date back to 1264. There are inscriptions engraved on the western façade dating back to the years 1284, 1229 and to the sixteenth century, whereas on the northern walls the inscriptions refer to the year 1609. Consequently, a chapel has probably been built early in the 17th century at the western side of the Holy Mother of God Church at whose site the building of the Katoghike Church was erected toward the end of the same century. This finding was significant in that it confirms the conclusion that the St. Holy Mother of God Church was the only one of the churches of Yerevan that survived and stood firm after the earthquake.

The current Holy Mother of God Church, which continues to bear the name of Katoghike, is relatively of small size (5.4 x 7.5 m). Due to its very limited space, it serves only as a prayer house.

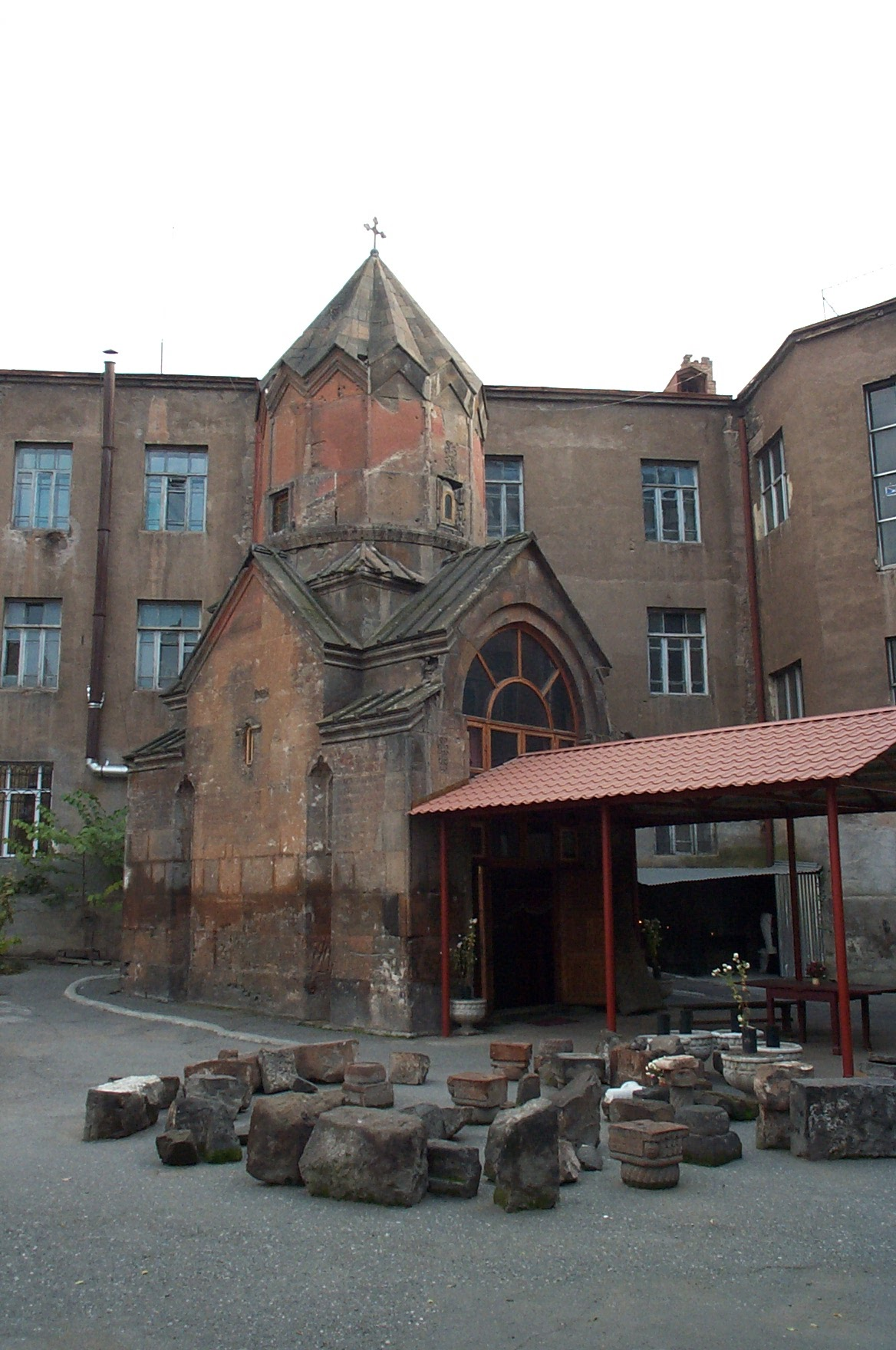
Katoghike Church in 2001

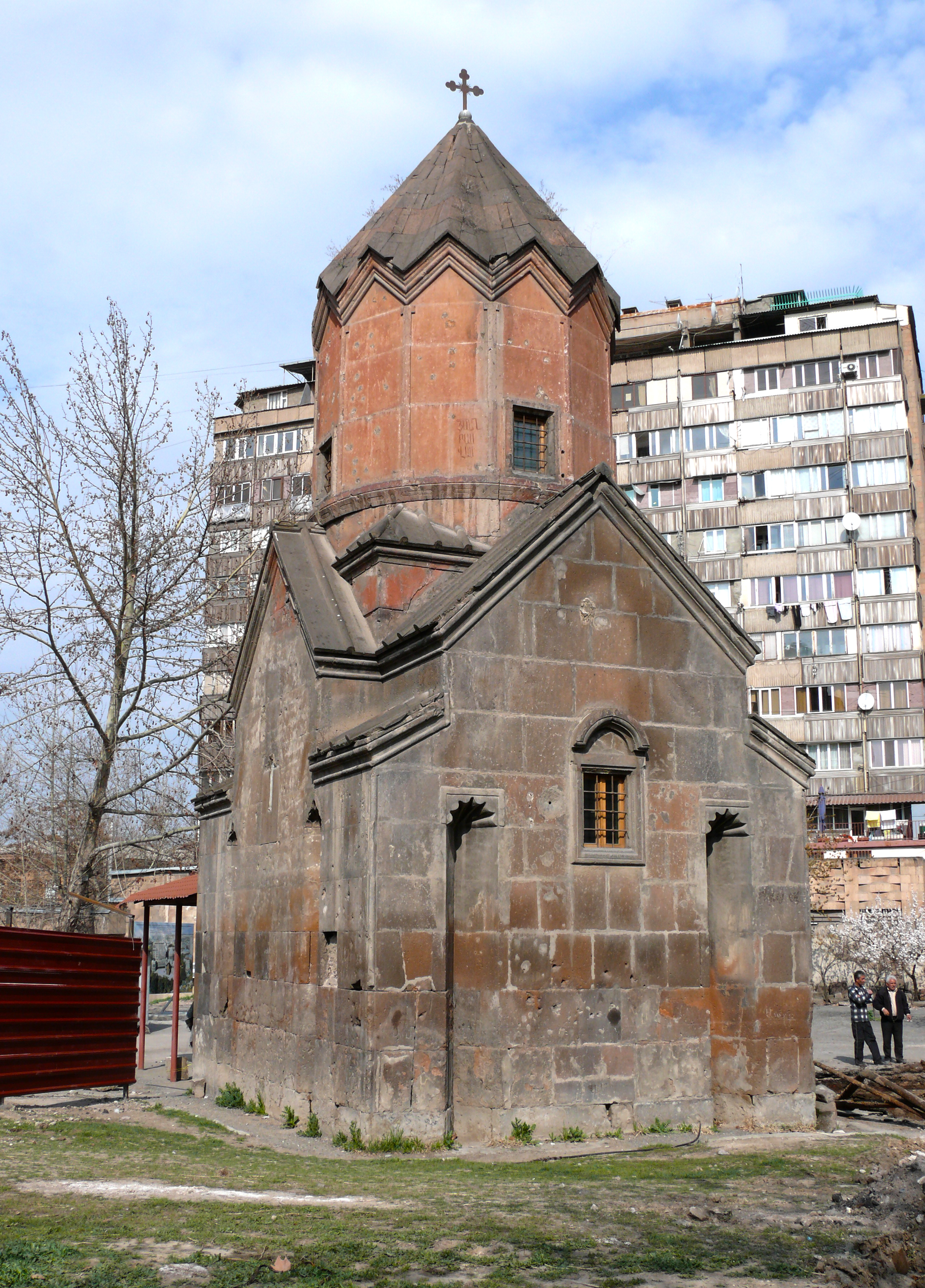
Katoghike Church before construction of St. Anna Church

== Saint Anna Church ==
The new complex of Saint Anna Church in 2026

A new religious complex was constructed to the north of the church. The new complex includes a much bigger church, named after Saint Anna, and a building designated to serve as the Yerevan residence of the Catholicos. On July 4, 2009, a ground blessing service was conducted by Catholicos Karekin II for the construction of Saint Anna Church and the associated complex. The ceremony was attended by President Serzh Sargsyan; President of the Constitutional Court, Gagik Harutyunian; Mayor of Yerevan, Gagik Beglarian; Members of the Brotherhood of Holy Etchmiadzin, Members of the Supreme Spiritual Council national and benefactors Hirair Hovnanian and his wife through the H. Hovnanian Family Foundation. The architect is Vahagn Movsisyan.

Finally, on 30 April 2015, the Saint Anna Church was consecrated by Catholicos Karekin II.
