= Wings of Unity =

Political party in Armenia

Wings of Unity Միասնության թևեր
- Leader: Arman Tatoyan
- Founder: Arman Tatoyan
- Founded: 15 April 2026
- Headquarters: Yerevan, Armenia
- National Assembly: 0 / 105

Website
- uwings.am/en

Wings of Unity (Armenian: Միասնության թևեր, romanized: Miasnutyan Tever) is an Armenian political party founded in 2026 by former Human Rights Defender Arman Tatoyan. The party ran in the 2026 Armenian parliamentary election but failed to win any seats.

== History ==
=== Formation of movement ===
Wings of Unity began as a political movement in October 2025 founded by former Human Rights Defender Arman Tatoyan, with supporters focused on national security, strengthening public institutions and maintaining social cohesion.

In late October 2025, Wings of Unity announced cooperation with the nationalist Shant Alliance. The parties noted that the basis of cooperation is the national-state ideology and common approaches to security issues. Since that period, the initiative has been organizing public meetings, discussions, and regional visits.

From 2025 to 2026, members of "Wings of Unity" made a number of statements on the topics of Armenia's border security, the return of prisoners of war, the reorganization of the army, and foreign policy. The initiative also actively addressed social issues, emphasizing the need for job creation, youth involvement and regional development, and the involvement of pensioners in the development of the state.

=== Party registration ===
In April 2026, Wings of Unity was officially registered as a political party. The same month, the party held a party congress, the party approved an electoral list and a management team with the intent to participate in the 2026 Armenian parliamentary election independently.

=== 2026 election ===
On 9 October 2025, Wings of Unity announced its intent to participate in the 2026 Armenian parliamentary election, receiving #6 for the pre-election campaign.

After the election, the party only received 2.3% of the votes, falling below the 4% electoral threshold and failing to win any seats in the National Assembly.

== Ideology ==
Wings of Unity is opposed to the governing Civil Contract party, and is considered as part of the Armenian opposition.

The party's published policy proposals include:

- National security
- Formation of a professional army
- Social protection
- Job creation
- Increase minimum wage and pensions
- Develop military industry
- Combat against poverty
- Amend electoral laws
- Human and legal development
- Constitutional state
