= Samvel Karapetyan (businessman) =

Armenian billionaire and politician (born 1965)

- Սամվել Կարապետյան
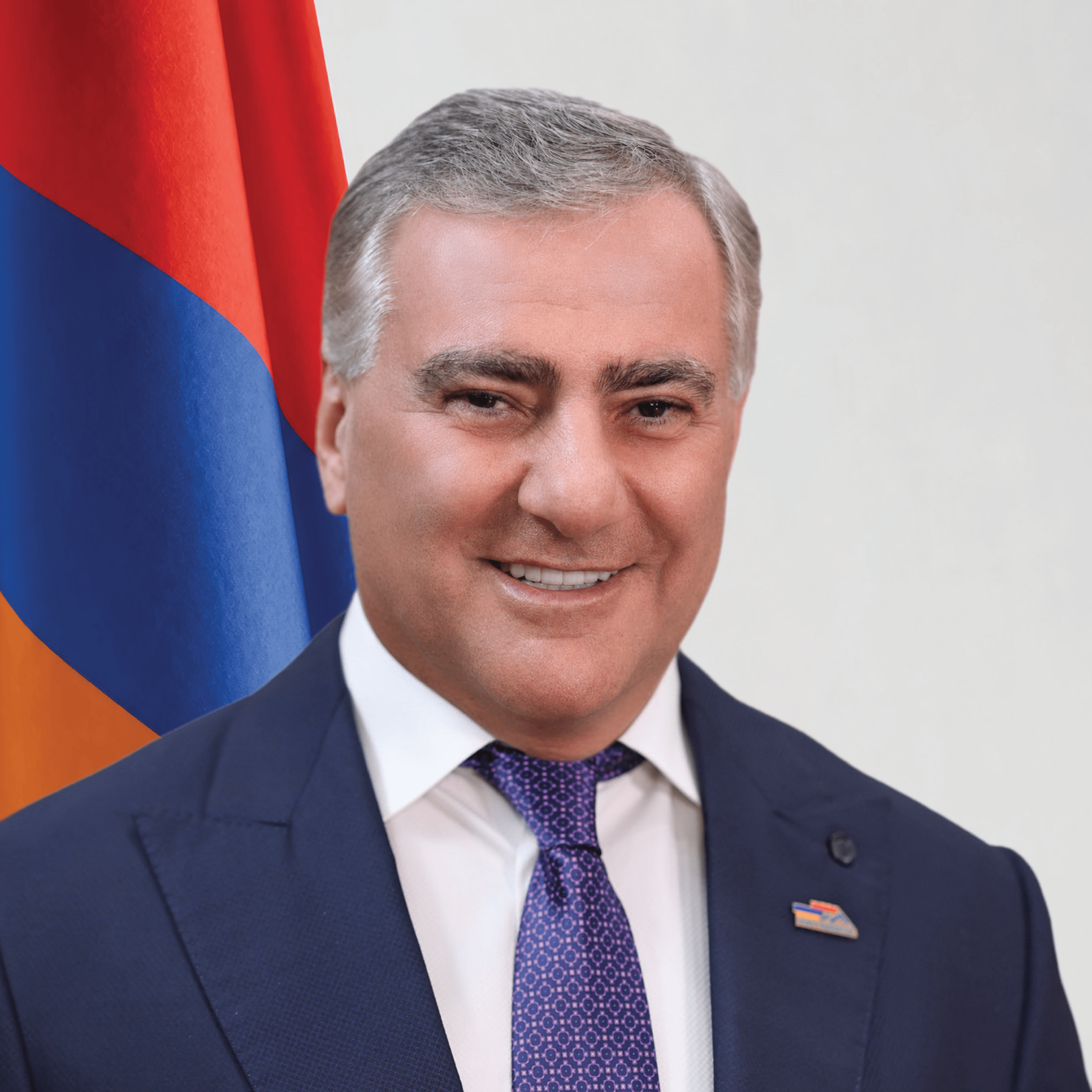
- Karapetyan in 2026

Leader of Strong Armenia
- Incumbent
- Assumed office February 11, 2026
- Preceded by: Position established

Personal details
- Born: August 18, 1965 (age 61) Kalinino, Armenian SSR, Soviet Union (now Tashir, Lori, Armenia)
- Party: Strong Armenia
- Children: 3
- Education: Yerevan Polytechnic Institute
- Occupation: Property developer
- Awards: • Order of St. Mesrop Mashtots

Samvel Sargsi Karapetyan (Armenian: Սամվել Սարգսի Կարապետյան; Russian: Самвел Саркисович Карапетян; born August 18, 1965) is an Armenian billionaire businessman and politician. He is the owner of Tashir Group conglomerate, with businesses spanning real estate, energy, construction, retail and infrastructure.

In 2026, Karapetyan was announced as leader of the newly formed Strong Armenia party, which contested the June 2026 parliamentary election as the leading opposition force.

== Biography ==
Karapetyan was born on August 18, 1965, in the town of Kalinino (today Tashir) in the Lori region of Soviet Armenia. He graduated from the Faculty of Mechanical Engineering of Yerevan Polytechnic Institute in 1986.

After the dissolution of the Soviet Union in 1991, Karapetyan moved to Russia and in 1997, he became the president of the Kaluga-based Kalugaglavsnab OAO, which provides logistics services, including to Russia's state gas company Gazprom. He then expanded into Moscow's real estate market.

In 1999, he established the Tashir Group, a conglomerate of industrial, construction, supply and delivery companies, hotels, restaurants and other firms now numbering more than 200 in total and employing more than 30,000 people. The group has made a number of investments and philanthropic endeavors in Armenia and the then-Republic of Artsakh. Tashir Group owns two large shopping complexes in Yerevan, as well as a major Armenian electricity company, Electric Networks of Armenia, among other enterprises. In 2013, Karapetyan financed the construction of a new hospital in Stepanakert, capital of the Republic of Artsakh. At the end of October 2020, Karapetyan vowed to rebuild the maternity hospital of Stepanakert that was destroyed by the Azerbaijani bombardment on October 28. In September 2021, he announced that Tashir Group plans to invest $600 million to expand and modernize Armenia's energy sector.

In November 2017, Karapetyan was appointed the president of the football club FC Ararat Moscow, which represented the Armenian diaspora in Russia. In January 2018, Karapetyan was named by the US Treasury Department in the so-called Putin list, consisting of 114 senior political figures and 96 oligarchs, all of whom reportedly rose to prominence under Russian President Vladimir Putin.

In June 2020, Karapetyan paid part of the 2 billion dram bail for ex-president of Armenia Robert Kocharyan's release from custody. One of the most significant philanthropists in Armenia, he is also one of the largest benefactors of the Armenian Apostolic Church.

== Political career ==
Samvel Karapetyan's direct involvement in the political life of Armenia intensified in 2025 amid tensions between Prime Minister Nikol Pashinyan and the Armenian Apostolic Church. In June 2025, while in Etchmiadzin for the fortieth-day memorial service of his father, Karapetyan commented on the situation surrounding the Armenian Apostolic Church during an interview with a News.am journalist, stating: "A small group, having forgotten Armenian history and the thousand-year history of the Armenian Church, has attacked the Armenian Church and the Armenian people... Since I have always stood by the Armenian Church and the Armenian people, I will have direct participation. If politicians fail, then we too will participate in our own way." Following this, the Armenian authorities accused him of making public calls aimed at usurping power. After statements by Nikol Pashinyan, law enforcement authorities carried out operations at Karapetyan's mansion located in the Kanaker-Zeytun District of Yerevan, near Victory Park. The following day, on 18 June, Samvel Karapetyan was arrested. His supporters and several opposition figures later described him as a political prisoner, arguing that the case against him was politically motivated.

In July 2025, while under arrest, Karapetyan announced the creation of the "Our Way" movement, presenting it as an alternative political force ahead of the 2026 Armenian parliamentary elections. The founders of the movement stated that their goal was to establish "a new political agenda based on national interests," including the restoration of state institutions, the promotion of economic development, the protection of national values, the strengthening of the role of the Armenian Apostolic Church, as well as the protection of the rights of Armenians displaced from Nagorno-Karabakh. In January 2026, members of the "Our Way" movement registered the Strong Armenia Party. The party's platform emphasized the ideas of "a strong state, a strong economy, and a strong society." The party advocated for the reorganization of security and the armed forces, a "strong and dignified diplomacy" in foreign policy, the promotion of investment in the economy, support for small and medium-sized businesses, as well as demographic growth and the expansion of social policy.

On 11 February 2026, Karapetyan was elected chairman of the Strong Armenia Party, and the following day the party officially nominated him as its candidate for Prime Minister in the 2026 parliamentary elections. In his speeches, Karapetyan stated that the party's goal was to "restore Armenia's sovereignty, security, and economic potential" and create "a professional system of governance." The party program highlighted the following priorities:

1. Reorganization of national security and the armed forces.
2. Economic development and promotion of investment.
3. Support for small and medium-sized businesses.
4. Expansion of social and demographic policy.
5. Protection of national and spiritual values.

Karapetyan announced that he was renouncing his Russian and Cypriot citizenships to be eligible for the office of prime minister. Since the Armenian constitution requires that a candidate for the office of prime minister have resided in the country for the previous four years and hold only Armenian citizenship during that period, the Strong Armenia Party's parliamentary list was headed by Karapetyan's nephew Narek Karapetyan. The party stated that it would change the relevant law in order to enable Samvel Karapetyan to hold office if it won the election.

=== 2026 parliamentary election ===
In the 2026 Armenian parliamentary election, the Strong Armenia alliance led by Samvel Karapetyan emerged as the second-largest political force, receiving 23.27% of the vote according to the final results announced by the Central Electoral Commission. The ruling Civil Contract party of Prime Minister Nikol Pashinyan won 49.74% of the vote and retained its parliamentary majority. Following the election, Strong Armenia became the largest opposition force in the National Assembly.

== Philanthropic and public activities ==
In 2000, Samvel Karapetyan founded the Tashir Charitable Foundation, through which numerous educational, healthcare, cultural, infrastructural, and spiritual projects have been implemented in Armenia, Artsakh, and the Armenian diaspora. The main areas of his philanthropic activity include initiatives aimed at the development of Armenia, the preservation of national identity, and support for Armenian communities. With Karapetyan's support, a number of major projects were implemented in Armenia and Artsakh:

- In 2013, he financed the construction of a modern Republican Hospital in Stepanakert, which became one of Artsakh's most important medical centers.
- In the same year, he allocated around 2 million US dollars for the construction of the strategic Vardenis–Martakert highway, which played an important role in strengthening the connection between Armenia and Artsakh.
- He supported the renovation and construction of churches, educational institutions, and cultural facilities in various settlements across Armenia.
- In 2019, he financed the reconstruction and improvement works of the Catholicosal Residence of the Mother See of Holy Etchmiadzin, including the construction of a new ceremonial hall and chapel.
- Over the years, he has supported social programs, youth initiatives, and healthcare projects in Armenia.
- He provided assistance to families affected by the Nagorno-Karabakh conflicts, military personnel, and displaced persons.

Karapetyan also played an active role in consolidating the Armenian business community.

- In 2017, he participated in the establishment of the Investors Club of Armenia, aimed at promoting investment in Armenia's economy.
- In 2019, he took part in the formation of the Association of Armenian Entrepreneurs, contributing to the development of cooperation and economic initiatives among Armenian businesspeople.

Following the 2020 Beirut explosion, Samvel Karapetyan provided assistance to the Armenian community in Lebanon by allocating financial aid for the restoration of Saint George Church and for the families of Armenian victims.

== Legal issues ==
In April 2021, the Prosecutor General's Office of Azerbaijan opened a criminal case against Karapetyan for allegedly illegally transporting weapons to the Republic of Artsakh, which Karapetyan denied, and ultimately this criminal case did not result in proof of wrongdoing.

On 18 June 2025, Karapetyan was arrested for allegedly making public calls to usurp power and transporting military equipments, violating Part 2 of Article 422 of Armenia's Criminal Code. Karapetyan had publicly defended the Armenian Apostolic Church. Karapetyan had stated that "a small group, having forgotten Armenian history and the millennia-old legacy of the Armenian Church, has attacked the Armenian people. I have always stood with the Armenian people. If political leaders fail, we will intervene in our own way". Armenian Prime Minister Nikol Pashinyan alleged that the Russian government was using Karapetyan to wage a "hybrid operation" in the "hybrid war" against the Armenian government. This was denied by Karapetyan's supporters, who in turn accused Pashinyan of seeking excuses for what they describe as undemocratic tendencies.

After Karapetyan's arrest, Russia said it "[did] not wish to interfere in Armenia's internal affairs, but [are] watching everything related to a Russian national with the utmost attention". Karapetyan said from prison that his arrest was done at behest of the Azeri government, which had issued an arrest warrant for him four years ago. He said the government had destroyed Armenia's external security, ruined relations with Russia and with its military partners and "sold the public illusions" about "dreams of peace". Former President Robert Kocharyan denounced the arrest as a "national disgrace" and described Pashinyan's actions as "anti-national and unlawful". Tigran Abrahamyan, secretary of I Have Honor Alliance said the arrest appears to be aimed at removing support for the Church and "will achieve nothing." Karapetyan was ultimately transferred from prison to house arrest.

== Awards ==
In 2011, President of Armenia Serzh Sargsyan awarded Karapetyan with the Mesrop Mashtots Medal "for significant contribution to the promotion of national interests, long term and fruitful pro-Armenian activities, dedication to the development and advancement of the Republic of Armenia and provided services."

== Wealth ==
According to Forbes, his net worth in September 2021 was estimated at $5 billion. In March 2013 Karapetyan became the richest ethnic Armenian in the world, overtaking Armenian-American businessman Kirk Kerkorian.

Year	2010	2011	2012	2013	2014	2015	2016	2017	2018	2019	2020	2021	2022	2023	2024
Wealth ($ billion)	0,75	1,4	1,6	3,8	4,3	4,0	3,1	3,4	3,7	3,7	2,5	3,3	1,1	2,7	2,9
Ranking (in the world)		879	804	353	345	418	549	564	606	568	836				1143

== Personal life ==
Karapetyan is married and has three children (two sons and a daughter). Karapetyan's son, Sarkis, and daughter, Tatevik, are top managers of Tashir. Tatevik also heads the area of cinema chain development. He owns an 85 meter Lürssen superyacht named ACE.
