= Saint Anna Church, Yerevan =

Armenian Apostolic Church opened 2015

Coordinates: 40.1844°N 44.5191°E

Saint Anna Church
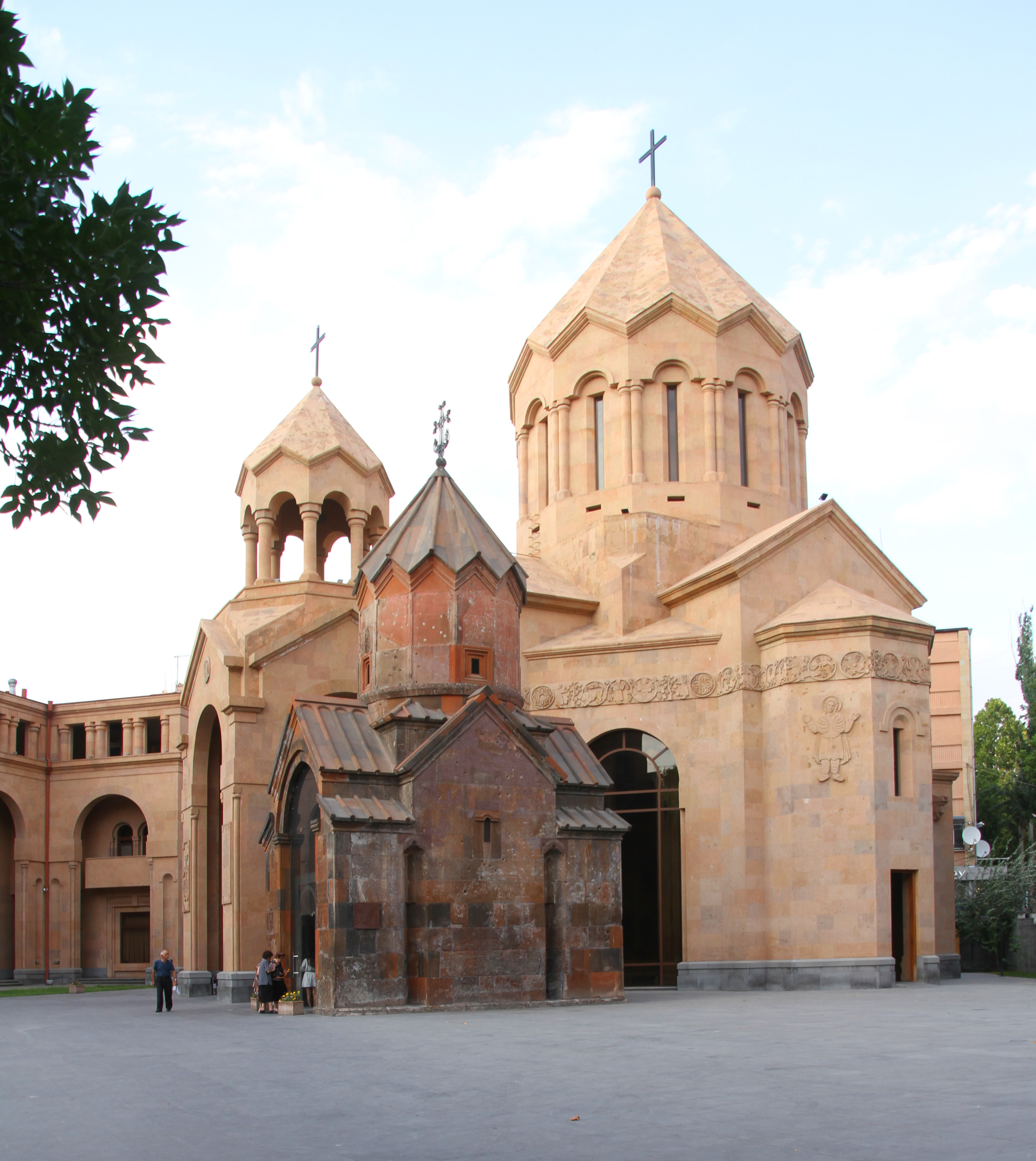
- Surp Anna Church and Katoghike Church

- Location within Armenia

Religion
- Affiliation: Armenian Apostolic Church
- Year consecrated: 2015

Location
- Location: Abovyan Street, Kentron District, Yerevan, Armenia

Architecture
- Architect: Vahagn Movsisyan
- Type: Armenian
- Style: Cruciform
- Groundbreaking: 2011
- Completed: 2014
- Dome: 1

Saint Anna Church (Armenian: Սուրբ Աննա Եկեղեցի Surb Anna Yekeghets'i) is an Armenian Apostolic Church opened in 2015 in the Kentron District of Yerevan, Armenia, adjacent to the 13th-century Katoghike Church.

== History ==
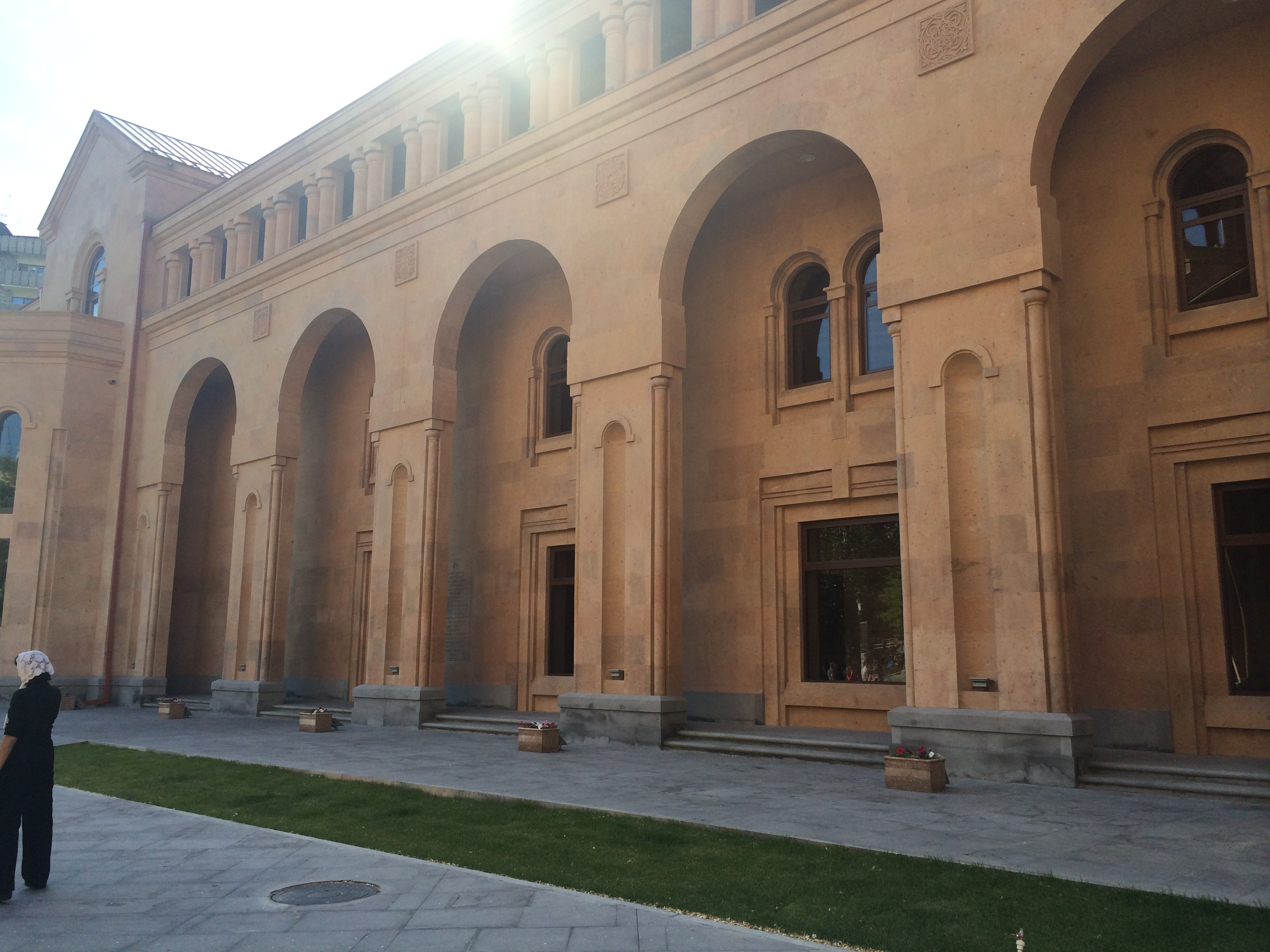
The pontifical residence at the churchyard

On July 4, 2009, a ground blessing service was conducted by Catholicos Karekin II for the construction of Saint Anna Church and an adjacent complex intended to serve as the Yerevan residence of the Catholicos. The ceremony was attended by President Serzh Sargsyan; President of the Constitutional Court, Gagik Harutyunian; Mayor of Yerevan, Gagik Beglarian; members of the Brotherhood of Holy Etchmiadzin, members of the Supreme Spiritual Council national and Armenian-American benefactors Hirair Hovnanian and his wife, Anna, after whom the church has been named.

Construction commenced in 2011 and was completed in 2014. On April 30, 2015, the church was consecrated by Catholicos Karekin II.

Based on a design by architect Vahagn Movsisyan, the church is of single-domed cruciform style with a belfry at the entrance. The pontifical residence is located to the west of the church.
