= Arevik Petrosyan =

Armenian judge

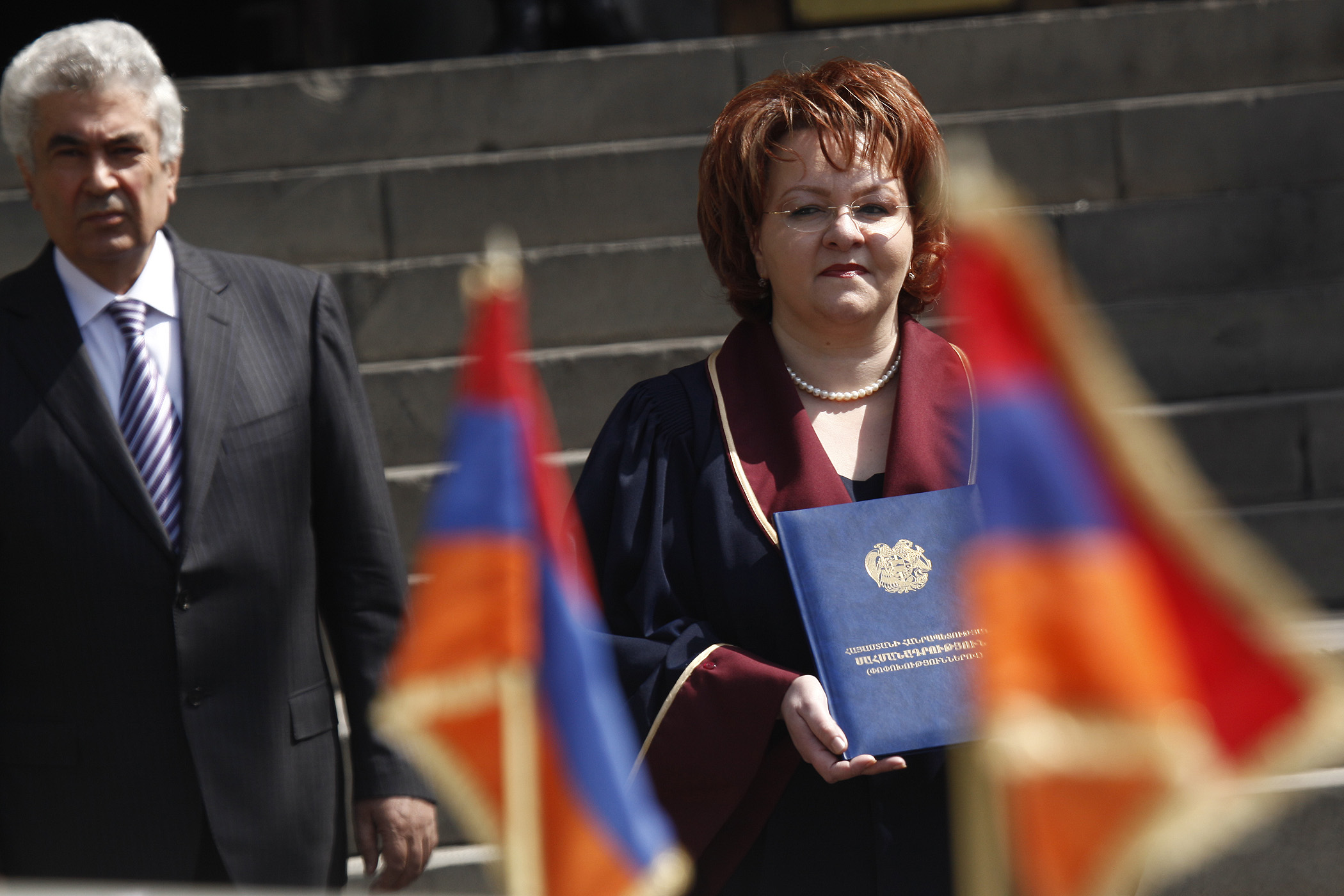
- At Serzh Sargsyan's inauguration in 2013

Justice of the Constitutional Court of Armenia
- In office 2010–2022
- Succeeded by: Seda Safaryan

Member of the National Assembly
- In office 2007–2010

Personal details
- Born: December 9, 1972 (age 53) Leninakan, Armenian SSR, Soviet Union
- Party: Prosperous Armenia
- Education: Yerevan State University (PhD)

Arevik Petrosyan (born 9 December 1972) is an Armenian judge and lawyer. She was justice of the Constitutional Court of Armenia between 2010 and 2022.

== Career ==
Petrosyan was born on 9 December 1972. She graduated from Yerevan State University with a degree from the Department of Law with honors in 1994. Continuing on with post-graduate studies at the same university, she was awarded a Candidate of Sciences (doctorate) in law in 1997, her thesis being "Legal State: General Description, Principles of Organizing and Directions of Activity".

From 1994 to 1999, Petrosyan held various positions in the office of the President of Armenia, before being appointed Deputy Minister of Justice, a post she held until 2002. In 2002, she was appointed to the first of two terms as a deputy chairperson of the Council of Civil Service, the second beginning in 2007. On May 12, 2007, she was elected to the National Assembly as a member of the Prosperous Armenia party. One of the leaders of Prosperous Armenia, she was elected vice president of the National Assembly on November 12. As of March 2010, this is the highest Armenian government position ever held by a woman. On October 7, 2010, she gave up the office to another member of her party at the instigation of Prosperous Armenia. On December 8, President Serzh Sargsyan appointed Petrosyan to the Constitutional Court of Armenia, where she served until 2022.
