= Meritocratic Party of Armenia =

Meritocratic Party of Armenia Հայաստանի Շնորհապետական Կուսակցություն
- Abbreviation: MPA
- Leader: Gurgen Simonyan
- Founded: 27 February 2025; 20 months ago
- Headquarters: Yerevan, Armenia
- Ideology: Meritocracy; Neoliberalism; Pro-Western; Pro-Europeanism; Anti-Russian sentiment
- Political position: Centre-right
- National Assembly: 0 / 107

Party flag
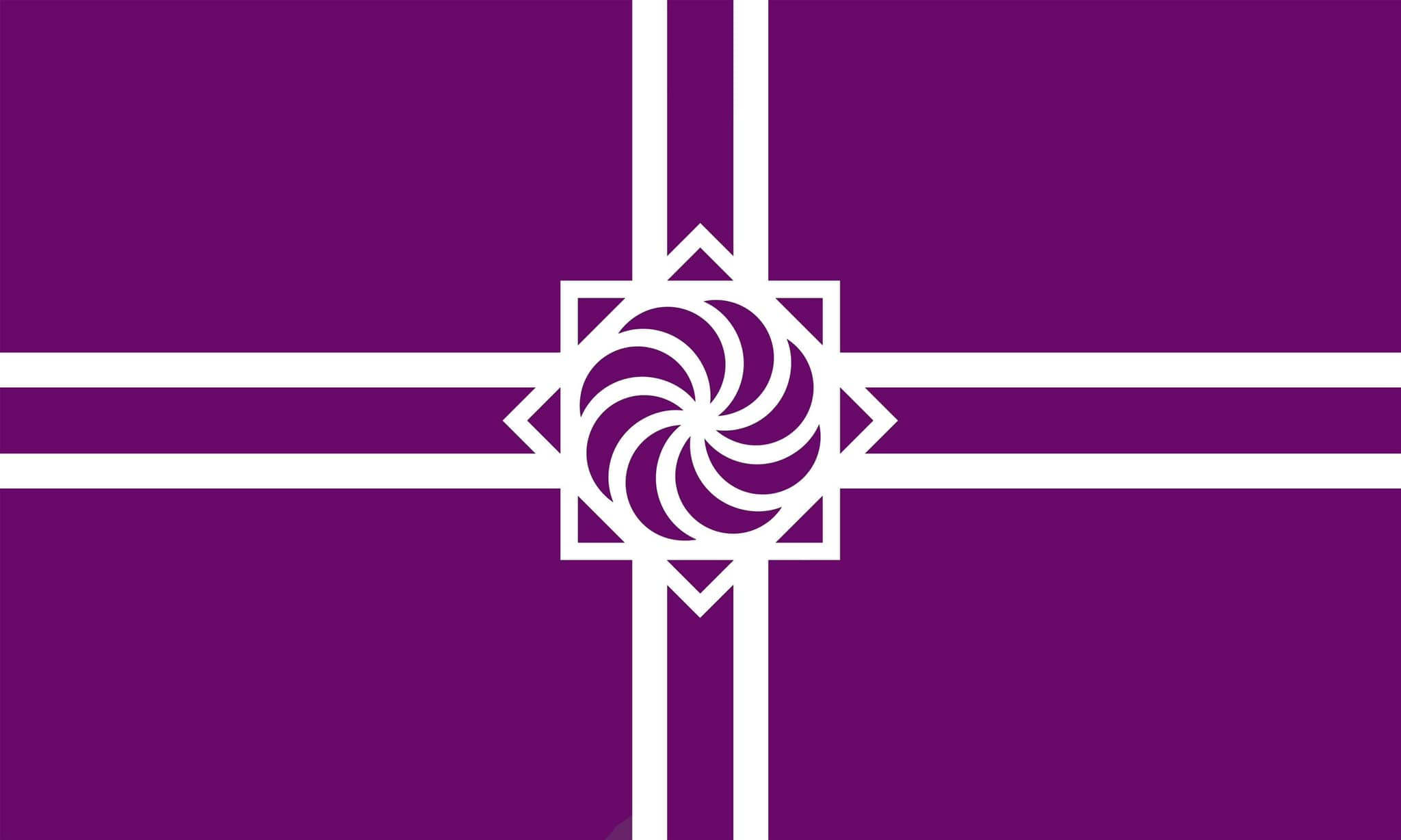

Website
- mpa.am

The Meritocratic Party of Armenia (MPA) (Armenian: Հայաստանի Շնորհապետական Կուսակցություն, romanized: Hayastani Shnorhapetakan Kusakts’ut’yun or Armenian: Հայաստանի Մերիտոկրատական կուսակցություն, romanized: Hayastani Meritokratakan kusakts’ut’yun), is an Armenian political party that is headquartered in Yerevan. It is led by political scientist Gurgen Simonyan.

== History ==
On 28 May 2024, Gurgen Simonyan, a former researcher at the Armenian National Academy of Sciences, announced his entry into politics, initiating the formation of a new, alternative political party. The party held its founding congress on 27 February 2025 in Yerevan, with over 500 delegates in attendance. Party members elected Simonyan as party chairman.

The party opposes the former and current ruling governments of Armenia and seeks to establish a government which does not involve members of former governments. Simonyan has stated his opposition to cooperating with both Robert Kocharyan and Nikol Pashinyan.

The party has no political representation within the National Assembly and currently acts as an extra-parliamentary force.

== Ideology ==
The party believes in the values of meritocracy and promoting individuals based on merit. The party also advocates for including more women in prominent positions within government. The party identifies as Pro-European and Pro-Western. The party supports Armenia strengthening its democracy, conducting reforms, and deepening its European integration, while also supporting Armenia's membership in the European Union.

The party advocates for the elimination of Russian influence in the country and supports the withdrawal of Armenia from all Russian led organizations including the Collective Security Treaty Organization, the CIS, and the Eurasian Economic Union. On 27 June 2024, during an interview, Simonyan criticized Russia's role in the Second Nagorno-Karabakh War stating that "Russia together with Azerbaijan attacked us" and also criticized pro-Russian forces for attempting to destabilize Armenia, attack government buildings, and trying to seize power illegitimately during the 2024 Armenian protests.

Simonyan supports Armenia developing military ties with the United States and supports Armenia buying weapons from Western countries. In July 2024, Simonyan called for the withdrawal of all Russian troops stationed in Armenia.

The party has released several statements in support of Ukraine and condemning the Russian invasion.

== See also ==
- Programs of political parties in Armenia
