= Arevik Tserunyan =

Armenian artist

- Born: Arevik Tserunyan; August 6, 1987 (age 39); Yerevan, Armenia
- Education: Yerevan Brusov State University of Languages and Social Sciences; Yerevan State Academy of Fine Arts; Tufts University
- Known for: drawing painting collage sculpture fashion

Arevik Tserunyan (Armenian: Արևիկ Ծերունյան, born on August 6, 1987, in Yerevan) is an Armenian artist.

== Biography ==
Arevik Tserunyan was born in 1987 in Yerevan, Armenia. Tserunyan received her BA in English, Spanish and Pedagogy from Yerevan State Linguistic University and an MFA from the Yerevan State Academy of Fine Arts (YSAFA), spending a semester abroad at École Supérieure des Beaux-Arts de Marseille, France. During her MFA studies at YSAFA, Tserunyan focused on drawing and painting. She specialized in Western Impressionistic and Armenian Post-Impressionistic styles, a mixture of constructivism and post-soviet artistic movements influenced by the Russian traditional academic school. In her second year at YSAFA, she received a commission for illustrations of a Bulgarian Fairy Tales book, which was published the following year.

In 2013–2015, Tserunyan enrolled in the Master of Fine Arts Program at the School of the Museum of Fine Arts at Tufts University (SMFA at Tufts) in Boston, MA, during which she began exploring other media with new works in collage, sculpture, and fashion with large-scale installations. After graduating from SMFA at Tufts, Tserunyan received a post-graduate fellowship to design and teach an introductory drawing course. In parallel, she worked as Curator's Assistant at the Armenian Museum of America in Watertown, MA, and had her first solo show, The Lost Empire, a sculptural installation with accompanying performance.

In 2016 Tserunyan worked as Children's and Adults' Art Instructor at Danielyan Art Studio in Yerevan. Her solo exhibition Terror (collage, 2D and 3D installations) was held at Artists' Union of Armenia, Yerevan, on December 24–25, 2016.

In 2017 Tserunyan received an O-1 visa (defined by the Department of State as "visa for extraordinary abilities") to work at the Armenian Museum of America as the Artist-in-Residence. During her residency, Tserunyan completed a number of art projects, among them the solo show Amper (Clouds in Armenian) on October 23, 2018, to April 20, 2019. Amper is a multimedia installation consisting of collage and video projection on Armenian needle laces. She has also led the Art School at the Museum since July 2017.

In May 2018, Tserunyan had a solo show at MIT as part of the Armenian genocide commemoration ceremony. In July 2018, Tserunyan took part in the group show Resistance and Resiliency along with three other Armenian women artists. The show took place at the Galatea Gallery in Boston, MA, under the curation of Marsha Odabashian.
