= Democratic Consolidation Party =

Political party in Armenia

Democratic Consolidation Party Ժողովրդավարական համախմբում կուսակցություն
- Abbreviation: DCP
- Leader: Suren Petrosyan
- Founded: 27 February 2021
- Headquarters: Yerevan, Armenia
- Ideology: Conservatism; Economic liberalism
- National Assembly: 0 / 107

Website
- www.dcp.am/

The Democratic Consolidation Party (DCP) (Armenian: Ժողովրդավարական համախմբում կուսակցություն, romanized: Zhoghovrdavarakan hamakhmbum kusakts’ut’yun) is an Armenian political party.

== History ==
The Democratic Consolidation Party was established on 27 February 2021 during a founding congress held in Yerevan. Suren Petrosyan was elected as Chairman of the party. The party traces its roots to 2019, when it was originally established as an initiative tasked with modernizing public administration. However, the initiative declared it would alter into a political party.

The party did not participate in the 2021 Armenian parliamentary election, stating that the threat of war should be a more serious concern to Armenia.

The party participated in the 2023 Yerevan City Council election, nominating Suren Petrosyan as their candidate for Mayor of Yerevan. Following the election, the party failed to gain any seats in the Yerevan City Council, gaining just 1.01% of the vote.

The party has no political representation within the National Assembly and currently acts as an extra-parliamentary force.

== Ideology ==
The party advocates for strengthening the security of Armenia and Artsakh, protecting individual freedoms, and creating a strong and stable state. Following the Second Nagorno-Karabakh War, the party pledged to assist Artsakh in its redevelopment and opened a representative office in Stepanakert. During a working visit to France in March 2023, Suren Petrosyan pledged to unite the Armenian diaspora. The party supports maintaining strong relations with "strategic ally" Russia, while also deepening relations with the European Union and United States.

== See also ==
- Programs of political parties in Armenia
