= Reformist Party (Armenia) =

Reformist Party Ռեֆորմիստների կուսակցություն
- Leader: Vahan Babayan
- Founded: 2016
- Headquarters: Yerevan
- Slogan: "Armenia for you"

The Reformist Party (Armenian: Ռեֆորմիստների կուսակցություն) is an Armenian political party. It was founded in July 2016 by Vahan Babayan.

== History ==
Vahan Babayan was elected Chairman of the Reformist Party during the founding congress in July 2016. Babayan had previously been a member of the Prosperous Armenia party and held a seat in the National Assembly following the 2012 Armenian parliamentary election under Prosperous Armenia's electoral list. On 10 March 2016, Babayan confirmed he was leaving the Prosperous Armenia party.

Babayan announced the intentions for the Reformist Party to participate in the 2017 Armenian parliamentary elections and supported the idea of forming an electoral alliance with the Tsarukyan Alliance. Ultimately however, the party did not participate and officially endorsed Serzh Sargsyan and the Republican Party of Armenia.

The party did participate in the 2018 Yerevan City Council election, but failed to win any seats in the Yerevan City Council, gaining just 0.22% of the popular vote. The party had nominated Artak Avetyan to run for mayoral candidate of Yerevan. Avetyan lost the mayoral race.

During the 2020–2021 Armenian protests, party members held a rally demanding the resignation of Prime Minister Nikol Pashinyan. Vahan Babayan remains skeptical of Pashinyan and actively supports former President Serzh Sargsyan.

In August 2022, the party formed an electoral alliance with the My Powerful Community ahead of municipal elections.

In March 2023, the party participated in local elections in the Ani district of Shirak Province. The party formed an electoral alliance with the Liberal Democratic Union of Armenia known as the "Nation-Community" alliance.

== Ideology ==
The party supports the economic development of Armenia and believes the country can become a transit hub between Europe and Asia through the Belt and Road Initiative. Prior to municipal elections in Yerevan, the party advocated for increasing the budget for public transportation and waste disposal, reducing urban traffic, creating more parking spaces and bicycle lanes, and creating new public parks. The party opposes the legalization of marijuana.

== See also ==
- Programs of political parties in Armenia
