= Voskevan =

Village in Tavush, Armenia

Voskevan Ոսկեվան
- Location within Armenia Location within Tavush
- Coordinates: 41°07′09″N 45°03′55″E
- Country: Armenia
- Province: Tavush
- Municipality: Noyemberyan

Population (2011)
  - Total: 1,256
- Time zone: UTC+4 (AMT)
- Website: voskevan.am

Voskevan (Armenian: Ոսկեվան) is a village in the Noyemberyan Municipality of the Tavush Province of Armenia.
