= Arevik =

Village in Armavir, Armenia

Arevik Արևիկ
- Location within Armenia
- Coordinates: 40°06′02″N 44°05′49″E
- Country: Armenia
- Province: Armavir

Population (2008)
  - Total: 2,427
- Time zone: UTC+4 ( )
  - Summer (DST): UTC+5 ( )

Arevik (Armenian: Արևիկ; formerly, Agdzharkh and Aghja-Arkh) is a village in the Armavir province of Armenia. The name Arevik comes from the root Arev meaning "sun".

== See also ==
- Armavir Province
