= Arevik, Shirak =

Village in Shirak, Armenia

Arevik Արևիկ
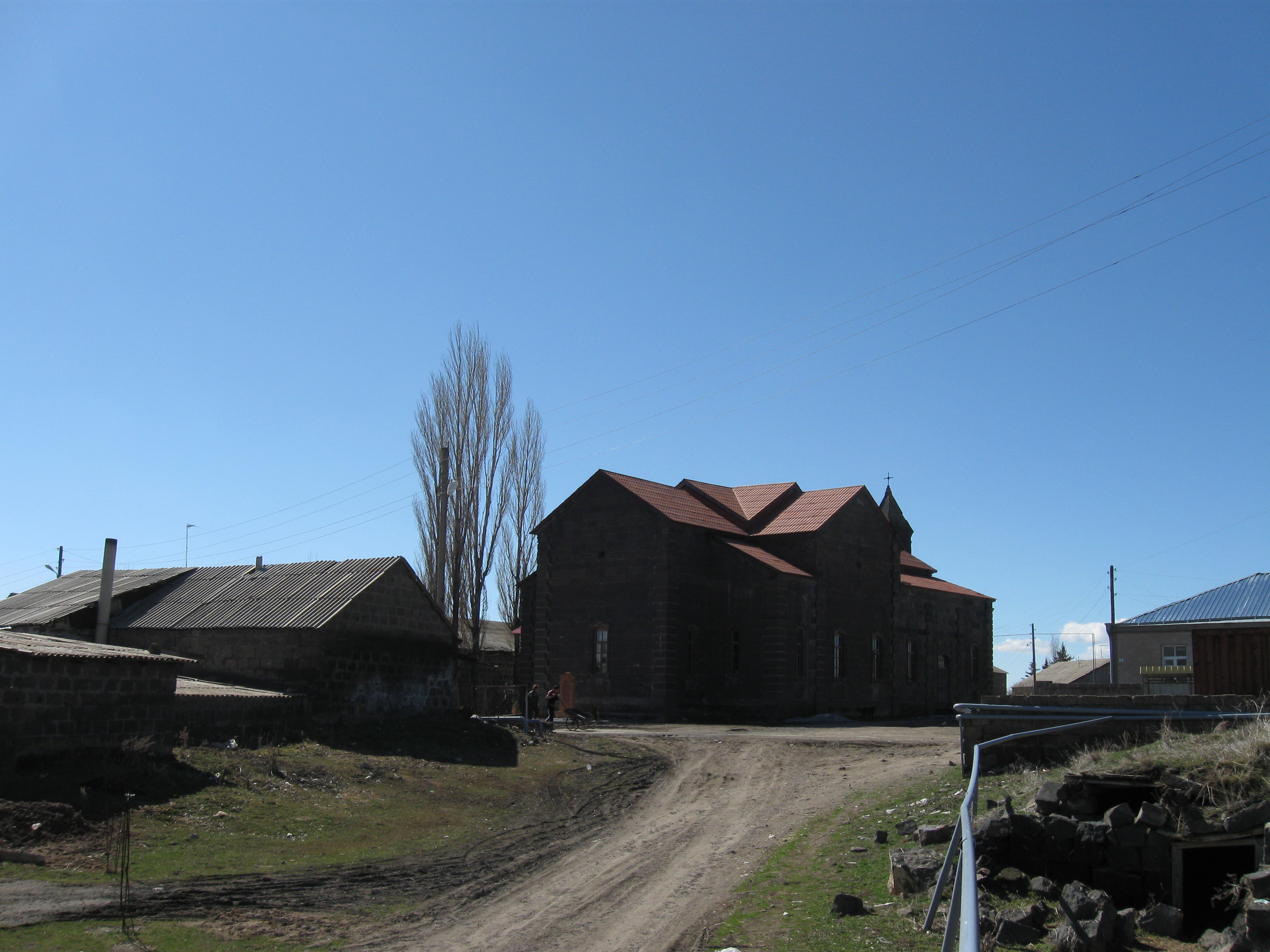

- Location within Armenia Location within Shirak
- Coordinates: 40°44′10″N 43°53′34″E
- Country: Armenia
- Province: Shirak
- Municipality: Akhuryan
- Elevation: 1,530 m (5,020 ft)

Population (2011)
  - Total: 1,566
- Time zone: UTC+4
  - Summer (DST): UTC+5

Arevik (Armenian: Արևիկ) is a village in the Akhuryan Municipality of the Shirak Province of Armenia. The Statistical Committee of Armenia reported its population was 1,781 in 2010, up from 1,749 at the 2001 census.

== History ==
The rural village was established in the 18th century by thousands of Armenian Catholics, who were forced into exile from Constantinople by the Ottoman Empire.

When Armenia was part of the Soviet Union, the village was changed to Arevik as its present name in 1945. From the fall of the Soviet Union in 1991, Arevik has survived as a predominantly Catholic village.

== Demographics ==
Historical population
Year	Pop.	±% p.a.
1831	159	—
1873	625	+3.31%
1914	1,232	+1.67%
1922	1,498	+2.47%
1959	1,489	−0.02%
1970	1,532	+0.26%
1979	1,455	−0.57%
1989	1,908	+2.75%
2001	1,749	−0.72%
2004	1,652	−1.88%
2011	1,566	−0.76%
