= Strong Armenia =

Political party in Armenia

Strong Armenia Ուժեղ Հայաստան
- Leader: Samvel Karapetyan
- Founded: 8 December 2025
- Headquarters: Yerevan, Armenia
- Ideology: Conservatism
- Political position: Big tent
- National Assembly: 29 / 107

Website
- strongarmenia.am

"Strong Armenia" party is an active political party in Armenia, founded on 8 December 2025 under the name "Pro-Armenian". On 16 January 2026, the party was renamed "Strong Armenia". The party was formed on the basis of the "Our Way" movement, initiated by Samvel Karapetyan, a businessman, philanthropist and owner of the Tashir Group.

The Strong Armenia party was registered by Aleksan Aleksanyan, Ashot Farsyan and Lena Matevosyan, members of the "Our Way" movement founded by Samvel Karapetyan. At the congress held on 11 February, Samvel Karapetyan, who is subject to political persecution, was elected party president. In the 2026 Armenian parliamentary election, the Strong Armenia bloc won 23.27% of the vote and 29 of 105 seats, becoming the largest opposition force in the National Assembly.

== Background ==
=== "Our Way" movement ===
On 17 June 2025, a search was carried out at the home of businessman Samvel Karapetyan after he publicly expressed support for Armenian Apostolic Church. In his statement, he had said that "a small group, ignoring Armenian history and the thousand-year heritage of the Armenian Church, has attacked the Church and the Armenian people; if politicians fail to defend the Church, then we will take part in our own way". The following day, 18 June, Samvel Karapetyan was arrested. After the arrest, he was charged under Articles 290 (failure to pay taxes, duties or other payments), 296 (money laundering) and 422 (public calls aimed at seizing power, violating territorial integrity, renouncing sovereignty or violently overthrowing the constitutional order) of the Criminal Code. On 13 October, the charges against Samvel Karapetyan were amended, and a charge under Article 296, Part 3, Points 2 and 3 of the Criminal Code was added (money laundering on a particularly large scale, using official or service powers or the influence arising from them). Since 17 January 2026, Samvel Karapetyan has been under house arrest.

== History ==
On 8 December 2025, this party was founded by businessman Samvel Karapetyan under the name "Pro-Armenian" party, which later changed to "Strong Armenia" on 16 January 2026.

On 19 January 2026, spokesperson Marianna Ghahramanyan announced that the party's organization is in its final stages, and that the party is expected to develop its agenda and vision in the near future.

On 11 February 2026, the party held a congress to elect a new president and council, with Samvel Karapetyan unanimously elected as party chairman. The following day, the party held a presentation at the Karen Demirchyan Complex. During the presentation, the party announced its candidates for the 2026 parliamentary election, where Karapetyan was announced as the party's candidate for prime minister, and that Narek Karapetyan will lead the party list. As Karapetyan also held Russian and Cypriot citizenship, he was constitutionally ineligible to stand for parliament or prime minister. the party said it would seek to change the law after the election.

On 14 April 2026, the Anti-Corruption Committee arrested two party members and accused them of pre-election bribery by paying Armenian residents "under the guise of charity". Then on 16 April, another 14 party members were also arrested on similar charges.

=== Electoral history ===
The party contested the 2026 Armenian parliamentary election on 7 June 2026 as the Strong Armenia bloc, with Samvel Karapetyan as its candidate for prime minister. According to the final results announced by the Central Electoral Commission on 14 June, the bloc received 340,006 votes (23.27%), finishing second behind Civil Contract and becoming the largest opposition force in the National Assembly with 29 of 105 seats, including one seat reserved for an Assyrian minority representative. Strong Armenia, together with five other opposition forces, issued a joint statement rejecting the published results as unable to form the basis of legitimate authority, and its supporters protested outside the commission building as the results were announced.

Despite rejecting the results, the bloc announced that it would take up its mandates and work in parliament, with Narek Karapetyan arguing that since Civil Contract had not won a constitutional majority, the opposition would be able to block a number of decisions. The Central Electoral Commission handed mandates to the elected deputies on 21 July 2026, ahead of the first session of the ninth convocation on 2 August. The following day, the commission consented to the Prosecutor General's request to bring criminal charges against Narek Karapetyan, but rejected the request to arrest him.

== Platform ==
The party's platform will focus on the protecting businesses from being targeted for their political views, most notably against party leader Samvel Karapetyan. The party is critical of the "poor leadership" that led to the defeat of Artsakh in the 2020 Karabakh war, and supports more investment in national defense.

The party calls for ensuring the protection of Armenia's independence without submitting to economic and cultural coercion from Turkey. The party also supports closer ties with Russia to avoid turning Armenia into "an arena of geopolitical confrontation". Key individual members of the party also proposed to create a Ministry of Sex to fight the alleged sexual frustration of women in Armenia.
