= National Assembly (Armenia) =

Unicameral legislature of Armenia

National Assembly Ազգային ժողով
- 9th convocation of the National Assembly
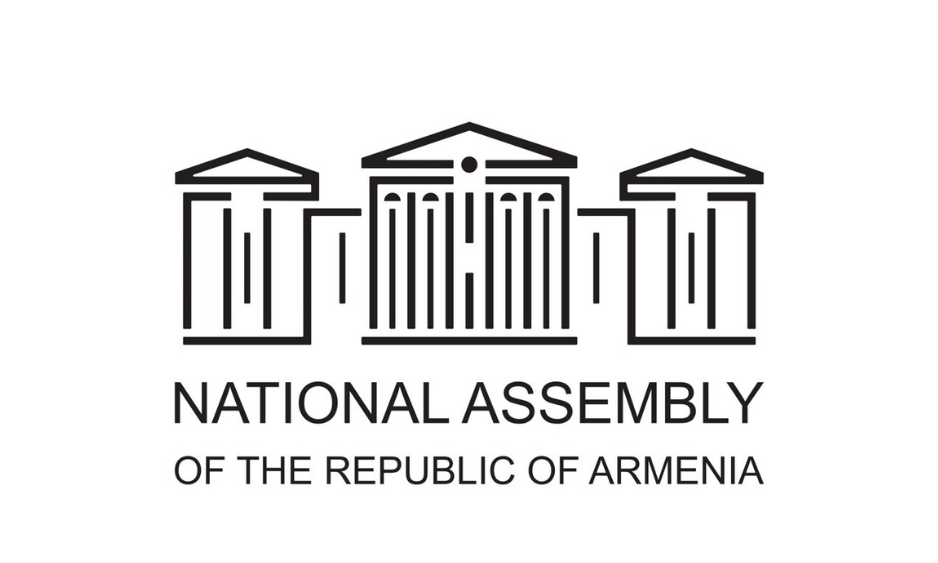

Type
- Type: Unicameral

History
- Founded: 1 August 1918, reestablished 5 July 1995
- Preceded by: Supreme Council of the Republic of Armenia

Leadership
- President: Ruben Rubinyan, Civil Contract since 3 August 2026

Structure
- Seats: 105
- Political groups: Government (64): Civil Contract (64); Independent (2); Opposition (41): Strong Armenia (29); Independent (1); Country of Living (1); New Age (1); Armenia Alliance (12); Independent (6); ARF (5); Forward Party (1)
- Length of term: 5 years

Elections
- Voting system: Two-round majority-minority jackpot system with a 4% threshold for parties and a 8% / 10% threshold for alliances
- First election: 21 and 23 June 1919 5 July 1995 (reestablished)
- Last election: 7 June 2026

Meeting place
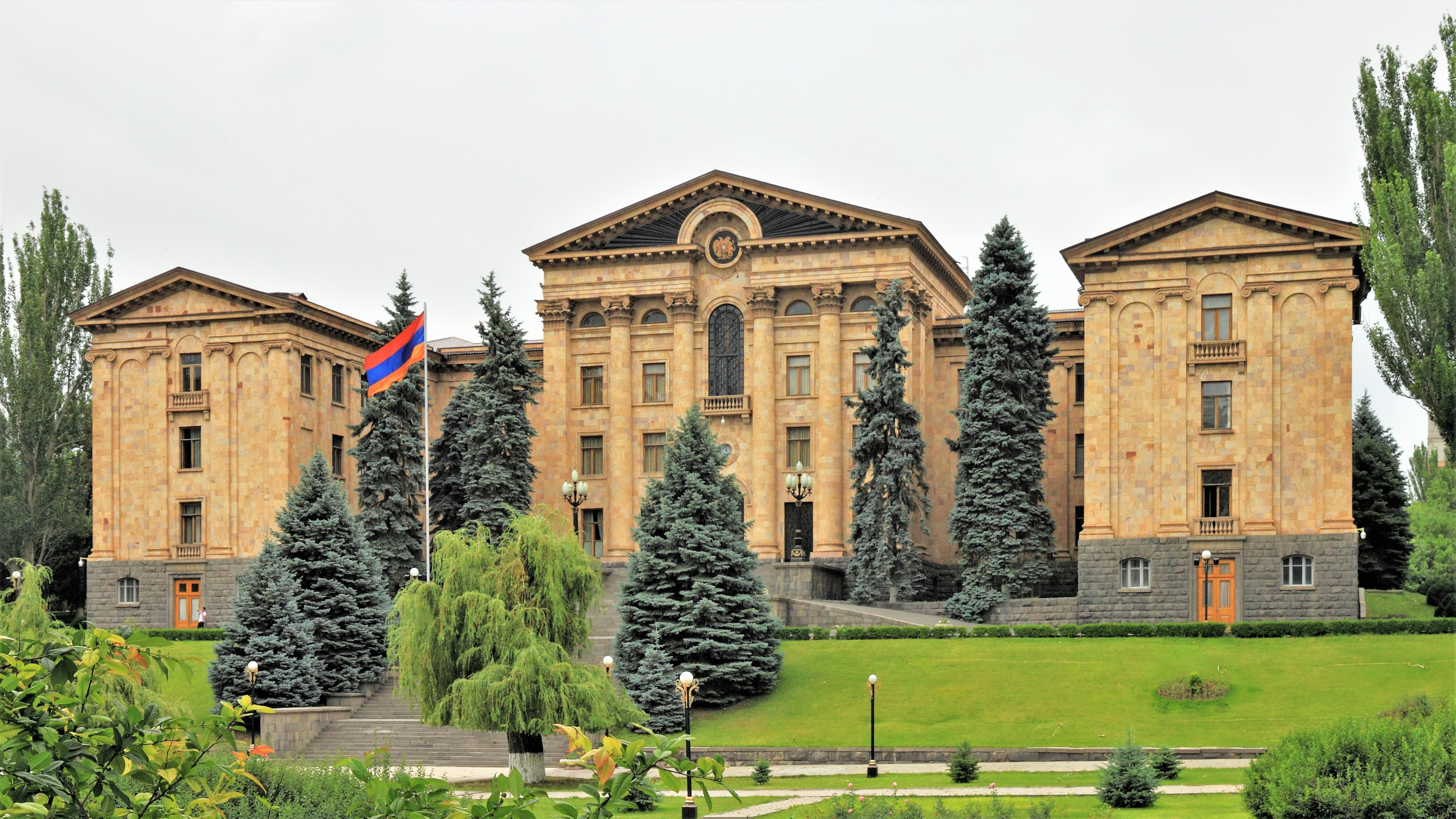
- National Assembly Building; 19 Baghramyan Avenue; Yerevan, 0095; Armenia; 40°11′23″N 44°30′33″E

Website
- National Assembly of Armenia

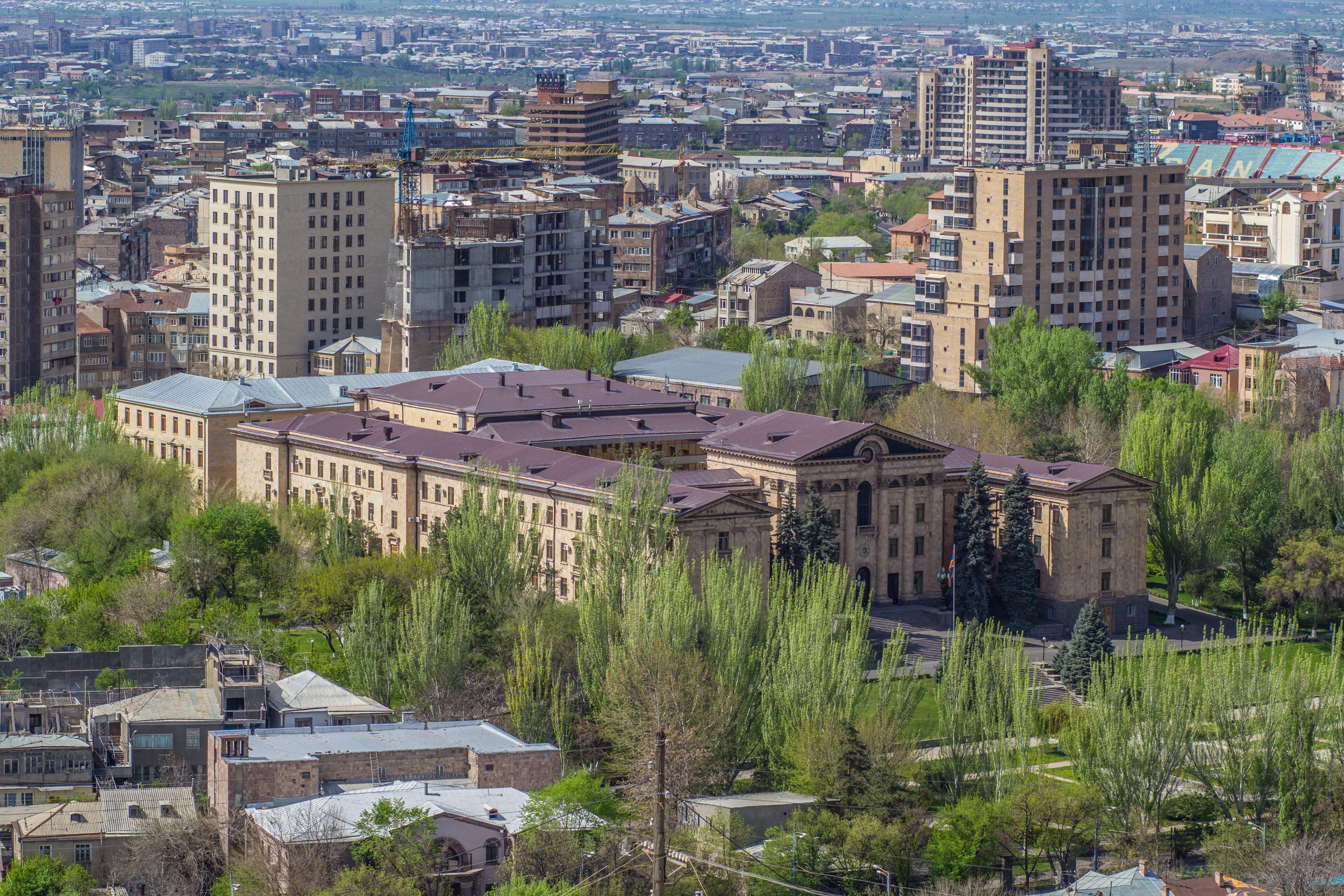
Aerial view of the building and premises

The National Assembly of Armenia (Armenian: Հայաստանի Հանրապետության Ազգային ժողով, Hayastani Hanrapetyut'yan Azgayin zhoghov or simply Ազգային ժողով, ԱԺ, Azgayin Zhoghov, AZh), also informally referred to as the Parliament of Armenia (խորհրդարան, khorhrdaran), is the legislative branch of the government of Armenia.

== Overview ==
The National Assembly was originally established in 1918 as the Khorhurd (Armenian: Խորհուրդ) by the Armenian National Council following their declaration of independence. Acting as the nation's provisional legislative body, the Armenian National Council tripled its membership, forming an interim coalition government composed of Dashnaks and Populists.

Following the Armenian parliamentary elections of 1919, the National Assembly's membership increased again up to 80 deputies including several minority representatives. The Khorhurd continued to function with an overwhelming Dashnak majority through four Prime Ministers in the span of two years, until the Sovietisation of Armenia in 1920.

From 1938, the National Assembly of the Armenian Soviet Socialist Republic was referred to as the Supreme Council of Armenia. Following the collapse of the Soviet Union in 1991 and the adoption of the new Constitution of Armenia in 1995, the formation of the current National Assembly was established.

The National Assembly is a unicameral body. The National Assembly consists of at least 101 seats, but with additional seats allocated, it may grow and reach to about 200 seats in extremely rare cases. The President of the National Assembly is Ruben Rubinyan.

== Electoral system ==
After electoral system amendments introduced in April 2021 members of parliament are elected only through closed party lists by party list proportional representation method.

Four mandates are reserved for national minorities, provided they are included in corresponding section of party lists. Any top segment of a party list can not include over 70% of representatives of the same sex.

Parties need to pass 4% of votes and alliances (blocs) of two or three parties 8%. Alliances of four or more parties need 10% threshold respectively to be included in mandate distribution.

By law, parliament must have at least 3 political forces present, even if one or more of them did not pass the electoral threshold. In this case, the sheer percentage decides which party enters parliament, regardless of whether it is a party or a bloc.

If neither party wins over 50% of mandates in the first round and no coalition with sufficient mandates is established within 6 days after the election results announcement a second round of elections will be carried out on 28th day of the first round voting. Two best-performing political forces are allowed to participate in the second round. All mandates received as per first round will be preserved. The party (or a newly formed coalition) which wins second round of elections will be given additional number of mandates to reach 54% of all seats (provided the newly formed coalition does not already have over 54% of mandates from the results of the first round).

If any party or bloc wins over 2/3 of mandates sufficient additional mandates are distributed among all other political forces represented in the parliament to ensure that at least 1/3 of all seats are held by forces other than the winning one.

Since the requirement of assignment of 1/3 of all mandates to non-ruling parties is stipulated by the Constitution some argue, that when withdrawal of oppositional MPs leads to violation of that rule the ruling party shall be forced to call new snap elections. This is however not a consensus opinion and probably shall be dealt with in Constitutional Court.

Historically, significant share of cast votes (1995: 12.8%, 1999: 18.6%, 2003: 24.0%, 2007: 24.7%, 2012: 1.6%, 2017: 9.1%, 2018: 14.9%, 2021: 19.8%, 2026: 16.8%) fell below election threshold and was disregarded in mandate distribution.

== Representatives ==
=== Speakers of the Parliament of the First Republic of Armenia (1918–1920) ===
- Avetik Sahakyan 1 August 1918 – 1 August 1919
- Avetis Aharonyan 1 August 1919 – 4 November 1920
- Hovhannes Kajaznuni 4 November 1920 – 2 December 1920

=== Chairmen of the Supreme Council (1990–1995) ===
- Levon Ter-Petrosyan 4 August 1990 – 11 November 1991
- Babken Ararktsyan 24 December 1991 – 27 July 1995

=== Presidents of the National Assembly (1995–) ===
- Babken Ararktsyan 27 July 1995 – 4 February 1998
- Khosrov Harutyunyan 4 February 1998 – 11 June 1999
- Karen Demirchyan 11 June 1999 – 27 October 1999 (assassinated in 1999)
- Armen Khachatryan 2 November 1999 – 12 June 2003
- Artur Baghdasaryan 12 June 2003 – 1 June 2006
- Tigran Torosyan 1 June 2006 – 26 September 2008
- Hrayr Karapetyan (acting) 26 September 2008 – 29 September 2008
- Hovik Abrahamyan 28 September 2008 – 21 November 2011
- Samvel Nikoyan 6 December 2011 – 31 May 2012
- Hovik Abrahamyan 31 May 2012 – 13 April 2014
- Galust Sahakyan 29 April 2014 – 18 May 2017
- Ara Babloyan 18 May 2017 – 14 January 2019
- Ararat Mirzoyan 14 January 2019 – 2 August 2021
- Alen Simonyan 2 August 2021 – 3 August 2026
- Ruben Rubinyan 3 August 2026 – present

=== Vice-Presidents of the National Assembly ===
- Babken Ararktsyan 1990–1991
- Gagik Harutyunyan 1990–1991
- Ara Sahakian 1991–1998
- Artashes Tumanyan 1991–1995
- Karapet Rubinyan 1995–1998
- Albert Bazeyan 1998–1999
- Yuri Bakhshyan 1998–1999 (assassinated in 1999)
- Ruben Miroyan 1999 (assassinated in 1999)
- Gagik Aslanian 1999–2003
- Tigran Torosyan 1999–2006
- Vahan Hovhannisyan 2003–2008
- Ishkhan Zakarian 2007
- Arevik Petrosyan 2007–2010
- Hrayr Karapetyan 2008–2009
- Samvel Nikoyan 2009–2012
- Samvel Balasanyan 2010–2012
- Hermine Naghdalyan 2012–2017
- Eduard Sharmazanov 2011–2019
- Arpine Hovhannisyan 2017–2019
- Mikayel Melkumyan 2017–2019
- Alen Simonyan 2019–2021
- Lena Nazaryan 2019–2021
- Vahe Enfiajyan 2019–2021
- Ruben Rubinyan 2021–2026
- Hakob Arshakyan 2021–2026
- Hayk Konjoryan 2026–present
- Vahagn Alexanyan 2026–present

== Historical composition ==
Soviet Comm. / Arm. Comm. / Unity Bloc (People's & Republican) / ARF / Shamiram / Nat. Dem. / Orinats Yerkir / Pan-Armenian / Independent / Others / Vacant		Total; Seats
1990	136 / 59 / 64	259
1995	10 / 8 / 5 / 88 / 7 / 72	190
1999	10 / 62 / 8 / 6 / 6 / 7 / 32	131

ARF / Republican / Prosperous Armenia / Tsarukyan / Nat. Unity / Indep. / United Labour / Justice / ANC / Way Out / Orinats Yerkir / Heritage / Others		Total; Seats
2003	11 / 33 / 9 / 37 / 6 / 14 / 19 / 2	131
2007	16 / 59 / 25 / 13 / 10 / 7 / 1	131
2012	5 / 62 / 35 / 8 / 7 / 6 / 5 / 3	131
2017	7 / 58 / 31 / 9	105

Prosperous Armenia / My Step / Bright Armenia		Total; Seats
2018	26 / 88 / 18	132

Armenia Alliance / I Have Honor / Strong Armenia / Indep. / Civil Contract		Total; Seats
2021	29 / 7 / 71	107
2026	12 / 29 / 64	105

== Latest election ==
According to official data published by the CEC, the total number of citizens eligible to vote was 2,489,031. The agency also published a list of observers. Voter turnout was 58.97%. According to the CEC, turnout through the regions was higher the closer to the eastern border: According to exit polls Civil Contract was projected to win with 56.7% followed in second place by Strong Armenia at 17.5%. Pashinyan declared victory at ~2:49am on June 8.

Preliminary results revealed that Civil Contract won 49.8% of all votes, enough to secure a parliamentary majority. However, the ruling party fell short of the two-thirds majority needed to call a constitutional referendum demanded by Azerbaijan as part of a peace deal and also by Turkey to restart border trade. Opposition alliances Strong Armenia and Armenia Alliance won 23.2% and 9.9% of the vote respectively. A fourth party, Prosperous Armenia, had initially looked set to enter parliament but a later tally of electronic votes put the party just under the 4% threshold. The question of Prosperous Armenia's entry into the National Assembly of Armenia and the formation of a faction remained uncertain, until the Election Commission announced that Prosperous Armenia did not enter into the Parliament.

Party	Votes	%	Seats	+/–
Civil Contract	726,819	49.89	64	−7
Strong Armenia	340,006	23.34	29	New
Armenia Alliance	144,983	9.95	12	−17
Prosperous Armenia	58,287	4.00	0	0
Wings of Unity	33,537	2.30	0	New
Meritocratic Party of Armenia	30,642	2.10	0	New
Democracy Law Discipline Party	25,758	1.77	0	New
New Power	25,551	1.75	0	New
"Against All" Democratic Party	21,181	1.45	0	New
Hanrapetutyun Party	15,808	1.09	0	0
Bright Armenia	7,439	0.51	0	0
For The Republic Party	6,754	0.46	0	New
National Democratic Alliance	5,481	0.38	0	0
Democratic Consolidation Party	5,269	0.36	0	0
Armenian National Congress	3,143	0.22	0	New
Christian Democratic Party	2,671	0.18	0	New
Kochari National Revival and National Awakening Party	1,986	0.14	0	New
Reformist Party	1,425	0.10	0	New
Total	1,456,740	100.00	105	–2
Valid votes	1,456,740	98.90		
Invalid/blank votes	16,210	1.10		
Total votes	1,472,950	100.00		
Registered voters/turnout	2,506,826	58.76		
Source: Central Electoral Commission (Votes); Central Electoral Commission (Seats)

== Committees ==
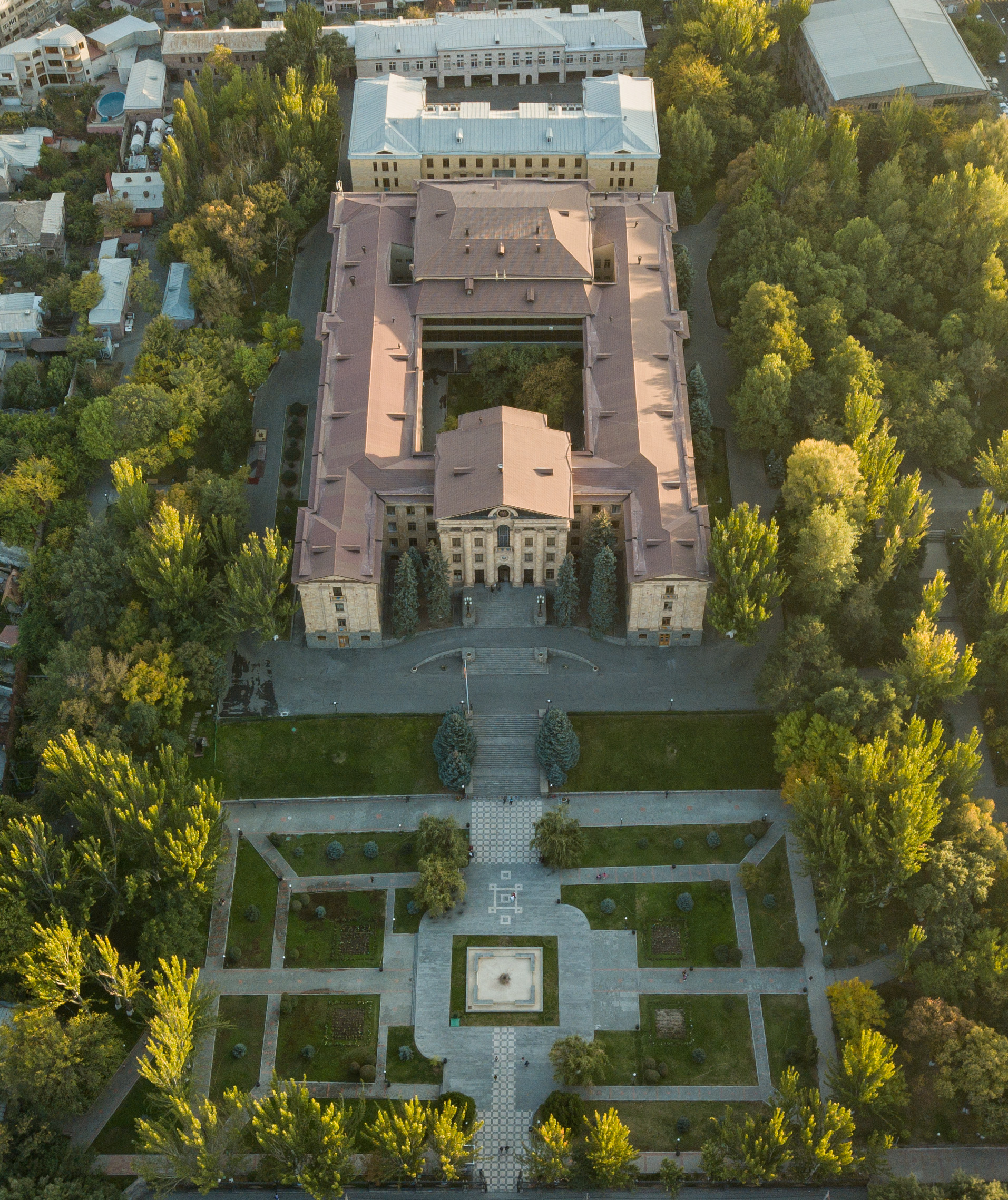
Birds eye view of National Assembly building

=== Standing Committees ===
The National Assembly has eleven standing committees:

- Standing Committee on Defense and Security
- Standing Committee on Economic Affairs
- Standing Committee on European Integration
- Standing Committee on Financial and Budgeting Affairs
- Standing Committee on Foreign Relations
- Standing Committee on Health Care and Social Affairs
- Standing Committee on Human Rights and Public Affairs
- Standing Committee on Science, Education, Culture, Diaspora, Youth and Sport
- Standing Committee on State and Legal Affairs
- Standing Committee on Territorial Administration, Local Self-Government, Agriculture and Environment
- Standing Committee on Territorial Integration

=== Changes according to the Constitutional Reform of 2015 ===
According to the new constitution of Armenia (2015 Constitutional Reforms), the functions of committees previously defined as ad hoc committees are divided into temporary and inquiry committees. As stated in article 107 of the new Constitution, temporary committees may be developed only by the decision of the National Assembly to discuss certain draft laws and acts of the National Assembly and present views or statements connected to the National Assembly.

Article 108 is about the inquiry committees of the National Assembly.

1. The inquiry committee should be formed if at least the twenty-five percent of the total number of parliamentarians present the demand, in order to acquaint facts of public interests to the National Assembly.

2. The National Assembly regulates the number of members of an inquiry committee. The places of the inquiry committees should be proportional to the number of faction's members. The chair of the committee should be the member of the parliament who presented a request.

3. If minimum one-quarter of an inquiry committee demands; state, local self-government bodies and officials are compelled to introduce to the committee required information regarding its remit, if the information is not classified as secrets protected by law.

All the other regulations concerning temporary and inquiry committee should be established by the Law on Rules of Procedure of the National Assembly.

=== Concerns relating to the ad hoc committees and the international experience ===
According to the latest Constitutional Reforms Armenia will have a parliamentary state governance system. This means that compared to the semi-presidential system the powers of the Parliament will be enhanced, an example of this is the right of oversight of the executive power of the republic which is and will be exercised by the Government (as of article 85 of the current and article 145 the new Constitutions). So, the Parliament will have more powers and functions; therefore, it needs more tools to exercise these powers and perform its functions. An inquiry committee is a great tool for the parliament to exercise oversight and that is why according to articles 107 and 108 of the new Constitution there is a differentiation between temporary and inquiry committees.

However, in late 2015, there was a concern relating to the powers of these committees as prescribed by the article 108 of the new Constitution. Edmon Marukyan, the only non-party Deputy of the National Assembly of Armenia, suggested an addendum to the point 3 of article 108. According to him, the addendum should prescribe that the inquiry committees should be empowered to demand state and local self-government body officials to be present in the sittings of the committees and provide relevant explanations. The improvement was suggested for the first time on 11 September 2015, during the session of the Standing Committee on State and Legal Affairs of the National Assembly. By then, the suggestion received a positive feedback and the committee members stated that it could be approved on the constitutional level. However, the decision on the official proposal to the National Assembly was to include the addendum in the rules of procedure of the NA rather than in the Constitution.

The international experience shows that giving such powers to inquiry committees is a common thing. Point 7 of rule 176 of the Rules of Procedure of the European Parliament states that "A committee of inquiry may contact the institutions or persons referred to in Article 3 of the Decision referred to in paragraph 2 with a view to holding a hearing or obtaining documents." Even though it was prescribed neither by the Constitution nor the Rules of Procedure of the National Assembly that temporary committees have the power to hold a hearing with the presence of state and local self-government body officials, there was such a case when the committee held a closed-door hearing. On 23 October 2008 with the order of the President of Armenia, a temporary committee of experts was formed on obtaining facts and evidence on the incidents of 1 March 2008. So as to gain the necessary information the committee was given the tools typical to a real parliamentarian inquiry committee.

=== Ad hoc committees as prescribed by the Constitution and Laws ===
Ad hoc committees are special temporary committees established by the decision of the National Assembly to discuss certain draft laws, or investigate certain issues, events or facts and to submit conclusions to the National Assembly. The aim of these committees is to draw attention to exceptional cases that are not covered by the standing committees.

According to the Constitution of Armenia, Article 73 "If appropriate, interim committees may be established as prescribed by the law on the Rules of Procedure of the National Assembly for preliminary discussion of certain draft laws or for submitting to the National Assembly opinions, statements on certain issues, events and facts". Following the consideration and definition in the Constitution the Law on Rules of Procedure of the National Assembly clearly defines all the issues concerning the add hoc committees. More particularly, according to the article 22 of the mentioned law, add hoc committees are created by the decision of the National Assembly. The decision should contain information relating to the tasks, terms and procedures of an add hoc committee, meaning that the committee should operate only in very strict limitations set to the spheres of its investigation, the resources it may gain access to and also to the timeframes. The ultimate reason for existence of such committees is to deliver a report on its finding during a session of the National Assembly. Based on these reports, the Deputy may create a draft resolution in 2 days and if agreed by the Lead Committee, the resolution may be included in the draft agenda for upcoming four-day session.

=== Ad hoc committees: their goals, procedures, and results ===
==== Committee on Ethics ====
One of the current add hoc committees of the National Assembly of Armenia is the Committee on Ethics. This is not a classical add hoc committee as it does exist during every session of the National Assembly but the committee functions till the beginning of the successive session when a new committee is formed.

According to the Article 24.1 of the Law of the Republic of Armenia on the Rules of Procedure of the National Assembly, each faction has the right to nominate at least 1 Deputy to the ethics committee. The chairperson of the committee and the vice-chairperson are appointed from the members of the committee by the nomination of faction, although the Chairperson of the National Assembly is the one to appoint the chairperson of the ethics committee, the vice chairperson, and to approve other members. If the chairperson of the ethics committee is from a non-opposition faction, the vice chairperson should be from the opposition faction and the vice versa. Factions have the right to change their representative in the ethics committee.

According to the Article 24.2 of the Law of the Republic of Armenia on the Rules of Procedure of the National Assembly the ethics committee provides conclusion to the National Assembly on violation by a Deputy of the requirements not to be engaged in entrepreneurial activities, not to hold offices in state or commercial organizations, and not to perform other paid work except for scientific, pedagogical or creative work (1st Paragraph of the Article 65 of the Constitution). The committee also decides if there was a violation of 2nd Paragraph of the Article 6.1 of the mentioned law i.e. the very basic requirements to abide the laws, to respect moral norms of the society, to be respectful to the colleagues, not to be guided by personal interests and so on, provides a Deputy with conclusion if his/her job is scientific, pedagogical or creative and more. The Committee on Ethics can require and obtain materials and documents relevant to the issues examined by the committee from any state agency; it can also demand to the state agencies with the exception of courts, judges and prosecutors to carry out checks, studies and expert examinations on the issues examined in the committee. The members of the ethics committee are free to enter any state institution or to examine any document relating to the case.

Any individual can apply to the committee on ethics in cases prescribed by the law. The applicant should submit a written application with all the relevant documents. By proposal of the chairperson of the ethics committee but no later than ten days the committee starts the examination of the issue raised in the application or rejects its examination. The committee on ethics finishes its examination of the issue in 30 days after starting an examination; it may also extend the deadline by 20 days in case of necessity to implement a deeper research.

The sittings of the committee are closed except of cases when the Deputy in the application suggests holding an open sitting. Sitting of the committee is valid if at least half of the members are present, and the sitting is held by the chairperson of the committee, the vice chairperson, or another member according to the prescriptions of the law. Member of the committee assigned for the examination of the issue is the main reporter and the Deputy indicated in the application is the supplementary reporter. The decisions and conclusions of the committee are adopted by the majority of votes if more than half of the members participated in the voting. The content of the application and name of the Deputy indicated in the application are not publicly available until the adoption of the final decision. The members of the ethics committee and other people participating in the activities of the committee cannot publicize details of the examination.

One of the recent cases in this committee was an application indicating names of several Deputies and reporting that they voted instead for other Deputies during the voting. After examining the application, listening to the committee member appointed for the case and to the accused Deputies the committee on ethics found them guilty of violating the duty to abide the laws. Also, in order to eliminate this kind of issues in the future, the committee made a suggestion to make supplements and changes in the Law of the Republic of Armenia on the Rules of Procedure of the National Assembly more specifically consider voting instead for other Deputies disturbance of the order and enforce the presiding officer to take immediate disciplinary measures against these Deputies that is depriving the Deputy from the right to be present during the session of the National Assembly. The National Assembly approved this suggestion.

==== Ad hoc Committee on Studying the Activity of the Gas Supply System in Armenia ====
This committee was established in February 2014 to examine the protection level of natural gas consumers' interests (calories of supplied gas, testing gas usage counters, argumentations for the loss), examine the lawfulness of the accumulation of debt for natural gas during 2011–2013 and reasonableness of the amount of debt, to make predictions about the possibilities of alternative gas importers and other thoroughly listed issues relating to the gas supply system in Armenia as a whole including examination of prices for the gas and international practices.

The committee hold closed sittings, the decisions and conclusions were adopted by the majority of votes, the committee had the right to require and obtain materials and documents relevant to the issues examined by the committee from any state agency; it can also demand to the state agencies with the exception of courts, judges and prosecutors to carry out checks, studies and expert examinations on the issues examined in the committee and so on. The committee presented its findings and conclusion during the session of the National Assembly of 7 April 2015.

== International cooperation ==
The National Assembly of Armenia maintains various cooperation agreements with national parliaments around the world including the Parliament of Georgia, the National Assembly of France, the Parliament of Egypt, the Federal Assembly of Russia, the Supreme Council of Kyrgyzstan, the People's Assembly of Syria, and the Parliament of Lebanon.

The National Assembly of Armenia also holds membership in various international parliamentary organizations including the NATO Parliamentary Assembly, the EU-Armenia Parliamentary Partnership Committee, the Interparliamentary Assembly on Orthodoxy, the Inter-Parliamentary Union, the Parliamentary Assembly of the Organization of the Black Sea Economic Cooperation, the Parliamentary Assembly of the Collective Security Treaty Organization, the Parliamentary Assembly of the Council of Europe, the Euronest Parliamentary Assembly, the Assemblée parlementaire de la Francophonie, the Parliamentary Assembly of the Organization for Security and Co-operation in Europe, the CIS Interparliamentary Assembly, and holds observer member status in the ASEAN Inter-Parliamentary Assembly.

== See also ==
- Elections in Armenia
- List of legislatures by country
- List of political parties in Armenia
- National Assembly of Artsakh
- Politics of Armenia
- President of the National Assembly of Armenia
- Programs of political parties in Armenia
