= List of ministers of internal affairs of Armenia =

This is a list of chiefs of the Police of Armenia.

== First Republic (1918–1920) ==
=== Minister of Internal Affairs of the First Republic of Armenia (1918–1920) ===
- Aram Manukian (July 1918 – January 1919)
- Alexander Khatisian (February 1919 – August 1919)
- Abraham Gyulkhandanyan (August 1919 – May 1920)
- Ruben Ter-Minasian (May 1920 – September 1920)
- Sargis Araratyan (September 1920 – November 1920)
- Simon Vratsian (November 1920 – December 1920)

== Armenian SSR (1920-1991) ==
=== People's Commissar of Interior Affairs of the Armenian SSR (1920–1941) ===
- Isahak Dovlatyan (December 1921 – April 1921)
- Poghos Makintsyan (April 1921 – July 1921)
- Avis Nourijanyan (July 1921 – August 1921)
- Shavarsh Amirkhanyan (August 1921 – May 1924)
- Hovhannes Dourgaryan (May 1924 – July 1927)
- Sergey Melik-Hovsepyan (July 1927 – December 1928)
- Sedrak Margaryan (February 1929 – November, 1929)
- Hayk Petrosyan (November 1929 – May 1930)
- Sedrak Otyan (May 1930 – October 1930)
- Armenak Aboulyan (December 1930 – July, 1934)
- Khachik Moughdousi (July 1934 – September, 1937)
- Victor Khvorostov (November 1937 – March 1939)
- Aleksey Korotkov (March 1939 – March 1941)

=== Minister of Internal Affairs of the Armenian SSR (1941–1991) ===
- Georgi Martirosov (March 1941 – May 1943, March 1953 – April 1954)
- Ivan Matevosov (May 1943 – August 1947)
- Khoren Grigoryan (August 1947 – March 1953)
- Pyotr Piskunov (April 1954 – August 1957)
- Hayk Melkonyan (August 1957 – August 1961)
- Sergey Arzoumanyan (August 1961 – December 1968)
- Vladimir Darbinyan (December 1968 – September 1974)
- Yevgeniy Patalov (December 1974 – November 1983)
- Haykaz Shahinyan (November 1983 – June 1988)
- Housik Haroutunyan (June 1988 – May 1990)
- Levon Galstyan (June 1990 – 1990 August)
- Karlos Ghazaryan (August 1990 – March 1991)

== Republic of Armenia (since 1991) ==
=== Minister of Internal Affairs of the Republic of Armenia (1991-2003;2023) ===
- Ashot Manucharyan (March 1991 – December 1991)
- Valeri Poghosyan (December 1991 – February 1992)
- Vano Siradeghyan (February 1992 – November 1996)
- Serzh Sargsyan (November 1996 – June 1999)
- Suren Abrahamyan (June 1999 – November 1999)
- Hayk Haroutyunyan (November 1999 – January 2003)
- Vahe Ghazaryan (2023)

=== Chief of Police of the Republic of Armenia (2003-present) ===
- Hayk Haroutyunyan (January 2003 – May 29, 2008)
- Alik Sargsyan (May 29, 2008 – November 1, 2011)
- Vladimir Gasparyan (November 1, 2011 – May 10, 2018)
- Valeri Osipyan (May 10, 2018 – September 19, 2019)
- Arman Sargsyan (September 19, 2019 - June 8, 2020)
- Vahe Ghazaryan (June 8, 2020 – January 9, 2023)
- Aram Hovhannisyan (January 9, 2023 – June 2, 2025)
