= 1991 Armenian presidential election =

17 October 1991	1996 →
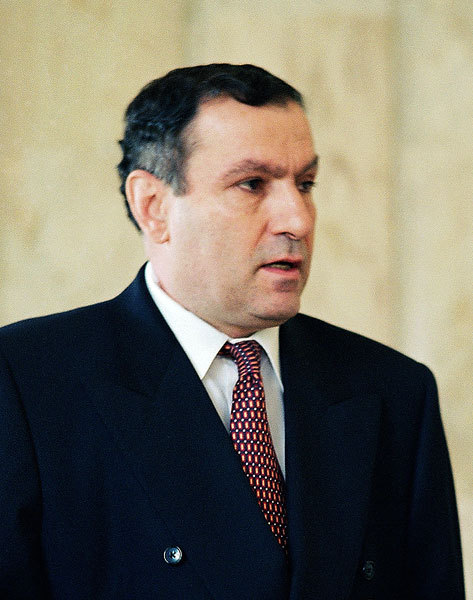

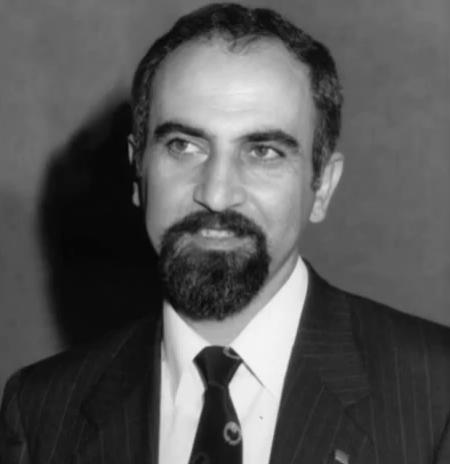
Nominee	Levon Ter-Petrosyan	Paruyr Hayrikyan
Party	HHSh	UNSD
Percentage	83.0%	7.2%
Elected President
Levon Ter-Petrosyan
HHSh

Presidential elections were held in Armenia for the first time on 17 October 1991. The result was a victory for Levon Ter-Petrosyan, who won 83% of the vote. Turnout was 70%.

== Results ==
Zori Balayan withdrew before election day but remained on the ballot.

Candidate	Party	Votes	%
Levon Ter-Petrosyan	Pan-Armenian National Movement		83.0
Paruyr Hayrikyan	Union for National Self-Determination		7.2
Sos Sargsyan	Armenian Revolutionary Federation		4.3
Ashot Navasardyan	Republican Party of Armenia		
Rafael Ghazaryan	Independent		
Zori Balayan	Independent		
Against all			
Total			
Total votes		1,260,433	–
Registered voters/turnout			70
Source: Nohlen et al.
