= Vano Siradeghyan =

Armenian politician and writer (1946–2021)

- Վանո Սիրադեղյան

Mayor of Yerevan
- In office November 14, 1996 – February 2, 1998
- Preceded by: Ashot Mirzoyan
- Succeeded by: Suren Abrahamyan

Minister of Internal Affairs
- In office February 10, 1992 – November 8, 1996
- President: Levon Ter-Petrosyan
- Preceded by: Valeri Poghosyan
- Succeeded by: Serzh Sargsyan

Personal details
- Born: November 13, 1946 Koti, Armenian SSR, Soviet Union (today Koti, Armenia)
- Died: October 15, 2021 (aged 74)
- Party: Pan-Armenian National Movement
- Education: Yerevan State University
- Occupation: Politician, writer

External media

Images
- Vano Siradeghyan

Video
- Siradeghyan talks about the 1996 election on YouTube
- Siradeghyan's last interview on YouTube

Vano Smbati Siradeghyan (Armenian: Վանո Սմբատի Սիրադեղյան; November 13, 1946 – October 15, 2021) was an Armenian politician and writer. He held several high-ranked positions in the 1990s. He served as Minister of Internal Affairs from 1992 and 1996 and as Mayor of Yerevan from 1996 to 1998. After President Levon Ter-Petrosyan's resignation in February 1998, criminal charges were filed against Siradeghyan. He disappeared in April 2000 and was wanted by Interpol until his death in 2021 at the age of 74.

== Early years ==
Siradeghyan was born on November 13, 1946, in the village of Koti (formerly called Shavarshavan) in northeastern Armenia, near the Azerbaijani border. From 1966 to 1969, he served in the Soviet Army. He graduated from Yerevan State University in 1974. In 1983 he published his first book titled Kiraki (Sunday).

== Political career ==
In 1988, Siradeghyan became one of the main members of the Karabakh Committee, which demanded that the Soviet authorities transfer the Armenian-populated Nagorno-Karabakh Autonomous Oblast of the Azerbaijan SSR to the Armenian SSR. In December 1989, Siradeghyan and other leading members of the Karabakh Committee were arrested, but were freed in May 1990. The Pan-Armenian National Movement was founded by members of the Karabakh Committee the same year.

Siradeghyan was appointed the Minister of Interior Affairs in 1992 by President Levon Ter-Petrosyan, a post he held until 1996. In this role, he addressed the issue of making the old KGB subordinate to the new government. According to journalist David Petrosyan, Siradeghyan "controlled part of the local market in oil products, part of the incomes generated from transport junctions, the greater part of the food market, the smaller part of bread production, and the woodwork and timber industry."

Siradeghyan was criticized for his harshness against political opposition. In 1994, Ashot Manucharyan, Siradeghyan's former colleague from the Karabakh Committee, accused him of "subverting democracy and fueling corruption", while another former Karabakh Committee member, Hambartsum Galstyan, claimed that Siradeghyan was responsible for 30 politically motivated murders. Galstyan was killed by unknown assailants in December 1994, which was followed by speculation that Siradeghyan had ordered the killing. He also played a key role in the forcible crackdown against Vazgen Manukyan's supporters' protests after the controversial 1996 presidential election. In an interview in January 1999, Siradeghyan admitted that the government had resorted to vote-rigging to secure Ter-Petrosyan's victory without a runoff election and stated that after the crackdown, President Ter-Petrosyan fell into a three-month depression and wanted Siradeghyan and Defense Minister Vazgen Sargsyan to resign. According to Siradeghyan, "the whole state apparatus was demoralized, paralyzed and no government was formed during [the ensuing] three months."

In November 1996, Siradeghyan resigned from his position at the Interior Ministry. On November 14, 1996, he was appointed Mayor of Yerevan by presidential decree. In July 1997, Siradeghyan was elected head of the Pan-Armenian National Movement's executive body. He was a member of the National Assembly of Armenia from 1997 to 1999.

== Charges and arrests ==
On February 1, 1998, Siradeghyan resigned from his position as Mayor of Yerevan. Two days later, on February 3, 1998, President Levon Ter-Petrosyan resigned as a result of disagreements with "hard-line military leaders" Defence Minister Vazgen Sargsyan, Prime Minister Robert Kocharyan and Interior and National Security Minister Serzh Sargsyan over the Nagorno-Karabakh settlement negotiations with Azerbaijan. After Ter-Petrosyan's resignation, Siradeghyan became the leader of the Pan-Armenian National Movement.

In January 1999, Aghvan Hovsepyan, the Prosecutor General of Armenia, called on the National Assembly of Armenia to strip Siradeghyan of his parliamentary immunity for allegedly ordering the murder of two police officers in January 1994. Siradeghyan was charged with 10 offenses, including arson, murder, attempted murder and conspiracy. As a response to these actions, Siradeghyan claimed that "they [the authorities, i.e., Robert Kocharyan's administration] want to strengthen their power and strengthen their grip on power in Armenia." Meanwhile, Siradeghyan left Armenia for two weeks. In February the National Assembly voted in favor of depriving him of his parliamentary immunity from prosecution. In February 1999 the Deputy Minister of the Interior and National Security and commander of Armenia's internal troops, General Artsrun Makaryan was shot dead, "prompting speculation that he had been killed to prevent him from giving evidence against Siradeghyan."

In March 1999, Siradeghyan was reelected chairman of the Pan-Armenian National Movement. At the 11th PANM congress, Siradeghyan criticized President Kocharyan and his alleged "military-police system".

Siradeghyan was arrested on May 3, 1999, at Zvartnots Airport after returning to Armenia from Bulgaria. However, the Office of the Prosecutor General did not submit a request describing accusations against Siradeghyan. On May 7, Siradeghyan was released from custody and continued the election campaign.

The parliamentary election in Armenia took place on May 30, 1999. Siradeghyan's Pan-Armenian National Movement won only 1.2% of the overall vote. However, Siradeghyan was elected from a single-constituency district in Yerevan.

== Disappearance ==
Siradeghyan left Armenia in early April 2000 after the National Assembly lifted his parliamentary immunity to allow for his criminal prosecution. Armenia's former Foreign Minister Alexander Arzoumanian replaced him as leader of the Pan-Armenian National Movement in December 2000. Siradeghyan was deprived of his parliamentary mandate later in November 2001 due to missing more than half of the parliamentary sessions.

Following his disappearance, Siradeghyan wrote a number of political articles for the newspaper Haykakan Zhamanak under the pen name Avetis Harutyunyan, which were later published in a collection titled Gyadaneri zhamanakě (The era of rascals).

In July 2012, a petition for the return of Siradeghyan was initiated by a social network group.

On July 25, 2012, Siradeghyan's former bodyguard Suren Sirunyan held a press conference. He claimed that he is the last person to see Siradeghyan on April 3, 2000, when Siradeghyan allegedly fled Armenia. In 2012, both Sirunyan and Siradeghyan's wife, Ruzan Tonoyan, denied reports that Siradeghyan had died in exile.

== Political commentary ==
On January 26, 1999, in his first interview since resignation in February 1998 Levon Ter-Petrosyan harshly criticized the charges against Siradeghyan.

During parliamentary talks on Siradeghyan's issue, Hovik Abrahamyan, the Speaker of the National Assembly stated "I’m not expecting him; if he wants to come back, let him come, it’s his business." Hayk Babukhanyan, MP from the Republican Party of Armenia, stated in August 2012 that Siradeghyan "should face a trial" and "should carry the responsibility for the crimes he committed." Babukhanyan claimed that if Siradeghyan were to return, Levon Ter-Petrosyan "will run away".

Siradeghyan's supporters credit him with fighting rampant organized crime in Yerevan during his time as minister of internal affairs and praise his written works. Writer Sergey Galoyan stated that Siradeghyan is "one of the best modern writers, [and] a charismatic figure." Galoyan also claimed that "in the 90s Siradeghyan did in Armenia what Benito Mussolini did in 1923, that is, he 'uprooted mobsters'."

== Personal life ==
Siradeghyan was married with five children. His wife, Ruzan Tonoyan, is the director of Khnko Aper Children's Library in Yerevan.

== Death ==
Siradeghyan died on 15 October 2021 at the age of 74. A governmental commission was formed in Armenia to transfer his body; it was never disclosed where Siradeghyan had died. His remains were buried in his home village of Koti on 4 December 2021 after a wake at the Yerevan Opera Theatre.

== Publications ==
- Kiraki (Կիրակի, Sunday, short stories), Yerevan, 1983
- Tsanr luys (Ծանր լույս, Heavy light, short stories), Yerevan, 1987
- Shat chʻhamarvi (Շատ չհամարվի, Let it not be considered too much), Yerevan, 1993
- Dzeṛkd et tar tsʻavi vrayitsʻ (Ձեռքդ ետ տար ցավի վրայից, Take your hand off of pain), Yerevan, 2000
- Gyadaneri zhamanakě (Գյադաների ժամանակը, The time of rascals), Yerevan, 2005
- Erkir Tsʻpahanj (Երկիր Ցպահանջ, Country on demand), Yerevan, 2011

Preceded by Ashot Mirzoyan	Mayor of Yerevan; 1996-1998	Succeeded by Suren Abrahamyan
