= Albert Bazeyan =

Armenian politician

- Ալբերտ Բազեյան
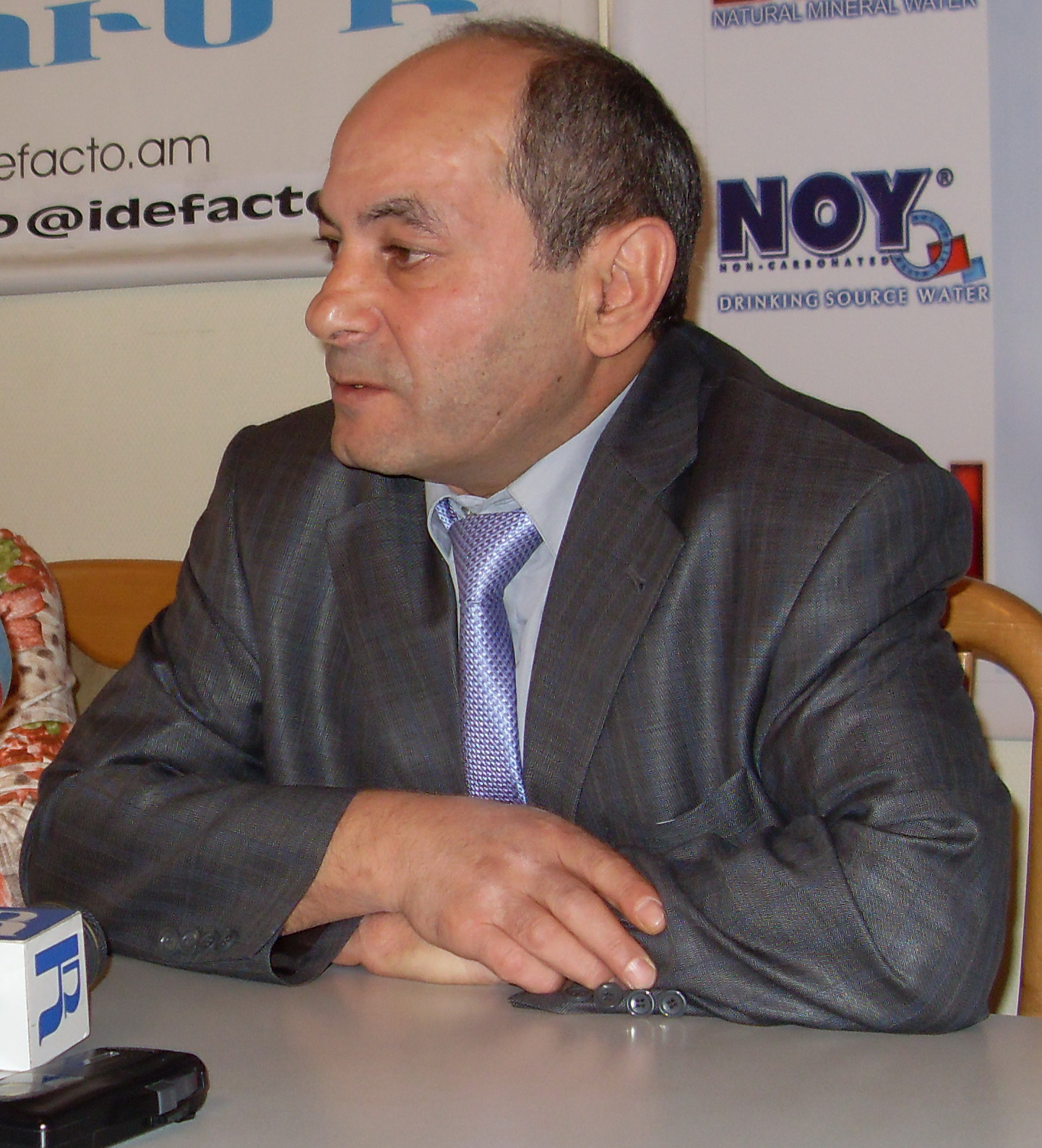
- Bazeyan in 2008

Mayor of Yerevan
- In office August 1999 – January 2001
- President: Robert Kocharyan
- Preceded by: Suren Abrahamyan
- Succeeded by: Robert Nazaryan

Vice-Speaker of the Parliament of Armenia
- In office 1996–1999
- President: Levon Ter-Petrosyan; Robert Kocharyan

Leader of the Republic Party

Personal details
- Born: 28 May 1956 Lanjaghbyur, Armenia SSR, Soviet Union
- Party: Hanrapetutyun Party
- Education: Yerevan Institute of Physical Culture
- Occupation: teacher, coach
- Awards: Order of the Combat Cross

Military service
- Branch/service: Soviet Army; Armed Forces of Armenia
- Years of service: 1976—1977; 1993—1994
- Battles/wars: First Nagorno-Karabakh War

Albert Bazeyan (Armenian: Ալբերտ Բազեյան; born 28 May 1956) is an Armenian politician. He served as Mayor of Yerevan from August 1999 to January 2001.

== Biography ==
Albert Bazeyan was born in Lanjaghbyur, Armenia SSR. He attended the Yerevan Institute of Physical Culture from 1971 to 1976, where he earned a PhD. From 1976 to 1977, he served in the Soviet Army, then returned to the Armenian Institute of Physical Culture, where he worked at as a coach and a teacher. Bazeyan was sent to Moscow as a trainee researcher and received his postgraduate diploma at the Central State Institute of Physical Culture in Moscow, which he attended from 1984 to 1987. He then became a researcher at the Armenian Institute of Physical Culture in 1988.

In 1993, Bazeyan left the Armenian Institute of Physical Culture and became the Deputy Chairman of the Yerkrapah Volunteer Union. He also began working at the Armenian Defense Ministry that same year. Bazeyan became a member of the National Assembly of Armenia, Vice-Speaker of the National Assembly, and Chairman of the Yerkrapah in 1996. He was also awarded the Order of the Combat Cross (2nd degree) for his services during the First Nagorno-Karabakh War.

Bazeyan was reelected Vice-Speaker on 30 May 1999 and joined the Unity bloc led by Vazgen Sargsyan and Karen Demirchyan. He was elected Mayor of Yerevan in August 1999 and served until January 2001. In 2003, he became a member of parliament again as a member of the Standing Committee on Defense, National Security and Internal Affairs. Bazeyan joined opposition Hanrapetutyun Party and left the parliament in 2007.

=== Coup attempt ===
On September 24, 2023, Bazeyan would be arrested by the National Security Service for his alleged role in a coup plot involving members of the Khachakirner militia.

== Awards ==
- (Armenia) Order of the Combat Cross, 2nd degree (1996)

Preceded by Suren Abrahamyan	Mayor of Yerevan; 1999-2001	Succeeded by Robert Nazaryan
