= Mayor of Yerevan =

- Երևանի քաղաքապետ (Armenian)
- Flag of Yerevan

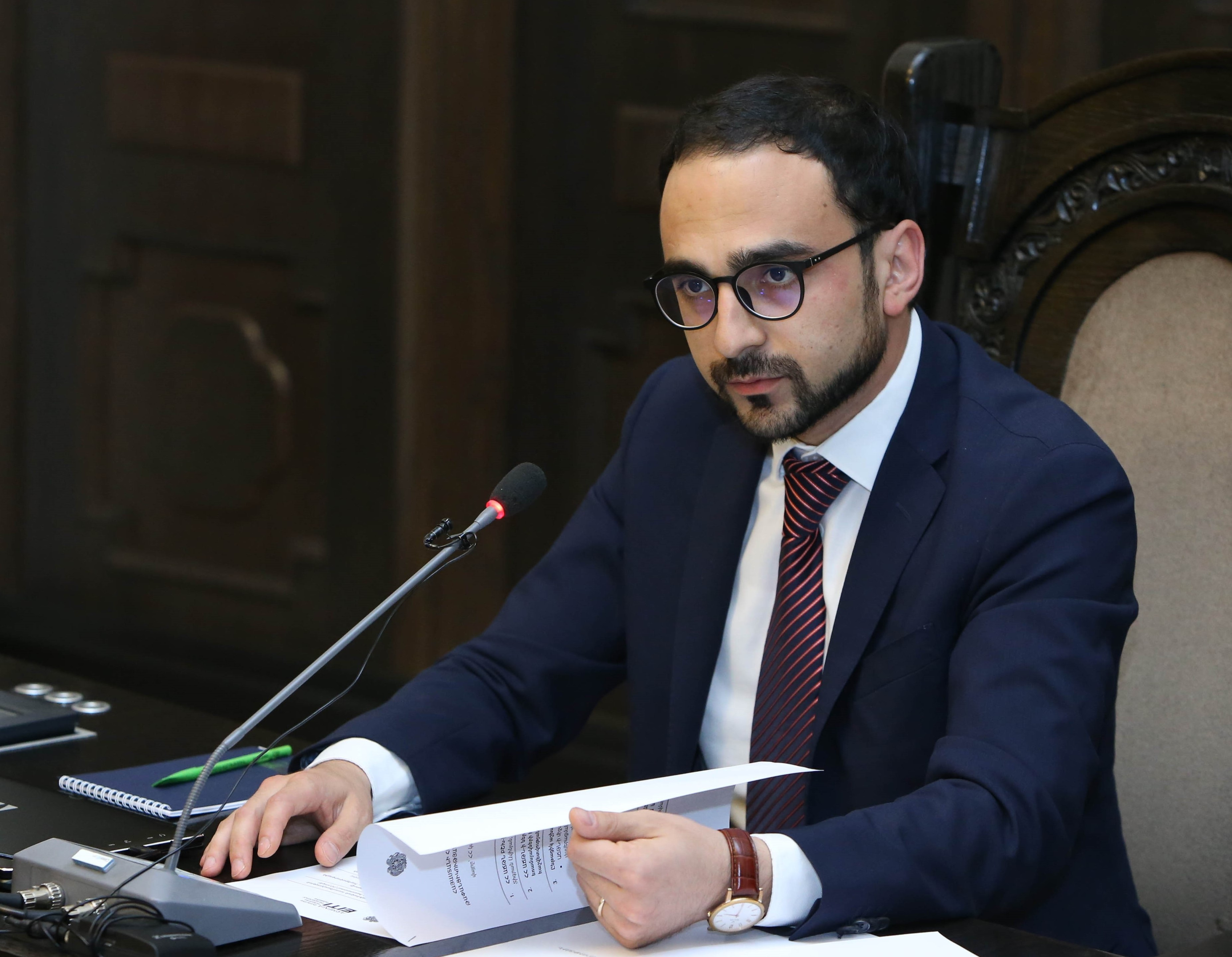
- Incumbent; Tigran Avinyan since September 10, 2023
- Residence: Yerevan City Hall
- Appointer: Yerevan City Council
- Term length: Five years, renewable
- Inaugural holder: Hovhannes Ghorghanyan
- Formation: 1879
- Website: Official website

The Mayor of Yerevan (Armenian: Երևանի քաղաքապետ, romanized: Yerevani k'aghak'apet) is head of the executive branch of Yerevan's government. The mayor is elected by the Yerevan City Council. Recent city council elections took place in 2018, 2017 and 2013.

== List of mayors ==
N	Image	Mayor	Start date	End date	Political affiliation	Note(s)
1		Hovhannes Ghorghanyan	October 1879	September 1884		
2		Barsegh Gueghanyan	September 1884	December 1893		
3		Levon Tigranyants	January 1894	June 1895		
4		Aram Bounyatyan	November 1895	October 1896		
5		Vahan Ter-Sarkayan	October 1896	November 1898		
6		Isahak Melik-Aghamalyan	November 1898	March 1904		
7		Hovhannes Melik-Aghamalian	March 1904	December 1910		
8		Hovsep Tigranov	January 1911	March 1912		
9		Hovhannes Melik-Aghamalyan	February 1912	December 1914		Former mayor from 1904 to 1910
10		Smbat Khachaturyants	February 1915	December 1917		
11		Tadevos Toshyan	November 20, 1917	December 25, 1918		
12		Mkrtich Mussinyants	January 9, 1919	November 27, 1920		
13		Hrant Tavakyalian	December 4, 1920	February 25, 1921		
14		Kevork Sarksyan	April 7, 1921	April 26, 1921		
15		Benyamin Sahakian	April 26, 1921	May 26, 1921		
16		Ruben Safrazpekian	May 26, 1921	April 10, 1922		
17		Hayk Azatian	January 3, 1922	February 25, 1922		
18		Suren Shadunts	May 5, 1922	July 29, 1922	Communist Party of the Soviet Union	
19		Arakel Avakian	July 7, 1922	June 11, 1923	Communist Party of the Soviet Union	
20		Aram Chakheltian	October 13, 1923	August 12, 1924	Communist Party of the Soviet Union	
21		Aram Kostanian	November 24, 1924	January 30, 1928	Communist Party of the Soviet Union	
22		Vartan Mamikonian	February 29, 1928	June 7, 1928	Communist Party of the Soviet Union	
23		Kevork Hanessoghlian	June 7, 1928	May 5, 1930	Communist Party of the Soviet Union	
24		Sergei Mardvian	August 4, 1930	January 4, 1931	Communist Party of the Soviet Union	
25		Assadour Asriyan	January 4, 1931	December 13, 1931	Communist Party of the Soviet Union	
26		Aramais Erzinkyan	December 13, 1931	March 1, 1933	Communist Party of the Soviet Union	
27		Karapet Matinian	March 18, 1933	August 1, 1936	Communist Party of the Soviet Union	
28		Gevorg Hanessoghlian	August 1, 1936	November 15, 1936	Communist Party of the Soviet Union	
29		Alexander Shahsuvarian	January 29, 1937	September 1, 1937	Communist Party	
30		Levon Hovsepian	October 2, 1937	December 17, 1938	Communist Party	
31		Soghomon Varapetian	December 17, 1938	January 2, 1940	Communist Party	
32		Sarkis Kamalian	January 9, 1940	May 19, 1943	Communist Party	
33		Zaven Tchartchian	May 20, 1943	September 4, 1944	Communist Party	
34		Ashot Ghakarian	September 4, 1944	April 2, 1945	Communist Party	
35		Levon Hovsepian	April 30, 1945	March 30, 1947	Communist Party	Former mayor from 1937 to 1938
36		Yeghishe Vartanian	March 30, 1947	May 9, 1952	Communist Party	
37		Vazrik Sekoyan	May 10, 1952	April 13, 1954	Communist Party	
38		Papken Asdvadzadrian	April 14, 1954	March 31, 1955	Communist Party	
39		Gurgen Tcholakhian	April 6, 1955	June 1, 1957	Communist Party	
40		Gurgen Pahlevanian	June 2, 1957	March 21, 1960	Communist Party	
41		Souren Vartanian	March 22, 1960	December 6, 1962	Communist Party	
42		Grigor Hasratian	December 17, 1962	February 12, 1975	Communist Party	
43		Hrant Enkitarian	March 18, 1975	April 28, 1975	Communist Party	
44		Murad Muradian	May 1, 1975	December 9, 1985		ex-deputy of National Assembly and ex-Minister of Ecology
45		Eduard Avakian	December 10, 1985	October 9, 1989		
46		Artashes Geghamyan	November 10, 1989	October 2, 1990	Communist Party	Deputy since 1995
47		Hambardzum Galstyan	December 4, 1990	December 22, 1992	Pan-Armenian National Movement	
48		Vahagn Khachatryan	December 4, 1992	February 22, 1996	Pan-Armenian National Movement	
49		Ashot Mirzoyan	February 23, 1996	November 7, 1996		Municipal advisor of Gyumri
50		Vano Siradeghyan	November 14, 1996	February 2, 1998	Pan-Armenian National Movement	Former deputy and former Interior minister
51		Suren Abrahamyan	May 6, 1998	June 15, 1999	Republican Party	Former Interior minister
52		Albert Bazeyan	August 9, 1999	January 10, 2001	Republican Party	ex-president of the Republican Party, vice-president of the National Assembly
53		Robert Nazaryan	January 11, 2001	June 30, 2003		
54		Yervand Zakharyan	July 1, 2003	March 4, 2009	Republican Party	
55		Gagik Beglaryan	June 11, 2009	December 8, 2010	Republican Party	Resigned after high-profile scandal
56		Karen Karapetyan	December 17, 2010	November 2011	Independent	
57		Taron Margaryan	November 15, 2011	July 9, 2018	Republican Party	
—		Kamo Areyan	July 9, 2018	October 13, 2018	Republican Party	
58		Hayk Marutyan	October 13, 2018	December 22, 2021	Civil Contract	Removed from the post after losing the no confidence vote.
59		Hrachya Sargsyan	December 22, 2021	March 17, 2023	My Step Alliance	
60		Tigran Avinyan	October 10, 2023	Incumbent	Civil Contract	
