= Mkhitar Sebastatsi Educational Complex =

Coordinates: 40°10′10″N 44°26′23″E

- Մխիթար Սեբաստացի կրթահամալիր

Location
- Raffi street 57; Yerevan; Armenia

Information
- Type: Public
- Established: 1984
- Founders: Ashot Dabaghyan, Ashot Manucharyan, Ashot Bleyan
- Principal: Ashot Bleyan
- Grades: Pre-school; 1 - 12
- Colours: Red and white
- Athletics: Basketball, handball, athletics
- Affiliations: Ministry of Education of Armenia
- Languages: Armenian, English, Russian
- Website: Official website

Mkhitar Sebastatsi Educational Complex (Armenian: Մխիթար Սեբաստացի կրթահամալիր), is a state-owned school located in the Malatia-Sebastia District of Yerevan, the capital of Armenia. The school is named after the prominent Armenian scholar and theologian Mkhitar Sebastatsi of the 18th century.

== Overview ==
The school was founded in 1984 as School No. 183 by Ashot Dabaghyan, Ashot Manucharyan, and Ashot Bleyan. The school was granted "experimental" status by the Soviet Armenian Ministry of Education in 1987 and expanded into a complex in 1989. It played a key role in the Karabakh movement during perestroika and one of its founders Ashot Manucharyan; was a member of the Karabakh Committee. Its current principal is Ashot Bleyan.

== Structure ==
The structure of the complex is as follows:

- Kindergarten
- Primary school
- Middle school
- High school
- Art school for juniors
- Art school for seniors
- Crafts school for seniors
- Sports school
- Music and dance school
