= Aram Manukyan =

Armenian politician (born 1957)

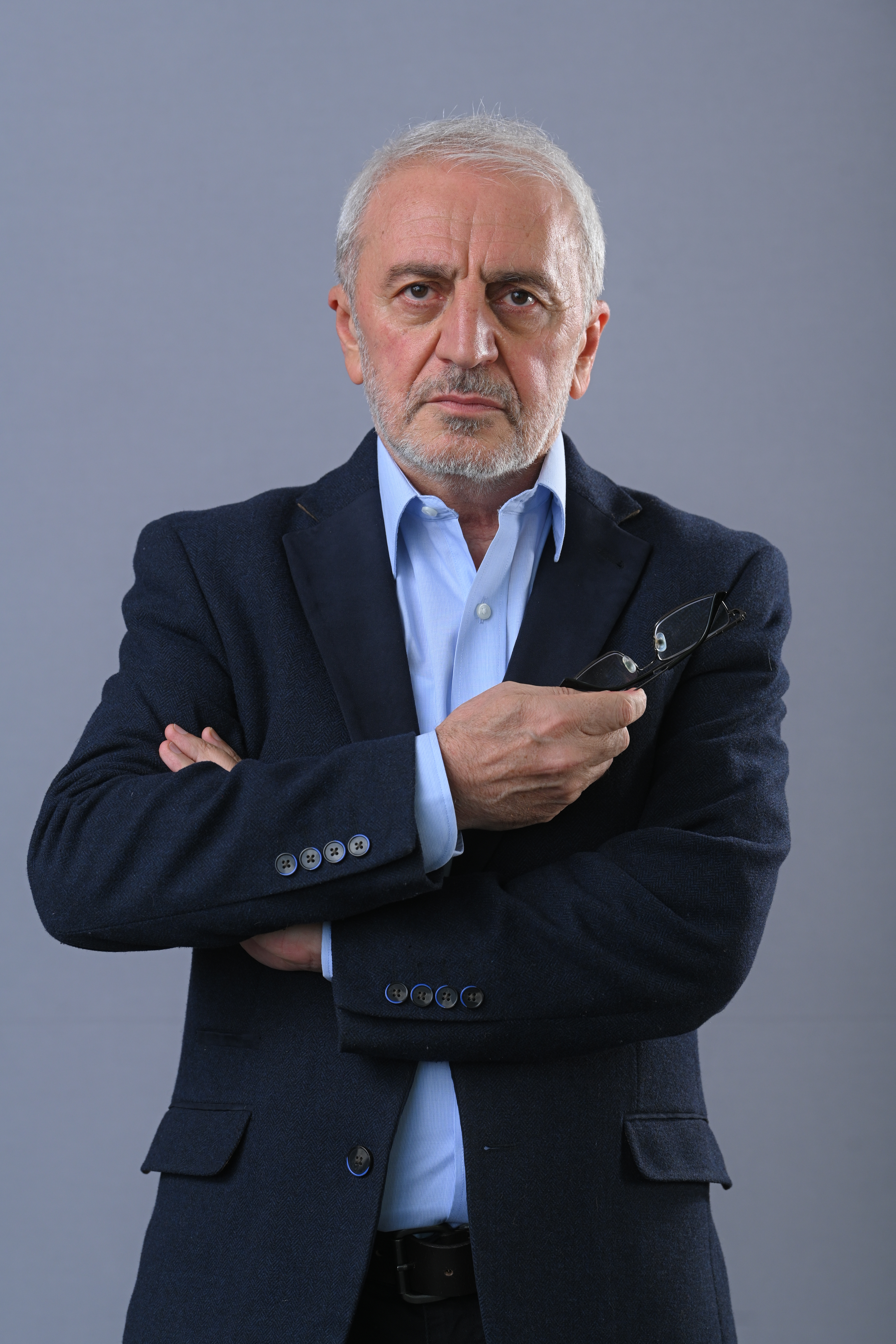
Aram Manukyan

Aram Manukyan (Armenian: Արամ Մանուկյան; born March 9, 1957) is an Armenian politician.

== Early life ==
Born in Vanadzor, Manukian graduated from the Hovhannes Tumanyan State Pedagogical University with a degree in physics. Between 1978 and 1983 he worked as a teacher at a secondary school in Yeghegnut. Between 1983 and 1993 he was an engineer at the Avtomatika Scientific-Production Association of Vanadzor.

== Political career ==
Manukyan was elected to the Supreme Council in May 1990 parliamentary election from the Pan-Armenian National Movement and served as the deputy chairman of the Committee on Science, Language and Culture. To symbolize the revival of the Armenian statehood, the initial declaration of the independence of Armenia from the Soviet Union on 23 August 1990 was read by him because he bore the same name as Aram Manukian (1879-1919), the founder of the First Republic of Armenia. He was reelected in 1995 and remained a member of the parliament until 1999.

He returned to the Armenian parliament in 2012 when he was elected by the party-list of Armenian National Congress.
