= Hambardzum Galstyan =

Armenian politician and historian (1955–1994)

- Համբարձում Գալստյան
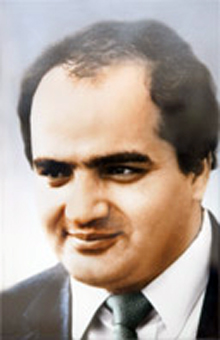

Chairman of the Yerevan City Council
- In office December 4, 1990 – December 22, 1992
- Preceded by: Artashes Geghamyan
- Succeeded by: Vahagn Khachatryan

Personal details
- Born: December 14, 1955; Yerevan, Armenian SSR, Soviet Union
- Died: December 17, 1994 (aged 39); Yerevan, Armenia
- Manner of death: Assassination by gunshots
- Occupation: Historian, politician

Hambardzum Paylaki Galstyan (Armenian: Համբարձում Փայլակի Գալստյան; December 14, 1955 – December 17, 1994) was an Armenian politician and historian who served as the Chairman of the Yerevan City Council (Mayor of Yerevan) from 1990 to 1992 and was a prominent member of the Karabakh Committee. On December 17, 1994, he was assassinated by unknown assailants.

== Biography ==
Hambardzum Paylaki Galstyan was born on December 14, 1955, in Yerevan. He graduated from the Faculty of History of Yerevan State University with the qualification of historian-ethnographer.

From 1978 to 1983 he worked at the Armenia Ethnography Museum as a senior researcher. In 1983 he defended his doctoral dissertation at the Institute of Anthropology and Ethnography in Moscow and received the degree of Candidate of Historical Sciences.

Starting from 1988 he actively participated in the Karabakh movement to unite the Nagorno-Karabakh Autonomous Oblast with Armenia. He became one of the leaders of the movement and was a member of the Karabakh Committee, which coordinated the protests of the Karabakh movement.

In December 1989, he was arrested along with other members of the Karabakh Committee and spent six months in Moscow's Butyrka Prison. After his release from prison, he worked at the Institute of History of the Academy of Sciences of Armenia as a senior researcher.

In 1990, he was elected a member of Yerevan City Council, and served as the chairman of the Yerevan City Council from December 4, 1990, to December 22, 1992.

After 1992, Galstyan broke with his former colleagues from the Karabakh Committee who had come to power in Armenia, namely Levon Ter-Petrosyan and Minister of Internal Affairs Vano Siradeghyan. Galstyan accused Siradeghyan of ordering more than 30 politically motivated murders and accused Ter-Petrosyan of "tolerating political terror". In 1994, Galstyan co-founded the National Democratic Union opposition party together with former Karabakh Committee members Ashot Manucharyan and Vazgen Manukyan.

== Death ==
Galstyan was shot and killed outside of his home in Yerevan on December 17, 1994. His brother, who was with him at the time of the murder, chased after the assailants but was unable to catch them. Various theories exist about who ordered Galstyan's murder. Many speculated that Vano Siradeghyan had ordered the murder, while in 1996, Defense Minister Vazgen Sargsyan argued that the murder was the work of the "Dro" group, an alleged secret terrorist group within the Armenian Revolutionary Federation, with the intention of causing further hostility between the former Karabakh Committee members in power and those in opposition.
