= Gagik Beglaryan =

Armenian politician

- Գագիկ Բեգլարյան
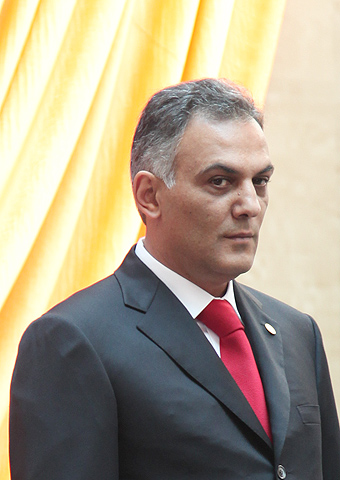
- Beglaryan in 2014

Minister of Transport and Communications of Armenia
- In office June 16, 2012 – September 20, 2016
- Succeeded by: Vahan Vardkesi Martirosyan

Mayor of Yerevan
- In office June 11, 2009 – December 8, 2010
- Preceded by: Yervand Zakharyan
- Succeeded by: Karen Karapetyan

Personal details
- Born: January 1, 1964 (age 62)
- Party: Republican Party of Armenia
- Spouse: Married
- Children: Two children
- Occupation: Politician, economist
- Profession: Armenian

Gagik Beglaryan (Armenian: Գագիկ Բեգլարյան) (born January 1, 1964), also knowns as "Cherny" Gago, is an Armenian politician, former mayor of Yerevan. He was the Minister of Transport and Communications of Armenia from 2012 until 2016.

On 4 March 2009, he was appointed acting mayor of Yerevan, pending the 31 May municipal elections. He was then appointed mayor on 8 June, after his party, the Republican Party of Armenia, won the election.

On 8 December 2010 he resigned as mayor, having assaulted an official, following an incident at a Plácido Domingo concert. The official – Aram Kandayan, an employee at the President's protocol department – had asked the mayor's wife to give up her seat. She had been sitting next to the President Serzh Sargsyan in a seat normally reserved for the Prime Minister or the Catholicos of All Armenians. Although not present at the concert, Beglaryan arranged to meet Kandayan after the event and assaulted the latter before he could get out of his car.

On June 16, 2012, he was appointed Minister of Transport and Communications.

Beglaryan is an economist by training, having studied at the Yerevan State University, School of Physics and Mathematics (1978-1981) and the Yerevan Institute of National Economy (1981-1985). In 2004, he defended his thesis “The main social problems of community management”.

He is married with two children.

== See also ==
- List of mayors of Yerevan

Preceded by Yervand Zakharyan	Mayor of Yerevan; 2009-2010	Succeeded by Karen Karapetyan
