= Yervand Zakharyan =

Armenian politician

- Երվանդ Զախարյան
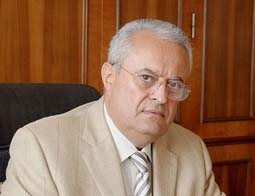
- Zakharyan in 2006

Minister of Energy and Natural Resources
- Incumbent
- Assumed office April 30, 2014
- President: Serzh Sargsyan
- Preceded by: Armen Movsisyan

Mayor of Yerevan
- In office July 1, 2003 – 2009
- Preceded by: Robert Nazaryan
- Succeeded by: Gagik Beglaryan

Minister of the State Revenues
- In office 2001–2002

Minister of Transport and Communication
- In office 2001–2001
- President: Robert Kocharyan

Deputy Minister of the State Revenues
- Incumbent
- Assumed office 2000

Minister of Transport
- In office 1998–2000
- President: Robert Kocharyan
- Succeeded by: Robert Nazaryan

Armenia Deputy Minister of Energy

Personal details
- Born: May 14, 1946 (age 79) village of Saler, Shamkir region, Azerbaijan SSR
- Party: Republican Party of Armenia
- Spouse: Married
- Children: Three children
- Occupation: Politician
- Profession: Armenian

Yervand Zakharyan (Armenian: Երվանդ Զախարյան; born 14 May 1946) is an Armenian politician and the former mayor of the Armenian capital Yerevan. He is a member of the country's Republican Party and was the 8th mayor of the Armenian capital since Armenia's independence from the Soviet Union in 1991.

== Biography ==
Zakharyan was born in the village of Saler in the Shamkir region of the Azerbaijan SSR. He worked in the Yerevan trust "Basemetalsconstruct" from 1962 to 1963 and as a rigger in the plant "Razdanconstruct" in 1963 to 1964. He served as an engineer and chief of the zone of the constructional administration "Warmconstrict" during the rest of the 1960s, while simultaneously attending Yerevan Polytechnic Institute (where he graduated from 1968). He attended the Management Institute of the Moscow Academy of National Economy from 1987 to 1988. He completed his candidate thesis in 1991, obtaining a degree of candidate of science in economics.

After Armenia became independent, Zakharyan assumed the position of Armenia's deputy minister of energy. In 1998, he became the Minister of Transport and in 2000 was appointed deputy minister of the State Revenues, then was overappointed the Minister of Transport and Communication. The following year, he became the Minister of the State Revenues and in 2002. He was then appointed mayor of Yerevan in 2003. In 2006, he started the non-profit "Shushi Revival" fund to help revitalize the city of Shushi in Artsakh.

In September 2019, the Special Investigative Service of Armenia has initiated a criminal case, on the grounds of abuse of office, against Yervand Zakharyan. The criminal case is related to the alienation of 10 000 square meters of land of Haghtanak Park of Yerevan by illegal decision of Yervand Zakharyan while he was the mayor of Yerevan.

Zakharyan is married and has three children.

== See also ==
- List of mayors of Yerevan

Preceded by Robert Nazaryan	Mayor of Yerevan; 2003-2009	Succeeded by Gagik Beglaryan
