= Aram Bounyatyan =

Former Mayor of Yerevan

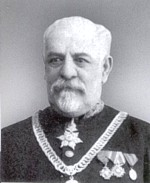

4th Mayor of Yerevan
- In office 1895–1896
- Preceded by: Levon Tigranyants
- Succeeded by: Vahan Ter-Sarkayan

Personal details
- Born: 1839
- Died: Unknown

Aram Buniatyan (born 1839) was the fourth mayor of Yerevan.

== Biography ==
Aram Buniatyan was born in 1839 in the family of a soldier. He received an education at the Lazarian Seminary in Moscow but left it incomplete. In 1859, at the age of 20, he joined the service in the Tiflis provincial administration. Five years later, he moved to Yerevan to do the same job. Back in 1884, he was elected a member of the Yerevan city duma, acting mayor under Barsegh Geghamyan. Ten years later, in 1895, he was elected mayor of Yerevan, replacing Levon Tigranyants. He held the position for one year, until 1896, after which he left the job due to health problems.
