= Koti, Armenia =

Village in Tavush, Armenia

Koti Կոթի
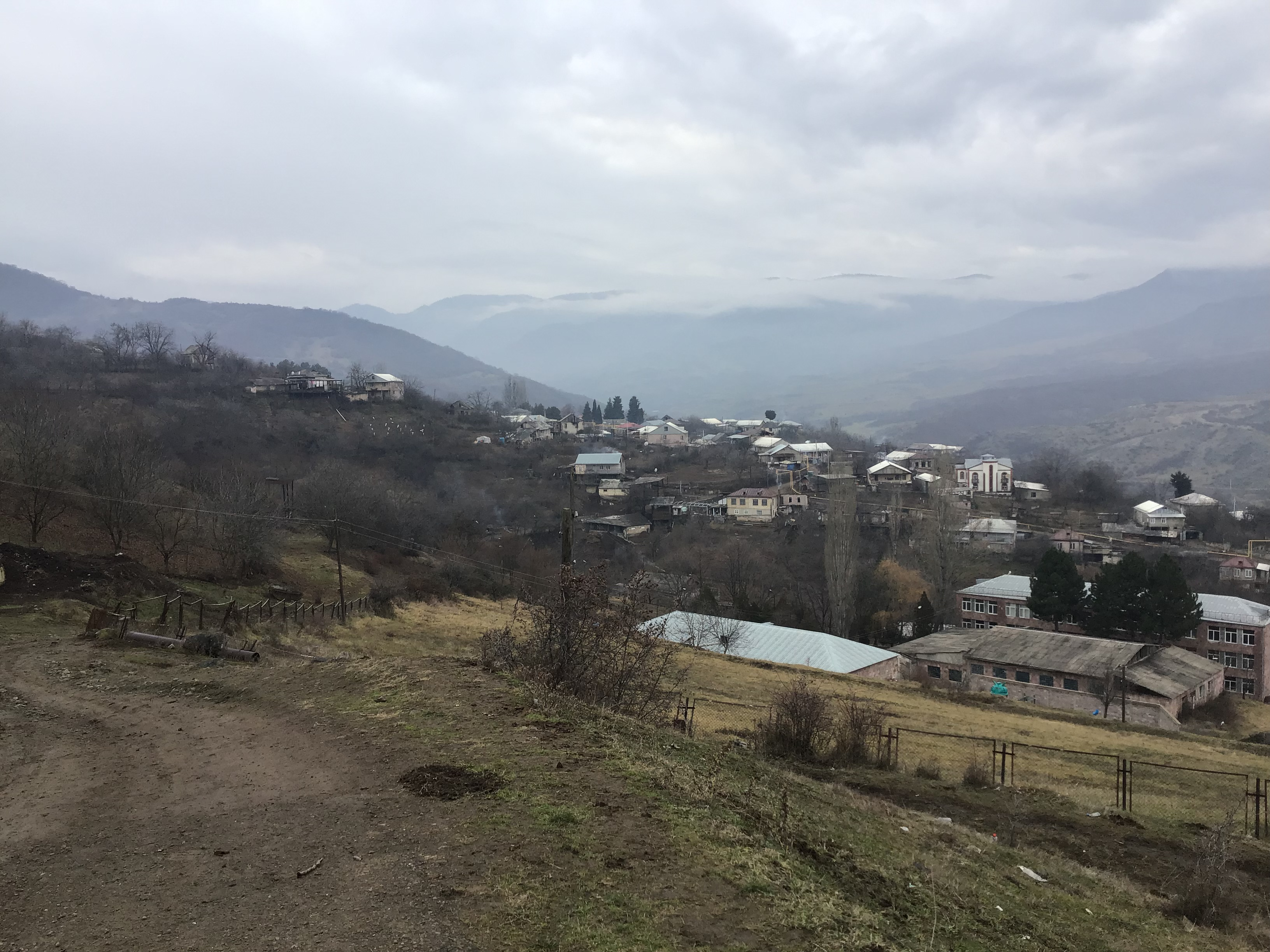

- Location within Armenia Location within Tavush
- Coordinates: 41°08′08″N 45°07′30″E
- Country: Armenia
- Province: Tavush
- Municipality: Noyemberyan
- Elevation: 750 m (2,460 ft)

Population (2011)
  - Total: 2,014
- Time zone: UTC+4 (AMT)

Koti (Armenian: Կոթի) is a village in the Noyemberyan Municipality of the Tavush Province of Armenia near the border with Azerbaijan. The village is located 5 kilometres east of Saint Sargis Monastery.

== Etymology ==
The village was known in 1920 as Kotikend (Կոթիքենդ) or Kotigegh (Կոթիգեղ), later being renamed to Shavarshavan (Շավարշավան) in 1961 in honour of Armenian revolutionary Shavarsh Amirkhanyan who hailed from the village. Following the independence of Armenia, the village was finally renamed Koti.

== Education ==
Children of Armenia Fund (COAF) started its activities in Tavush in 2016, including education and health programs, shelter from shelling and other potential use of weapons in areas along the border with Azerbaijan.

== Economy ==
The population is engaged cattle breeding, fruit growing, tobacco growing, cultivation of grain and fodder crops.

== History ==
Koti in the Russian Empire from 1828–1840 formed a part of the Georgian Governorate, and later of the Georgia-Imeretia Governorate 1840–1845, then of the Tiflis Governorate until it finally became part of the Kazakh uezd of the Elizavetpol Governorate in 1868.

In 1918, the First Republic of Armenia declared its independence from the Russian SFSR and became the controller of Koti, then known as Kotikend or Kotigegh. During the Armenian–Azerbaijani war, Koti and Kalacha (present-day Berdavan) were occupied by the Azerbaijan Democratic Republic on 7 April 1920 as a result of the hostilities in Nagorno-Karabakh; later after a brief ceasefire on 9 April, Koti and Kurumsulu (Barekamavan) were burned. After the Soviet invasion of Azerbaijan, the Russian SFSR and Armenia concluded an agreement on 10 August 1920 to delineate Soviet Azerbaijan's border—in which Koti was confirmed within the bounds of Armenia.

In 1930, the Armenian SSR experienced an administrative reorganisation that transformed its uezds into raions. Koti which was formerly part of the Dilijan Uyezd subsequently became a part of the Ijevan District.

== Climate ==
Koti has a humid continental climate (Dfa) with hot summers and cold, often snowy winters.

Climate data for Koti, Armenia
Month	Jan	Feb	Mar	Apr	May	Jun	Jul	Aug	Sep	Oct	Nov	Dec	Year
Mean daily maximum °C (°F)	7 (45)	8 (46)	12 (54)	17 (63)	22 (72)	26 (79)	29 (84)	29 (84)	24 (75)	18 (64)	13 (55)	8 (46)	18 (64)
Daily mean °C (°F)	3 (37)	3.5 (38.3)	7.5 (45.5)	12 (54)	16.5 (61.7)	21 (70)	23 (73)	23.5 (74.3)	18.5 (65.3)	13 (55)	9.5 (49.1)	4.5 (40.1)	13.0 (55.3)
Mean daily minimum °C (°F)	−1 (30)	−1 (30)	3 (37)	7 (45)	11 (52)	16 (61)	17 (63)	18 (64)	13 (55)	8 (46)	6 (43)	1 (34)	8 (47)
Source: https://www.accuweather.com/en/am/koti/11639/weather-forecast/11639

== Demographics ==
The population of the village since 1831 is as follows:

Year	Population
1831	777
1873	1,216
1886	1,507
1897	1,769
1926	1,889
1931	2,277
1939	2,529
1959	1,950
1970	2,408
1979	2,311
1989	3,556
2001	2,225
2011	2,014

== Notable people ==
- Khoren Bayramyan, professional footballer
- Vano Siradeghyan, writer and politician

== Gallery ==
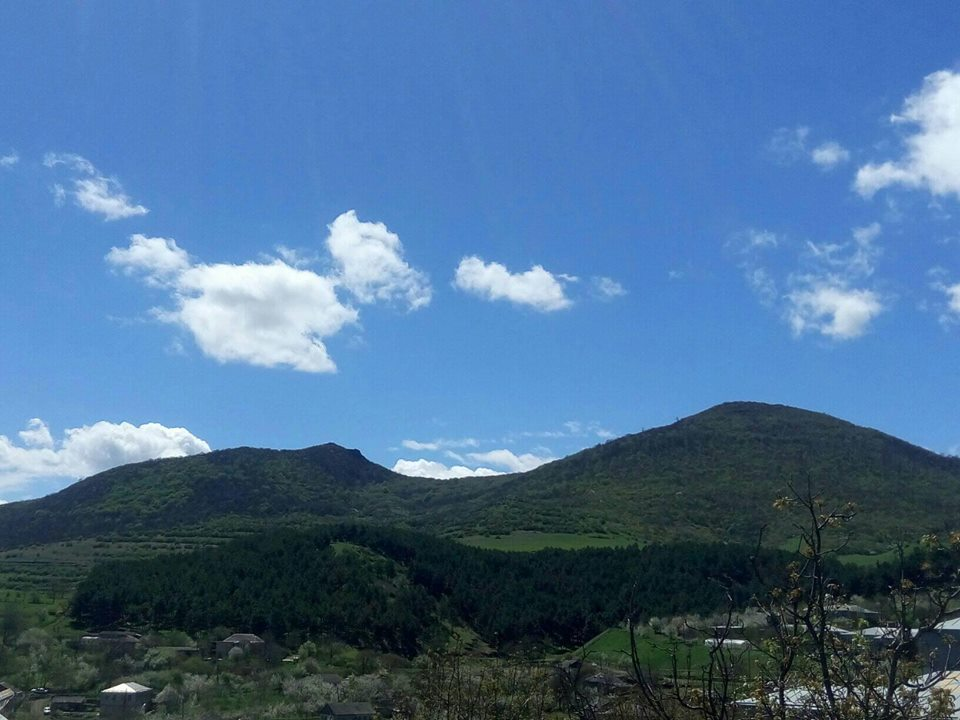

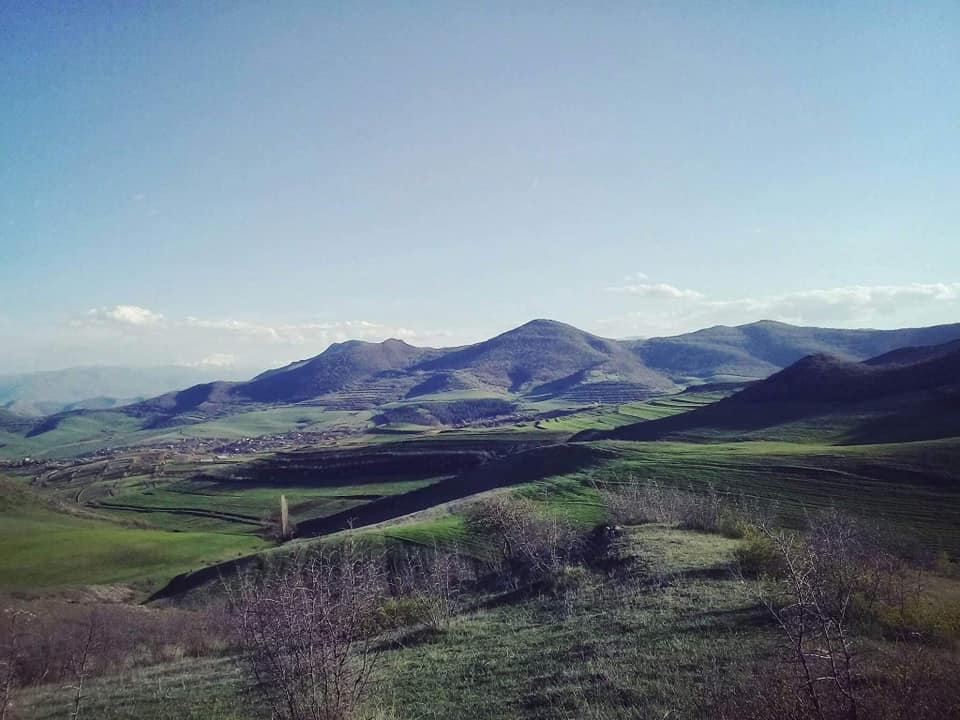
