= Armenian National Movement Party =

Armenian National Movement Party Հայկական ազգային շարժում
- Leader: Ararat Zurabyan
- Founded: 2013
- Preceded by: Pan-Armenian National Movement
- Headquarters: Yerevan
- Ideology: Liberalism; Pro-Europeanism; Anti-EAEU; Anti-Russian sentiment
- National Assembly: 0 / 107

Party flag

The Armenian National Movement (ANM) (Armenian: Հայկական ազգային շարժում, romanized: Hayots’ hamazgayin sharzhum kusakts’ut’yun) is a political party in Armenia. It is led by Ararat Zurabyan, the former chairman of the Pan-Armenian National Movement and a former member of the Free Democrats.

== History ==
The Armenian National Movement (ANM) traces its early history to the Pan-Armenian National Movement. The ANM joined the Armenian National Congress political coalition and endorsed Levon Ter-Petrosyan in the run up to the 2008 Armenian presidential election. The ANM, in addition to several other liberal parties, helped to organize protests ahead of the elections. Following the election, Levon Ter-Petrosyan came in second place, with Serzh Sargsyan being elected as president.

Ararat Zurabyan subsequently left the Armenian National Congress coalition and joined the Free Democrats. Following which, the ANM went into a period of inactivity.

The Armenian National Movement was re-registered on 14 May 2013, shortly after the dissolution of its predecessor party, the Pan-Armenian National Movement. The Pan-Armenian National Movement dissolved on 23 February 2013, as most members opted to join the Armenian National Congress, which itself had transformed from a political coalition in 2008 to a political party in 2013, with Levon Ter-Petrosyan remaining as its leader. However, several members did not join the Armenian National Congress party. As such, Ararat Zurabyan, Alexander Arzumanyan, Hovhannes Igityan and Karapet Rubinyan announced the re-registration of the Armenian National Movement. Zurabyan also confirmed that he was leaving the Free Democrats, in order to focus on the activities of the ANM.

The founding congress of the ANM was held on 26 October 2013, in Yerevan. Several guests from other supportive political parties were in attendance. Most notably, Aram Sargsyan, leader of the Republic Party, who congratulated the Armenian National Movement on its renewed establishment.

In March 2014, the party announced it would launch an initiative called the "European Alliance", to unite individuals, public entities and political forces concerned about Armenia's future. Also in March 2014, Zurabyan was invited to speak at a rally organized by Raffi Hovannisian's Heritage party.

On 12 March 2015, party members met with former president Serzh Sargsyan to discuss constitutional reforms.

The party currently has no representation in the National Assembly and acts as an extra-parliamentary force.

== Ideology ==
The party describes itself as a liberal democratic party, with a Pro-European outlook.

In 2013, when Armenia joined the Eurasian Economic Union, Ararat Zurabyan criticized Armenian authorities for putting Russia's interests first. Zurabyan stated, "Integration into Europe was of paramount importance for Armenia and would have brought about radical changes. Unfortunately, we remained outside the process. But Ukraine, Moldova and Georgia go on and Association Agreements with them are likely to be initialed or signed.” Following the governments decision not to sign an Association Agreement with the EU, Zurabyan further stated, "Until September 3, we were going to Europe, and in one day everything collapsed." Party leadership have also critiqued the Armenian National Congress of being too passive on such issues and has been critical of the Republican Party of Armenia.

On 31 March 2014, the party condemned the decision of the Armenian government to vote against a UN vote upholding the territorial integrity of Ukraine, claiming that the government had put the interests of Russia before the national interests of Armenia. Following the vote, the party called for Armenia to reevaluate its membership in the Collective Security Treaty Organization, and to actively develop closer relations with NATO.

In December 2014, Zurabyan stated, "Armenia's membership in the Eurasian Economic Union is the beginning of the collapse of Armenia."

During an interview in December 2015, Zurabyan stated, "Russia is the country for which this conflict is beneficial, because it is its existence, due to which Russia maintains its influence in the region. Without this conflict, Russia's influence in the region will be very questionable," in reference to the ongoing Nagorno-Karabakh conflict.

== Electoral record ==
=== National elections ===
Prior to the 2017 Armenian parliamentary election, Ararat Zurabyan confirmed that the ANM would cooperate with Prosperous Armenia's Tsarukyan Alliance. Some party members participated in the elections under the Tsarukyan Alliance electoral list. Following the election, Ararat Zurabyan renounced his seat in the National Assembly.

=== Local elections ===
The party participated in the 2018 Yerevan City Council elections as part of the "People of Yerevan" electoral alliance. The alliance won just 0.82% of the vote, failing to gain any seats in the Yerevan City Council.

== See also ==
- Programs of political parties in Armenia
