= Aramais Erzinkyan =

Russian revolutionary, and politician (1879 – 1937)

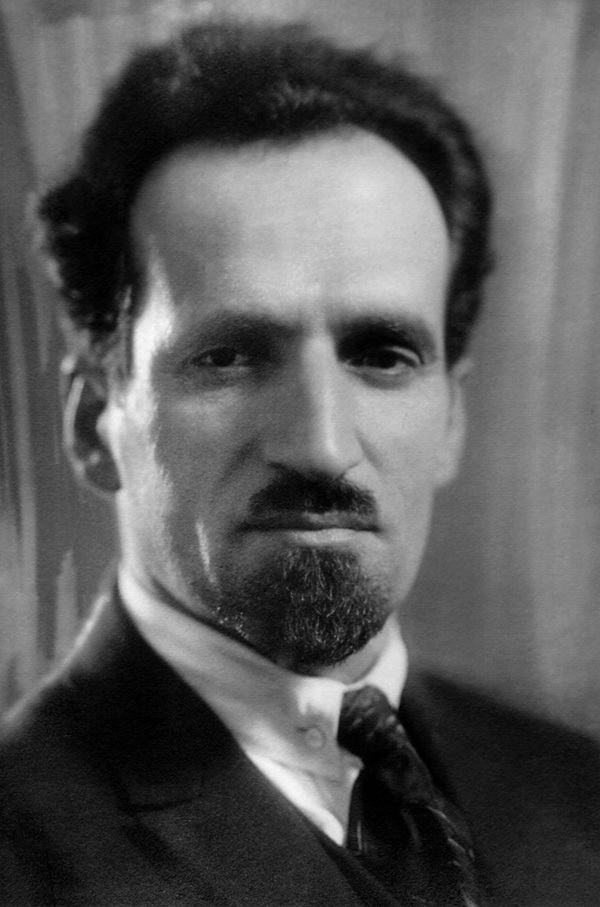

26th mayor of Yerevan
- In office December 13, 1931 – March 1, 1933
- Succeeded by: Karapet Matinian

Personal details
- Born: May 2, 1879 Haghpat, Tiflis Uyezd, Tiflis Governorate, Caucasian Viceroyalty, Russian Empire
- Died: 1937
- Children: Yuri Erzinkyan
- Education: Nersisyan school( 1898 ) University of Geneva

Aramais Harutyunovich (Artemyevich) Erzinkyan (Armenian: Արամայիս Հարությունի Երզնկյան, May 2, 1879, Haghpat, Caucasian governorship –1937) was a Russian revolutionary, party and statesman, lawyer, Member of the RSDLP since 1898, Minister of Labor in the Government of the Transcaucasian Democratic Federative Republic.

== Biography ==
Born into the family of the abbot of the Haghpat Monastery, Harutyun Ter-Erzinkyan. He studied at the Nersessian Seminary in Tiflis and graduated from the Faculty of Law of the University of Geneva (Switzerland).

He was a voting delegate at the V Congress of the RSDLP in London (1907). In 1912 he was arrested.

Since 1917, in party, state, and Soviet work.

The collaboration of Aramais Yerznkyan with academician of architecture Alexander Tamanyan during the difficult years of socialist construction in the 1930s made it possible to implement grandiose projects for the reconstruction of Yerevan, in particular, the construction of the building of the Yerevan Opera and Ballet.

== Literature ==
- Erzinkyan, Aramais L., Petrosyan, Vladimir Aramais Erzinkyan. Personality is a legend: (Collection of articles and materials) Yerevan: Zangak-97, 2002. 158 p.
