= Robert Nazaryan =

Armenian politician (1956–2026)

- Ռոբերտ Նազարյան

Mayor of Yerevan
- In office 11 January 2001 – 30 June 2003
- Preceded by: Albert Bazeyan
- Succeeded by: Yervand Zakharyan

Minister of Transport and Communications
- In office February – May 2000
- President: Robert Kocharyan
- Preceded by: Yervand Zakharyan

Personal details
- Born: 26 June 1956 Yerevan, Armenian SSR, USSR
- Died: 26 January 2026 (aged 69) Yerevan, Armenia
- Occupation: Politician

Robert Nazaryan (Armenian: Ռոբերտ Նիկոլայի Նազարյան; 26 June 1956 – 26 January 2026) was an Armenian politician who was mayor of Yerevan from 2001 to 2003.

== Biography ==
From 2012, Nazaryan worked as the chief of the Public Services Regulatory Commission of Armenia. Nazaryan was a deputy energy minister from 1997 to 2000, minister of transport and communications (2000). As of 2018, he was the chief of Public Services Regulatory Commission.

In July 2013, President Serzh Sargsyan re-appointed him as chief of Public Services Regulatory Commission for another five years.

Nazaryan died on 26 January 2026, at the age of 69.

== See also ==
- List of mayors of Yerevan

Preceded by Albert Bazeyan	Mayor of Yerevan; 2001–2003	Succeeded by Yervand Zakharyan
