= Hovhannes Ghorghanyan =

Russian-Armenian economist (b.1833)

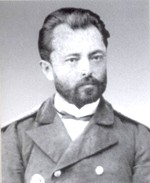

1st Mayor of Yerevan
- In office 1879–1884
- Succeeded by: Barsegh Gueghanyan

Personal details
- Born: 1833 Tiflis
- Died: Unknown

Hovhannes Korganyan/Ghorghanyan (Armenian: Հովհաննես Ղորղանյան; 1833–?) was a Russian-Armenian economist who served as the first mayor of Yerevan from 1879 to 1884.

== Biography ==
Hovhannes Korganyan/Ghorghanyan, a Russian-Armenian economist, was born in 1833 in Tiflis to a family of hereditary aristocrats. He graduated from the Tiflis Real Gymnasium. Starting in 1854, he worked in public service. Initially, he served in Tiflis, but later moved to Yerevan, where he secured a position at the district school of the Caucasus educational district. This school was eventually transformed into a classical gymnasium. At the pro-gymnasium, Korganyan/Ghorghanyan worked as a trustee and later became a teacher in 1885.

Simultaneously, Korganyan/Ghorganyan held responsible positions in the office of the military governor of Yerevan. He received the degree of state counselor. In 1877, by decree of the governor of the Caucasus, Hovhannes Korganyan/Ghorganyan was appointed head of the city government of Yerevan. He served as the mayor of Yerevan from October 1879 until September 1884.

== Awards ==
- Order of St. Anne, 3rd degree
- Order of St. Stanislaus, 2nd class
- Order of St. Stanislaus, 3rd degree
- Crimean War medals
