= Rafael Ghazaryan =

Rafael Ghazaryan (Armenian: Ռաֆայել Ղազարյան, 26 January 1924 – 3 November 2007, Yerevan) was an Armenian radio-physicist, academician, public activist, a member of Karabakh Committee.

Ghazaryan was a World War II veteran. He is an author of a number of works on radiophysics, laser atmosphere technics and light modulation, a member of the National Academy of Sciences of Armenia. He was the founder of laser technics cafetras at Yerevan State University and Yerevan Polytechnic Institute. In 1988, along with other members of Karabakh Committee, he was arrested by Soviet authorities.

In 1989, he became the Vice President of the Supreme Council (parliament) of Armenian SSR, in 1990-95 he headed the parliamentarian Committee of Science and Education. He was also the director of Engineering Center "Mashtots".

In his final years, he was one of the leaders of the “Intellectual Forum” (Armenia).
