= 1990 Armenian Supreme Soviet election =

Parliamentary elections were held in the Armenian SSR on 20 May 1990, with further rounds held on 3 June and 15 July due to low turnouts invalidating earlier results. By 21 July, 64 seats were still unfilled, with 16 still unfilled in February the following year. The result was a victory for the Communist Party of Armenia, which won 136 of the 259 seats. The remaining candidates were all officially independents, but almost all were members of the Pan-Armenian National Movement. Overall voter turnout was 60%.

== Results ==
Party	Votes	%	Seats
Communist Party of Armenia			136
Independents			59
Vacant			64
Total			259
Total votes	1,286,464	–	
Registered voters/turnout	2,137,210	60.19	
Source: Nohlen et al.
