= Lanjaghbyur =

Village in Gegharkunik, Armenia

Lanjaghbyur Լանջաղբյուր
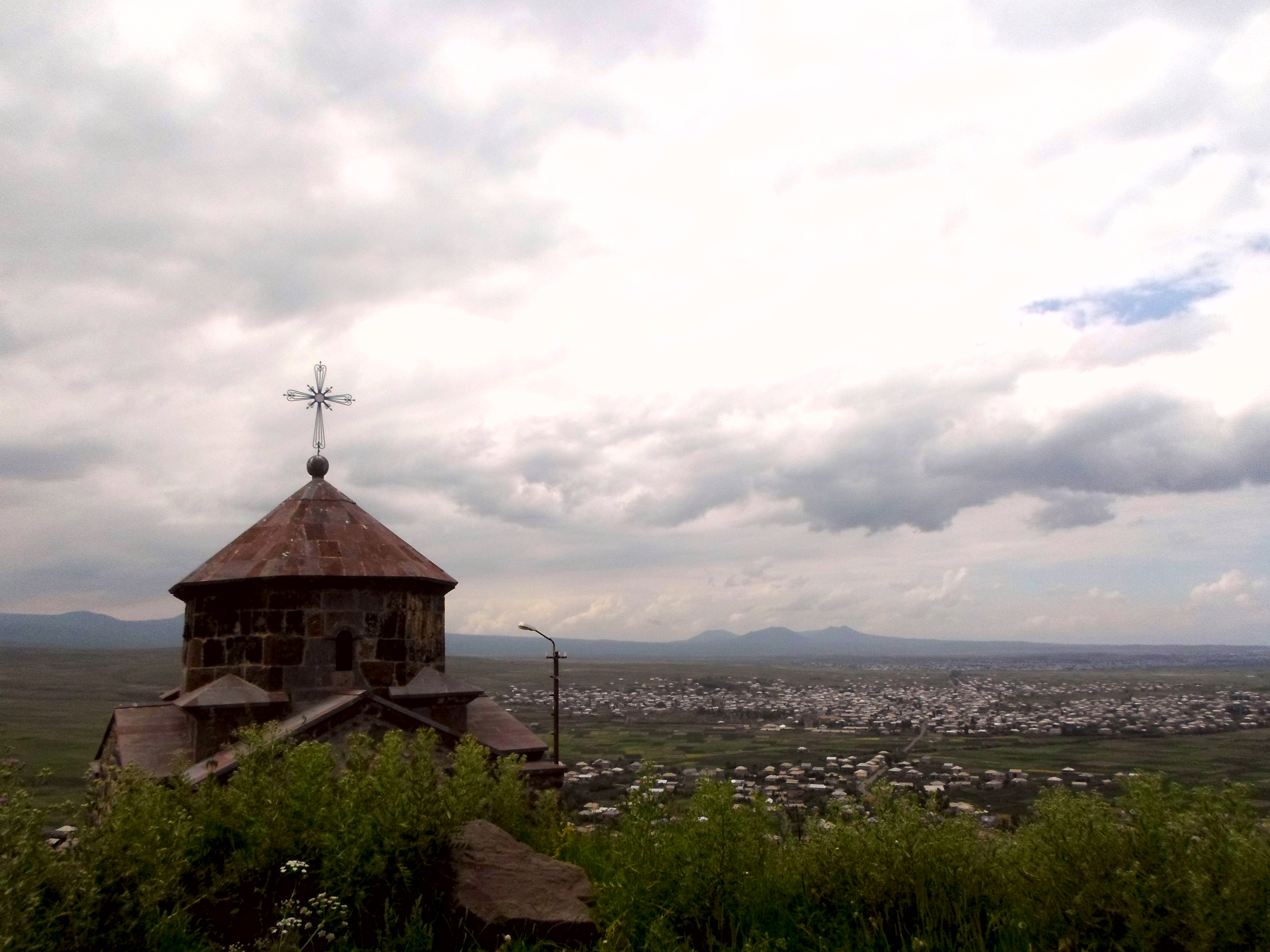
- A view of Lanjaghbyur and Ilikavank Monastery

- Location within Armenia Location within Gegharkunik
- Coordinates: 40°16′23″N 45°08′40″E
- Country: Armenia
- Province: Gegharkunik
- Municipality: Gavar
- Founded: 1828

Population (2011)
  - Total: 2,115
- Time zone: UTC+4 (AMT)

Lanjaghbyur (Armenian: Լանջաղբյուր) is a village in the Gavar Municipality of the Gegharkunik Province of Armenia.

== History ==
The village was founded in 1828.

== Gallery ==
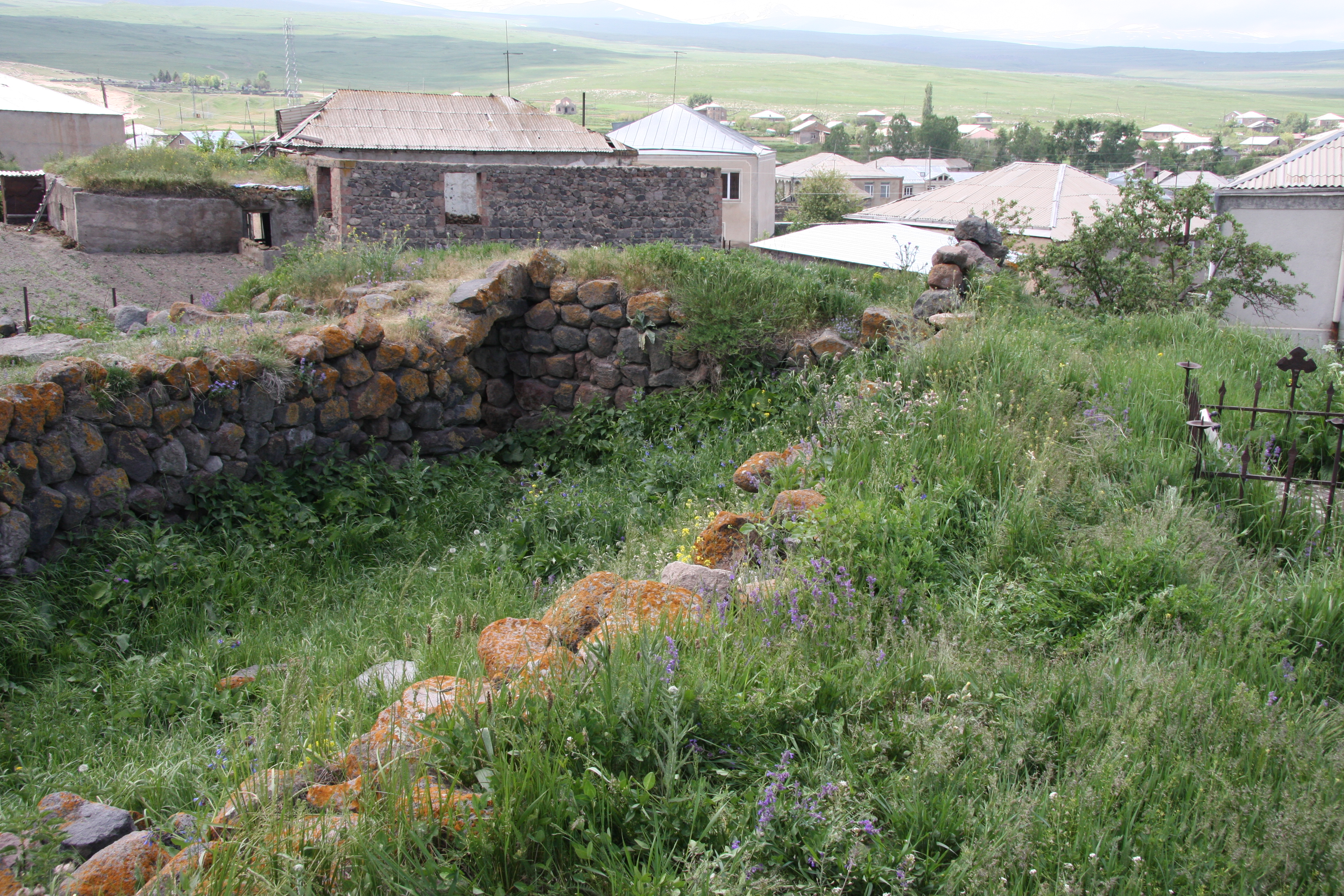
A view of Lanjaghbyur from Surb Khach Church

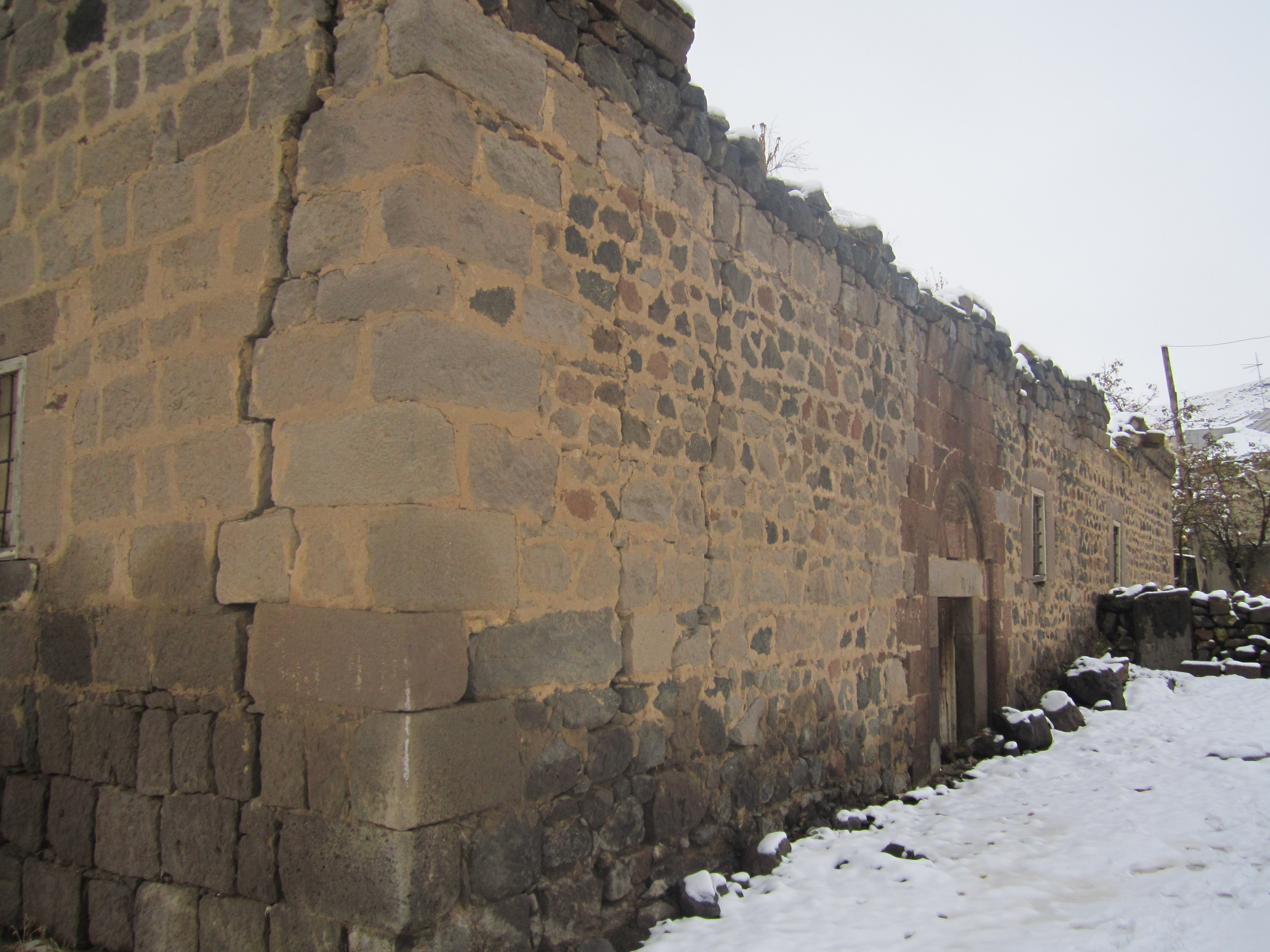
Surb Khach Church

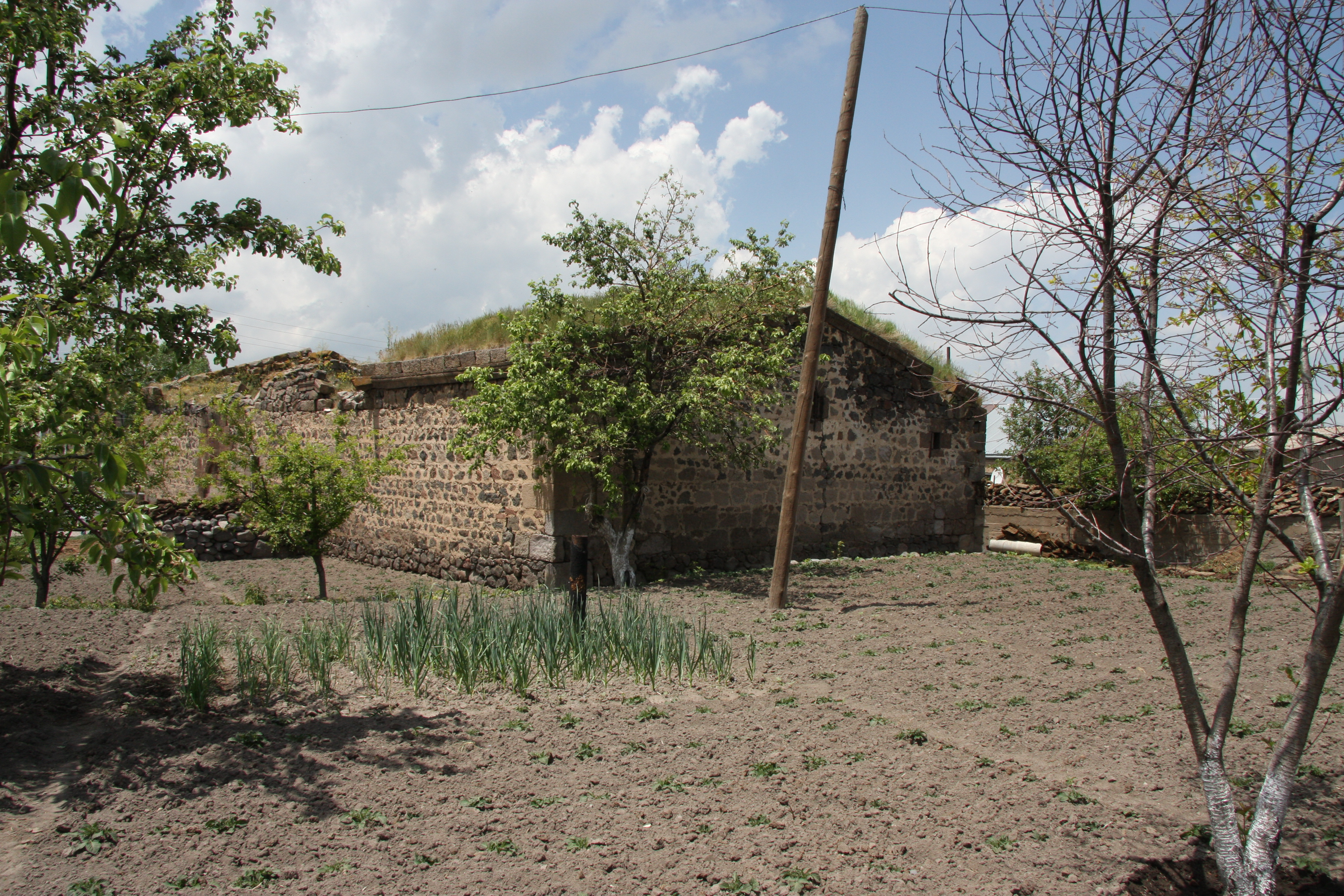
Surb Khach Church

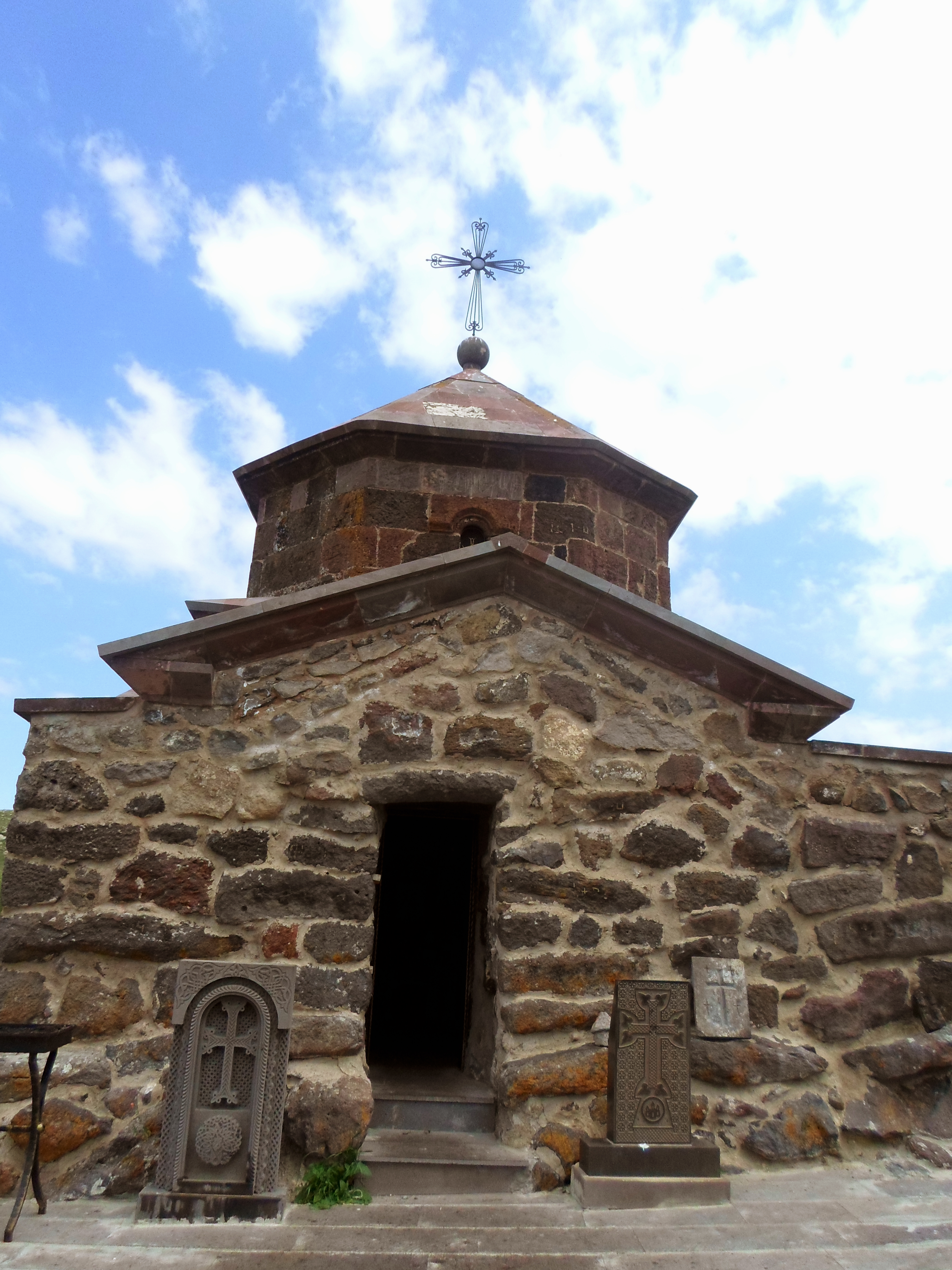
Ilikavank Monastery

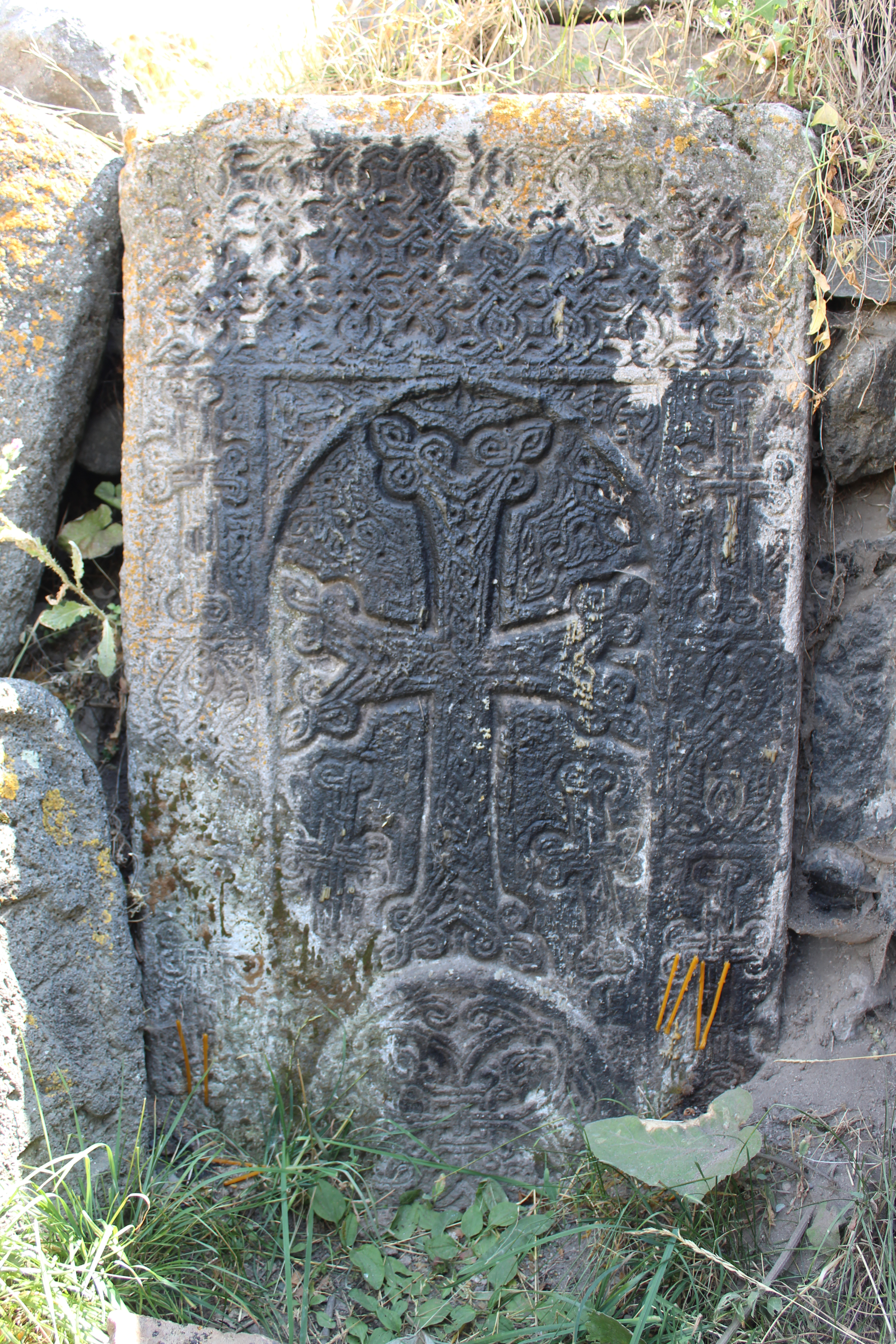
Khachkar near St. Hakob Church
