= Karabakh Committee =

Group of Armenian intellectuals

Karabakh Committee (Armenian: Ղարաբաղ կոմիտե) was a group of Armenian intellectuals recognized by many Armenians as the de facto leaders in the late 1980s. The committee was formed in 1988, with the stated objective of reunification of Nagorno-Karabakh with Armenia. The committee was arrested by Soviet authorities on 11 December 1988 on charges of obstructing humanitarian aid from Azerbaijan after the December 7 1988 Armenian earthquake, but were released on 31 May 1989, subsequently forming the Pan-Armenian National Movement. In 1990 The New York Times described the committee as "the most influential nationalist group in Armenia."

== Members ==
- Levon Ter-Petrosyan
- Vazgen Manukyan
- Babken Ararktsyan
- Ashot Manucharyan
- Vano Siradeghyan
- Rafael Ghazaryan
- Samson Ghazaryan
- Hambartsum Galstyan
- Aleksan Hakobyan
- Davit Vardanyan
- Samvel Gevorgyan
