= Ashot Bleyan =

Armenian politician

Ashot Shamkhali Bleyan (in Armenian Աշոտ Բլեյան, born in Yerevan, Armenian Soviet Socialist Republic on 4 September 1955), is an Armenian politician, educator, government minister and school master.

== Biography ==
Bleyan graduated from Yerevan State University as a physicist. Together with Ashot Dabaghyan and Ashot Manucharyan, he co-founded School No. 183 now known as Mkhitar Sebastatsi Educational Complex in Yerevan, Armenia. Bleyan became the director of the school in 1989. After serving as vice president in the Yerevan Municipality's Executive Committee, he was elected to the Armenian Parliament in 1990.

He was appointed Armenian Education Minister serving 1994 to 1995 in the government headed by Prime Minister Hrant Bagratyan. He became Vice Minister for the Ministry of Education and Science from 1995 to 1996.

Between 1994 and 2002, he served as president of the New Path (in Armenian «Նոր ուղի») political party. In 1998 he was a candidate to the Armenian presidential elections gaining just 1,559 votes (or 0.1% of the total votes). He was imprisoned in 1999 (the charges were: civil and criminal offences, including embezzlement). His lawyer complained to the European Parliament that he has been beaten and placed in solitary confinement.
