= Ashot Manucharyan =

Armenian politician (born 1954)

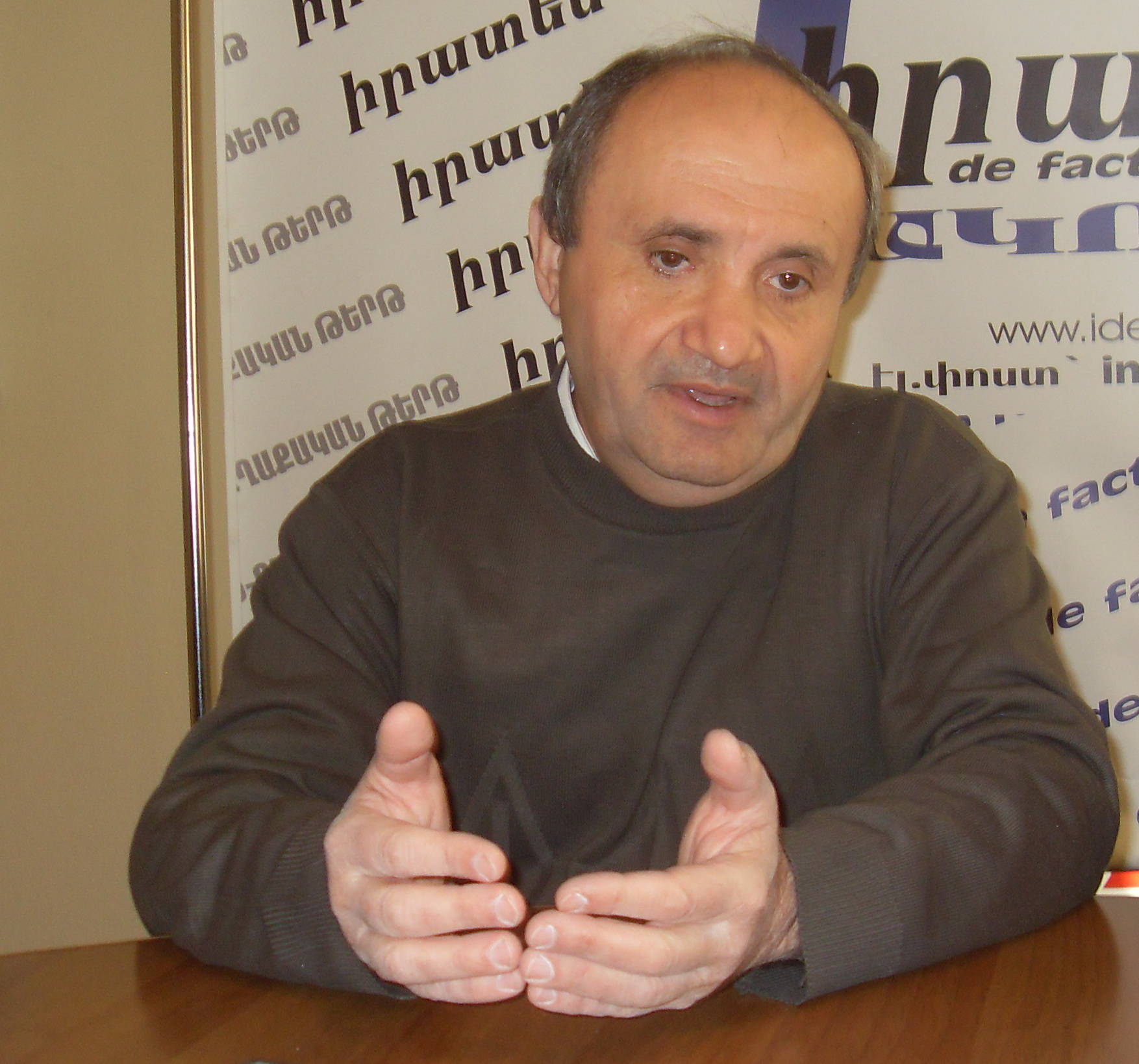
Ashot Manucharyan

Ashot Manucharyan (Armenian: Աշոտ Մանուչարյան, born 1954 in Yerevan) is an Armenian educator, democratic socialist politician, and one of the founding members of the Karabakh Committee. After the independence of Armenia from the Soviet Union in 1991, he served as Minister of Internal Affairs from 1991 to 1992 and as Levon Ter-Petrosyan's Secretary of the Security Council until 1993. Together with Ashot Dabaghyan and Ashot Bleyan, Manucharyan co-founded School No. 183, later known as the Mkhitar Sebastatsi Educational Complex, which stresses a humanistic approach to education.
