= Pan-Armenian National Movement =

Armenian political party

Pan-Armenian National Movement Հայոց Համազգային Շարժում
- Abbreviation: ՀՀՇ
- Leader: Aram Manukyan (last)
- Spokesperson: Alexander Arzumanyan
- Founded: 20 February 1988
- Dissolved: 13 April 2013
- Succeeded by: Armenian National Congress; Armenian National Movement Party
- Headquarters: Yerevan
- Membership: 10,000 (1996)
- Ideology: Liberal democracy Liberal nationalism Anti-communism
- Political position: Centre to center-right
- European affiliation: Alliance of Liberals and Democrats for Europe Party
- National Assembly (2012): 1 / 131

Website
- www.anm.am

The Pan-Armenian National Movement or Armenian All-national Movement (Armenian: Հայոց Համազգային Շարժում, romanized: Hayots Hamazgain Sharzhum; HHSh) was a political party in Armenia.

== History ==
The party emerged from the resolution of the Nagorno-Karabakh Autonomous Council of 20 February 1988, to unite with Soviet Armenia. Its first meetings, which demanded reunification of Nagorno-Karabakh with Armenia, were held in Yerevan on 21 February 1988. Its ruling committee led by Igor Muradyan was organized in the same month, and Levon Ter-Petrossian was incorporated into the ruling body in May 1988. On 15 June 1988, with representation of the movement in the Supreme Council, this body adopted a resolution on reunification of the two national units. PANM participated in the 1990 Armenian Supreme Soviet elections, gaining 59 seats in Parliament.

The party nominated Ter-Petrossian as their candidate in the 1991 Armenian presidential election. Ter-Petrossian won the election, securing 83% of the vote. The party once again nominated Ter-Petrossian as their candidate in the 1996 Armenian presidential election, he won with 51.3% of the vote. The party eventually lost significance when Ter-Petrossian resigned as president in 1998. The party lost all its representation in the National Assembly following the 1999 Armenian parliamentary election, losing 62 seats.

Since 2010, the party had been a member of the Alliance of Liberals and Democrats for Europe Party (ALDE Party).

The party participated in the 2012 Armenian parliamentary election and won only one seat in the National Assembly.

== Activities ==
In July 2012, the party participated in a forum of liberal parties from the Caucasus region. The forum included the Republican Party of Georgia and the Musavat party. Issues of joint regional cooperation, as well as, issues of integration into European structures was discussed.

== Dissolution and successor parties ==
The Pan-Armenian National Movement was last led by Aram Manukyan and the party officially dissolved in 2013.

The Pan-Armenian National Movement spearheaded the formation of Armenian National Congress, a diverse coalition of several Armenian opposition parties, headed by Levon Ter-Petrossian in opposition to the ruling governmental coalition headed by former Armenian President Serzh Sargsyan.

The Armenian National Movement Party (ANM) also traces its early history to the Pan-Armenian National Movement, with Ararat Zurabyan currently leading the ANM.

== See also ==
- Karabakh Committee
- Programs of political parties in Armenia
