= Premiership of Nikol Pashinyan =

Governance of Armenia, 2018–

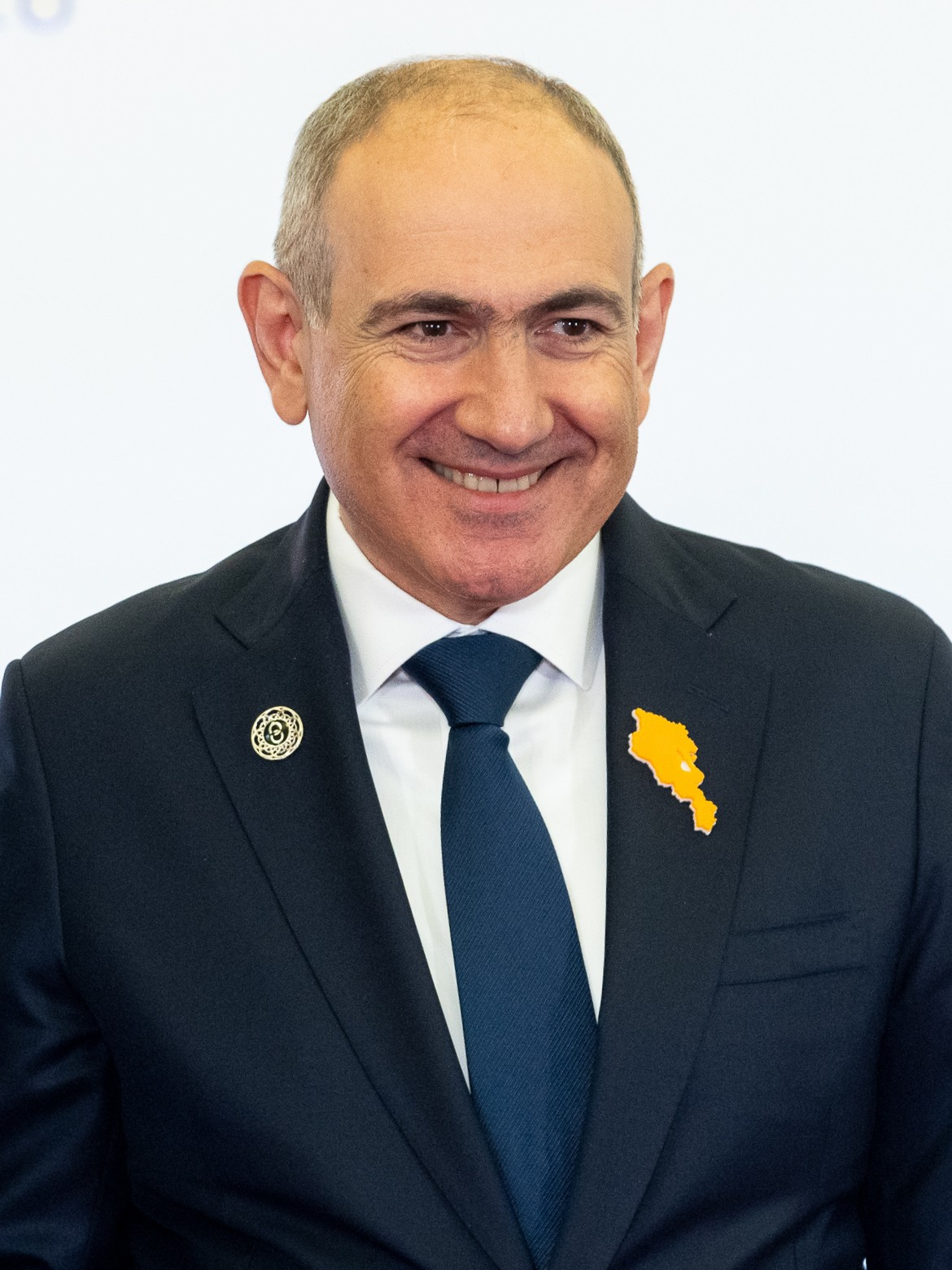
- Premiership of Nikol Pashinyan; May 8, 2018 – present
- Prime Minister: Nikol Pashinyan
- Cabinet: First Pashinyan government Second Pashinyan government Third Pashinyan government Fourth Pashinyan government
- Party: My Step Alliance
- Election: 2018; 2021; 2026
- Appointed by: Armen Sarkissian
- Seat: Office of the Prime Minister of Armenia

The premiership of Nikol Pashinyan began on May 8, 2018, when Nikol Pashinyan was elected in a 59–42 vote by the National Assembly of Armenia to be the 16th Prime Minister of Armenia. Following the resignation of Serzh Sargsyan on April 23 due to mass protests in the country, Pashinyan was seen by the demonstrators as the best possible successor that has no ties to the previous government. His nomination was contested by the republican majority during a vote on May 1, but was finally accepted during a second hearing a week later.

== Background ==
Pashinyan arrived to power as the main leader of the 2018 waves of mass protests in Armenia. The movement started in late March 2018 to dissuade outgoing president Serj Sargsyan from wanting to become prime minister. After Sargsyan was nominated by the Republican Party of Armenia to be their candidate for prime minister, the protests expanded to the whole country, and even in some cities where there is an Armenian Diaspora presence.

After getting elected, Pashinyan promised to make swift changes to the country's economy and to crack down on corruption.

== Election and formation of the first cabinet ==
Pashinyan's party, Way Out Alliance, made a deal with the two other opposition parties in parliament, the Armenian Revolutionary Federation(ARF) and the Prosperous Armenia party, to have a minority coalition government. The first post-revolution cabinet was formed on May 12, 2018, and consisted of 17 ministries, 2 of which are administered by the ARF and 4 by Prosperous Armenia. Pashinyan also appointed a new police commissioner, National Security Service director, and head investigator for the State Inspection Service.

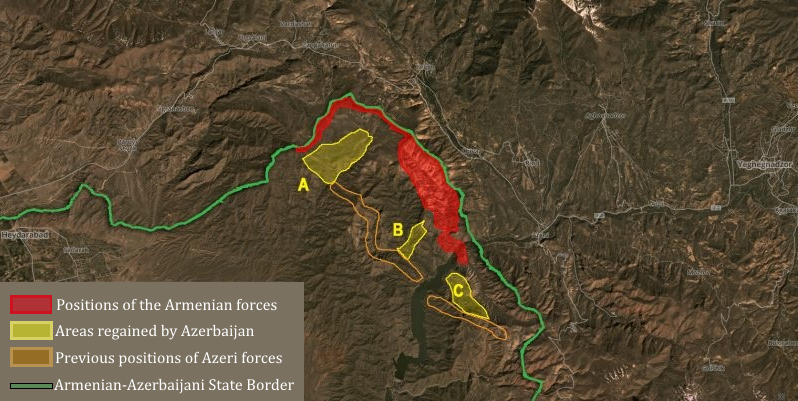
Situation on the Gyunnyut-Areni section of the Armenia-Nakhichevan border after the May 2018 clashes.

Pashinyan was soon criticized for letting Azerbaijan make territorial gains on the Armenia-Nakhichevan border during the first weeks of his premiership. Despite not losing any ground to Azerbaijani troops, the Armenian units in the area have to deal with an enemy that is significantly closer to their positions and now has a view on the nearby village of Areni. After meeting during a CIS summit in Dushanbe, Pashinyan and Ilham Aliyev agreed to calm the situation on the border.

In July, the government started an anti-corruption crackdown against former officials and politicians. These include retired general Manvel Grigoryan, CSTO Secretary-General Yuri Khatchaturov, and former President Robert Kocharyan. While Grigoryan's and Kocharyan's arrests were seen as signs of the new government's will to fight against corruption, accusations against Khatchaturov were seen as a foreign policy failure, because of his important position in the military alliance.

Pashinyan, along with President Armen Sarkissian, attended the funeral of world-renowned French singer Charles Aznavour. Armenia was the host of the 17th Francophonie Summit that was held in Yerevan on October 11–12. During the summit, he gave several speeches in French.

After its two coalition partners, the ARF and Prosperous Armenia, supported a bill which will make it harder for the Prime Minister to call snap elections to the National Assembly, Pashinyan fired all six of their ministers in a cabinet reshuffle. Two weeks later, he resigned from his post, became acting prime minister, and demanded to the people on his Facebook page to block the gates of the National Assembly, so that its members can't come and vote for another candidate. This forced the electoral commission to call new parliamentary elections.

The 2018 Armenian parliamentary election took place on December 9, 2018, with 11 parties running for seats in the National Assembly. Pashinyan's party, My Step Alliance, garnished a majority of the vote, with 88 out of 132 seats. Prosperous Armenia won 26 seats, and Bright Armenia, led by Pashinyan's former ally Edmon Marukyan, won 18 seats. There was no large incident during the election, although there were reports of intimidation and collusion in favor of the My Step Alliance.

== Formation of the second cabinet ==
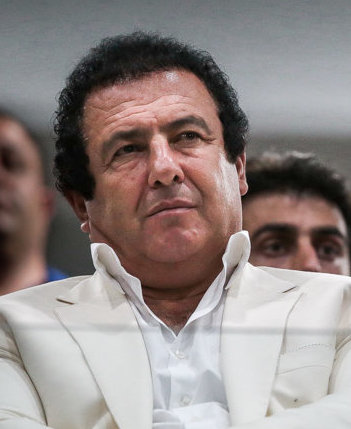
Gagik Tsarukyan's party became the main parliamentary opposition to the new authorities. He would be arrested just days after describing the government's response to the pandemic as 'inefficient'.

After its election victory, Pashinyan formed a new government on January 14 consisting exclusively of members of his party and independent officials. He started talking about reducing the size of his cabinet. As a result of this restructure, 5 ministries were to be disbanded and combined with other ones to simplify government bureaucracy. The final model was proposed on February 1 and was approved by the parliament on March 8.

Armenia had its first case of COVID-19 on March 1, 2020. Pashinyan initially downplayed the disease and said that there was no need for a nationwide confinement. As Armenia's numbers began to have more and more cases, the Government declared a state of emergency on March 16 lasting until April 14, to prevent the spread of the coronavirus. Schools were ordered to close, gatherings with over 20 people were banned, and the 2020 Armenian constitutional referendum, one of Pashinyan's main objectives after the 2019 election, was postponed. The state of emergency was later extended until May 4.

On May 4, the national stay-at-home order was partially lifted and non-essential businesses were allowed to reopen, provided that the businesses require customers wear masks and limit the number of customers inside stores and restaurants. Because a large number of people didn't respect the social distancing rules, Armenia saw an explosion of coronavirus cases and on May 14, the Government reinstated the state of emergency and called everyone to respect the rules. Even after this call, some people dismissed the government's orders. On June 1, Pashinyan said via Facebook that he had contracted the virus, along with the rest of his family, although a few days later he said that he no longer has it, suggesting that it might have been made up. He ordered the police to fine anyone that is not respecting the rules set by the government and called for people to send him pictures of rule breakers to post it on his Facebook page.

Pashinyan's handling of the pandemic was harshly criticized by opposition parties, including its former coalition partners, the ARF and Prosperous Armenia. After opposition leader and millionaire Gagik Tsarukyan said that the government's response to the COVID-19 pandemic was inadequate, National Security Service investigators raided his house in what was seen as a crackdown on the opposition.

On June 23, the My Step faction of the parliament unanimously voted to approve the amendments that will require the head of the constitutional court, Hrayr Tovmasyan, to step down. The law was signed by the President the same evening. Opposition parties declared the legislation unconstitutional because the National Assembly does not have the power to change the constitution; It has to be done thought a referendum.

== Popular support ==
Initially part of a party that garnered less than 10% of the votes during the 2017 Armenian parliamentary election, Pashinyan enjoyed near-total support following the velvet revolution. An opinion poll from early May indicated that 98% of respondents had a positive view of the movement that brought him to power. According to the same poll, his party would win a super-majority if parliamentary elections were held then, with some 75% of respondents saying they would vote for Way Out.

The first real test of the popularity of Pashiyan was during the 2018 Yerevan City Council election, where the newly formed My Step Alliance candidate, former actor and comedian Hayk Marutyan, got more than 81% of the vote and won 57 out of 65 seats in the city council. Marutyan was endorsed by Pashinyan, who made multiple appearances during the electoral campaign.

The 2018 Armenian parliamentary election was a turning point for Pashinyan. His party got more than 70% of the vote and won 88 out of 132 seats in the National Assembly. Both the Republican Party of Armenia and the Armenian Revolutionary Federation became extra-parliamentary parties, while Gagik Tsarukyan's Prosperous Armenia lost 5 seats and became the main parliamentary opposition party. The third party in parliament, Bright Armenia, is led by Pashinyan's former ally, Edmon Marukyan.

A year after Pashinyan took office, an International Republican Institute poll shows that the level of support towards the new leader is declining. While in October 2018, the amount of support towards the change of government was viewed positively by 82% of respondents, in May 2019 it got down to 69%. A Gallup (company) poll in December 2019 showed that the approval rating of Pashinyan party got down at 61%, while another poll made by a local outlet showed 45%.

The Armenian Government's handling of the COVID-19 pandemic may drop Pashinyan's approval rating even further, although no polls were conducted because of the pandemic.

=== Social media presence ===
Nikol Pashinyan is the first Armenian Premier to use social media as a means of communication. He has Twitter, Facebook, and Instagram official accounts. His Facebook account is by far the most popular, with more than 800 000 followers. He was mentioned on the 2019 top-10 list of world leaders with the most interactions on Facebook.

== Resignation ==
On Sunday 25th of April 2021, Pashinyan announced his resignation from the post of Prime Minister of Armenia, to allow snap parliamentary elections in June of the same year. He will fulfil his duties of interim prime minister, until the new prime minister steps into office; that is, of course, if Pashinyan loses the elections and another candidate gets elected.

== Domestic Policy ==
=== Economy ===
Economic policies

The main problem the new government had to deal with was reduced growth and a decrease in Foreign direct investments after a years of economic successes during Pashinyan's predecessor, Karen Karapetyan's time in office. In 2017, Armenia's GDP grew by 7.5%, while in 2018 it only grew by 5.2% (most of the growth was registered during the period from January to March). By 2019, the trend was reversed and the country saw a 7.6% GDP growth.

In September 2018, Pashinyan proposed a change in the taxation policy. Tax brackets would be eliminated and a 23% flat tax would be used instead. Each year, the amount that is taxed would be reduced by 0.5% until it reaches 20%. The move was heavily criticized by the Armenian Revolutionary Federation (Armenia's biggest socialist party), because it will create a greater gap between the country's richest and poorest citizens. Nevertheless, the move was approved by the parliament in June 2019 and came into force in 2020.

According to political scientist Michael Zoian, "Pashinyan does not have a very transparent economic program, and does not know exactly which model he will adopt. A liberal model with some social guarantees is the most likely. He talks a lot about inequalities." Other analysts have also characterized him as a neoliberal politician with no real plan of action.

=== Social issues ===
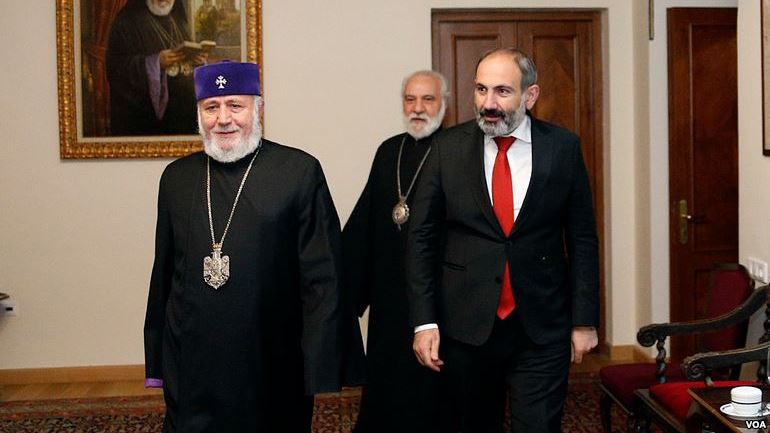
Pashinyan and Catholicos Karekin II, December 2018

Relations with the Armenian Apostolic Church

During protests against Catholicos Karekin II, Pashinyan has stated that his government will not interfere in church matters and that the state and church are separate in Armenia. He further stated that he wants the church to have dignity and a good reputation and that his government does not use the church for its political interests. At another rally, Pashinyan embraced Catholic and Evangelical Armenians and stated that Armenians should stay true to their Christian roots and reject "totalitarian sects, which deprive people of freedom and autonomy."

In June 2025 Pashinyan began an open conflict with the Armenian Apostolic Church, calling for the removal of Catholicos of All Armenians Karekin II and the reorganization of the Mother See of Holy Etchmiadzin. He accused Karekin II of violating his celibacy vows, and when businessman Samvel Karapetyan publicly defended the Church, he was targeted by Pashinyan. Karapetyan was arrested on 18 June 2025 for making public calls to usurp power, violating Part 2 of Article 422 of Armenia’s Criminal Code. Pashinyan stated that it was "likely" that the Russian government was using Karapetyan to wage a "hybrid operation" in the "hybrid war" against the Armenian government, and trying to find a "Ivanishvili 2.0" for Armenia. A week later, primate Bagrat Galstanyan was also arrested in connections to plotting a coup to overthrow Pashinyan 's government with a group of ~1,000 ex-military and police loyal to him.

LGBT rights

Pashinyan and his government usually avoid to voice an opinion on LGBT rights in Armenia, despite his embrace of human rights, including LGBT rights. Despite this denial, his government is known for being pro-LGBT.

Healthcare

During Pashinyan's first year in office, the government made healthcare free for all citizens under the age of 18.

A nationwide scandal erupted in December 2019: Doctors and healthcare workers were taking newborn babies from their parents, either by blackmailing them or by telling them that the infant didn't survive. The babies were then smuggled out of the country and sold via an international black adoption market. The scandal involved Armenia's chief gynaecologist, several doctors and health workers, along with immigration and customs employees. Pashinyan promised to bring to justice anyone involved in this scheme.

== Foreign policy ==
=== Defence ===
Pashinyan has been heavily criticized by his opponents for being a draft evader and an anti-military activist. Nevertheless, he has advocated for a strong army and a bigger defense budget after getting elected. To help him in doing these changes, he choose Davit Tonoyan, an experienced defense official and war veteran, as Defence minister of Armenia.

The new leadership was criticized for not answering to Azerbaijani provocations and advances on the Armenia-Nakhichevan border in May 2018. After meeting during a CIS summit in Dushanbe, Pashinyan and Ilham Aliyev agreed to calm the situation on the border.

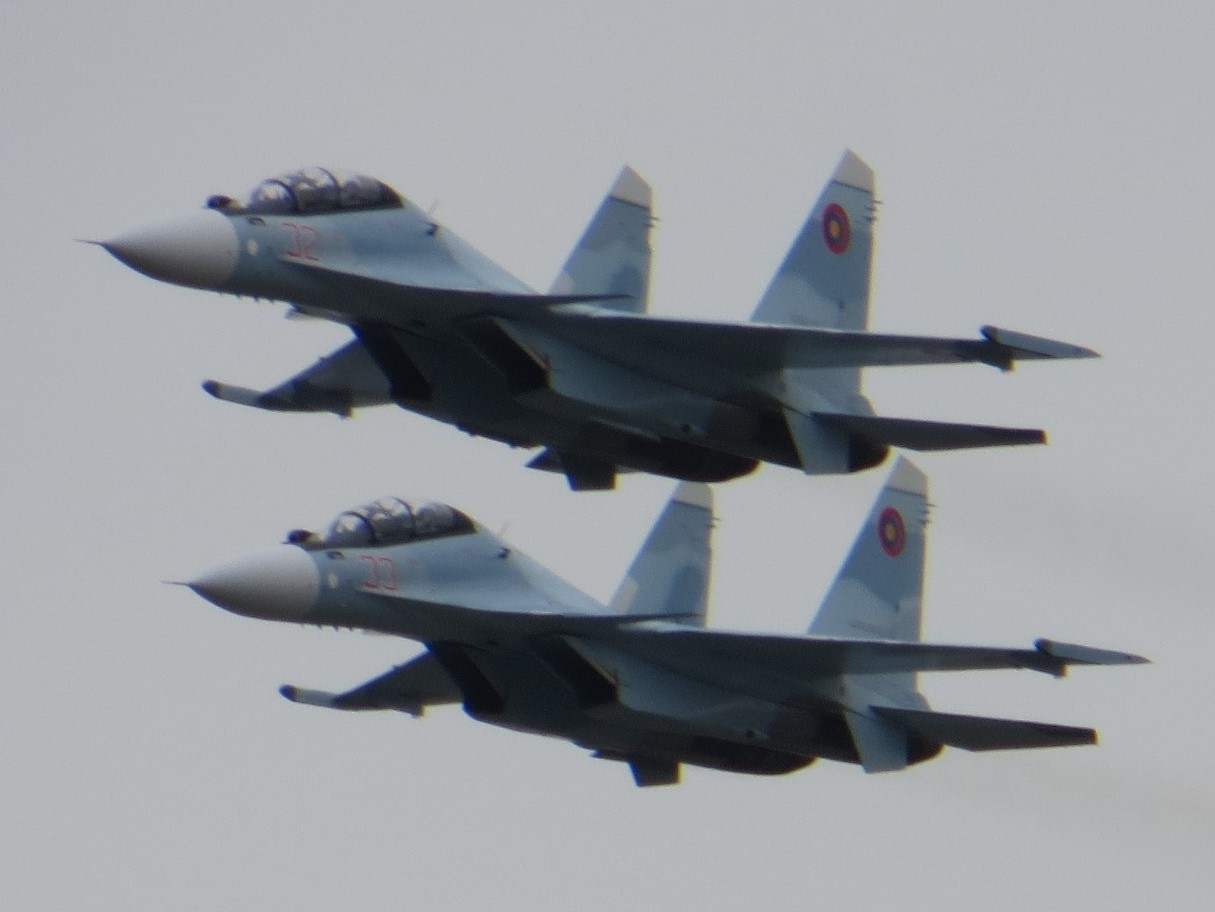
Armenian Air Force's Sukhoi jets flying on Victory Day 2020.

Pashinyan claimed in 2020 that 'large quantities of military equipment were bought during the last 2 years.' The only purchase made public was the order of four Su-30SMs in February 2019. The aircraft were delivered in late December 2019, ahead of schedule.

One of the reforms instigated by Pashinyan was the implementation of a new base cafeteria system. In the previous system, food was given by military logistical units and military chefs. Under the new system, local private companies will organise the cafeteria of bases, while food supply in the field will be provided in the form of rations and field kitchens.

In 2019, Armenia sent a military contingent to Syria. The force consists of 83 medics, demining experts, force protection and other military personnel.

=== Artsakh ===
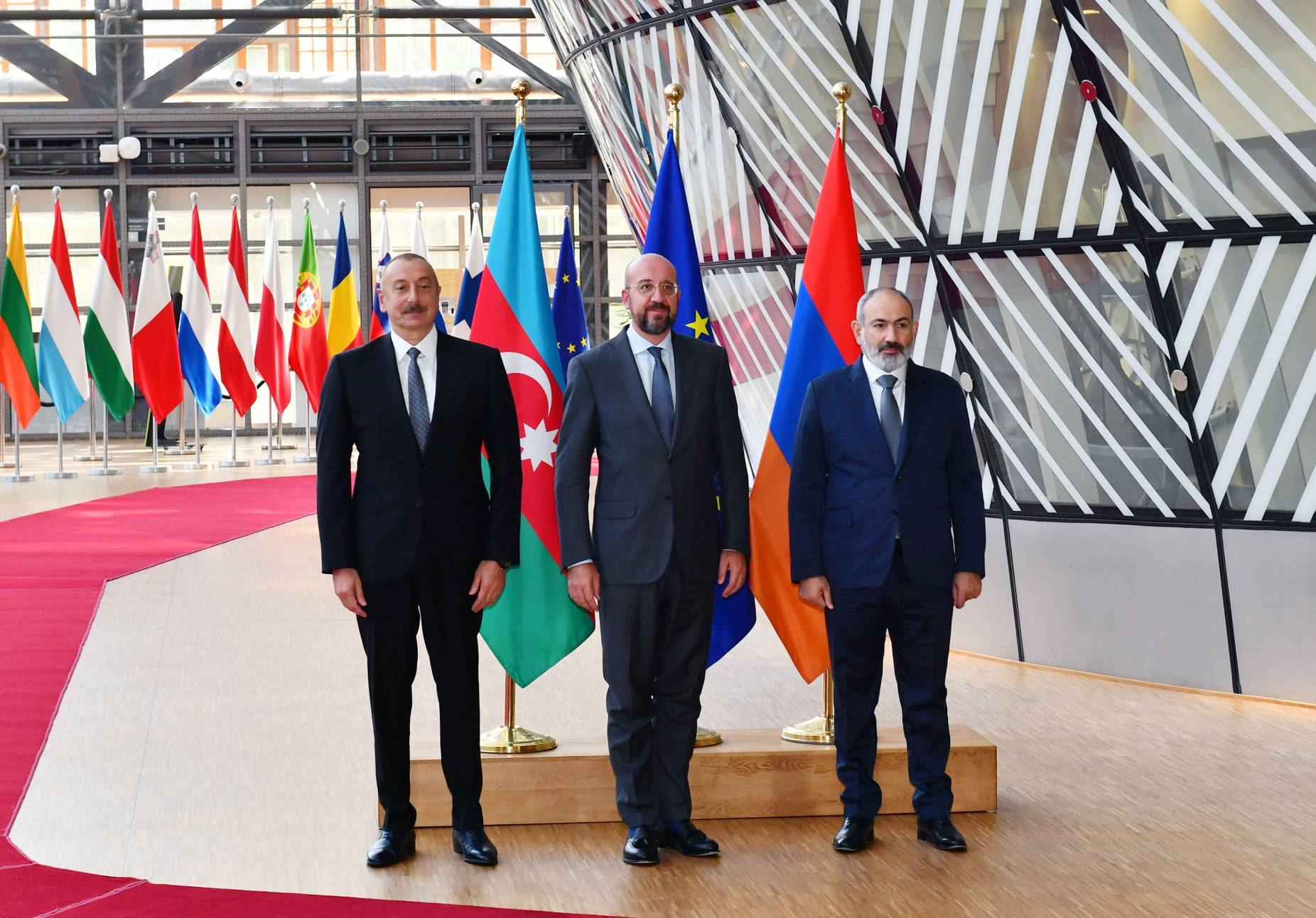
Pashinyan meeting with President of the European Council Charles Michel and Azerbaijani President Ilham Aliyev in Brussels on 31 August 2022

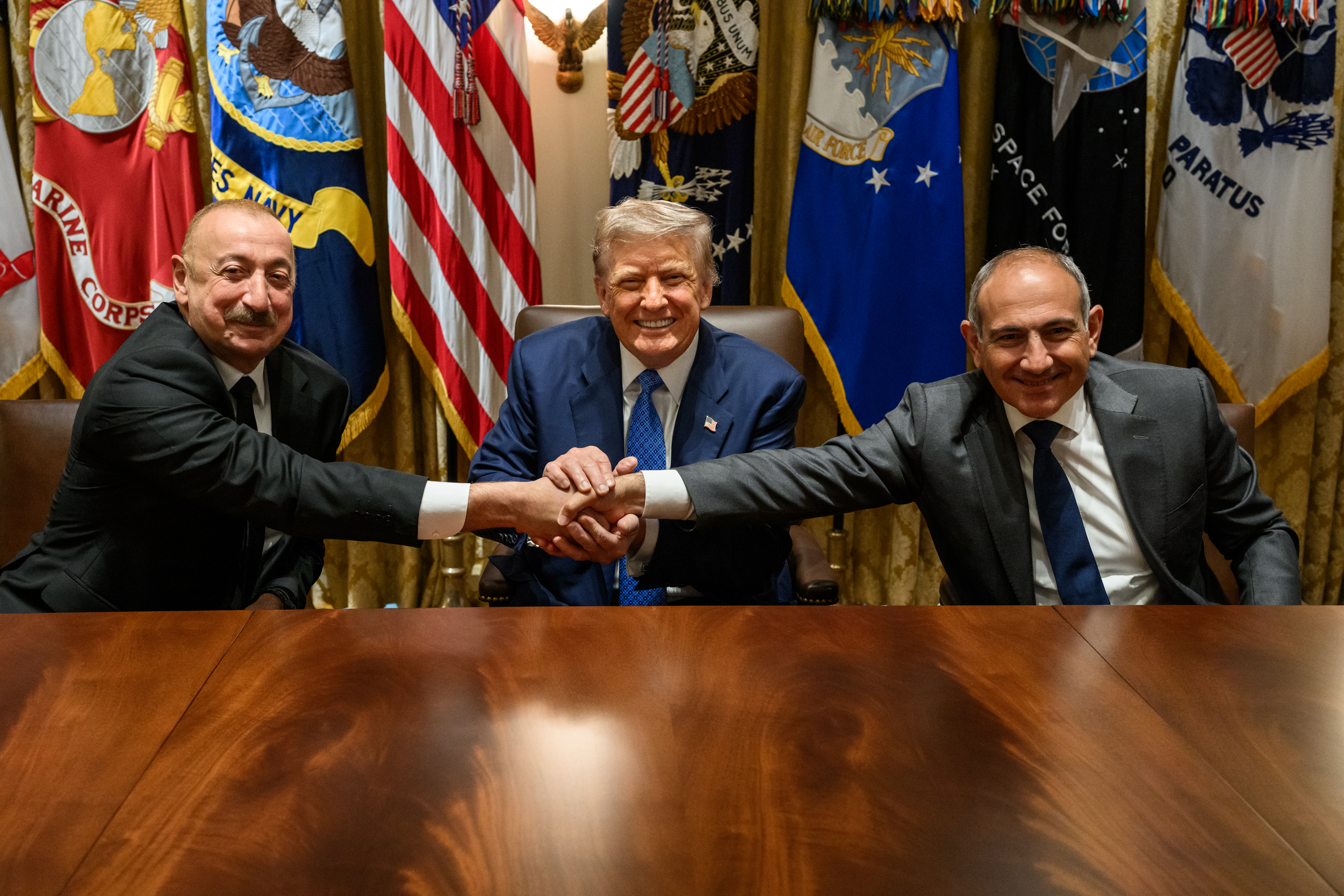
Pashinyan with U.S. President Donald Trump and Azerbaijani President Ilham Aliyev in Washington, D.C. 8 August 2025

In 2002, Pashinyan's Haykakan Zhamanak reprinted Levon Ter-Petrosyan's 1997 article titled "War or Peace" in which the latter argued for a compromised solution in the Karabakh conflict, which would include loss of control by Armenian forces of several occupied/liberated territories of Azerbaijan. After getting elected, Pashinyan adopted a hardline stance on the issue. He stated in a May 2018 interview: "It is impossible to talk about mutual concessions in the resolution of the conflict when Azerbaijan is trying to destroy the Armenian statehood. Negotiations on mutual concessions will begin only when Azerbaijan recognizes the right of the people of Karabakh to self-determination." Pashinyan visited Stepanakert on May 9, 2018, the day after his election as prime minister, to take part in celebrations of the Liberation of Shushi and Victory Day. He stated at a meeting with Artsakh President Bako Sahakyan: "I believe that the format of the negotiations is flawed as long as one of the sides of the conflict—the Artsakh leadership—is not a part of the negotiations." In January 2019 Pashinyan declared that "We can't even discuss the lands-for-peace formula."

=== European Union ===
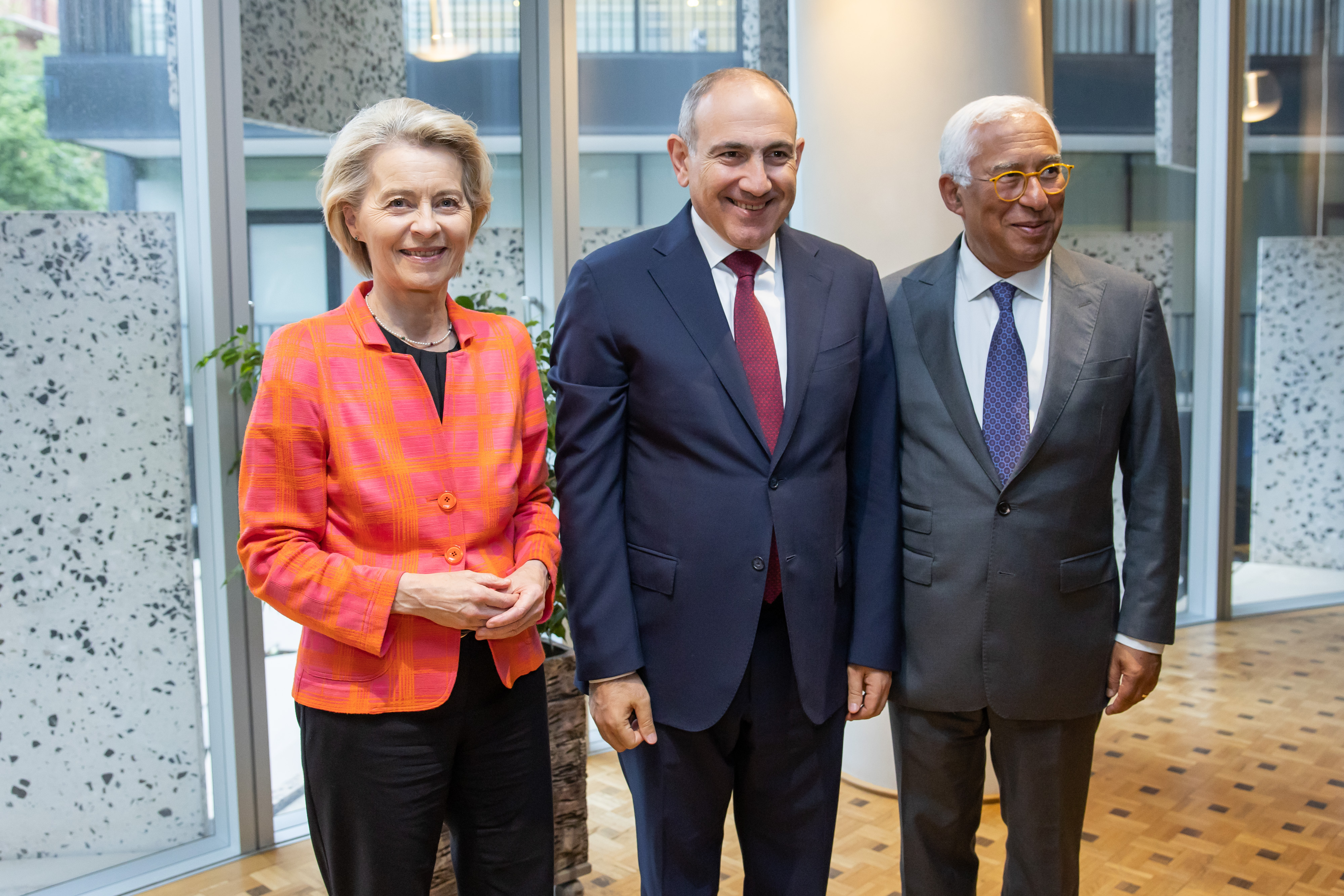
Pashinyan with President of the European Commission Ursula von der Leyen and President of the European Council António Costa on 6th European Political Community Summit in Tirana, 15 May 2025

On 31 August 2022, Pashinyan met with the President of the Council of the European Union, Charles Michel, in Brussels to discuss a peaceful resolution to the Armenia–Azerbaijan border crisis.

On 17 October 2023, Pashinyan addressed the European Parliament. Pashinyan stated, "On October 5 of this year, two extremely important documents for EU–Armenia relations were adopted in Granada. Both statements support the strengthening of EU–Armenia relations in all dimensions based on the needs of the Republic of Armenia" and "we are committed to further strengthen EU–Armenia relations. In the long term, the European Union and Armenia are determined to strengthen their economic ties by working to unlock the full potential of the Comprehensive and Enhanced Partnership Agreement. The Republic of Armenia is ready to be closer to the European Union, as much as the European Union considers it possible."

On 7 February 2023, during an address to the National Assembly, Pashinyan congratulated neighboring Georgia for obtaining EU candidate status. Pashinyan stated, "Many significant realities have changed in our region, and one of those realities is the fact that Georgia has received the status of a candidate for EU membership, which has an objective impact on our region. It turns out that two of our neighboring countries have the status of a candidate for EU membership, and if before it was possible to say, where is the EU, where is our region, now the EU is actually our region, and we are aware of this fact."

On 17 February 2023, Pashinyan met with European Commission President Ursula von der Leyen in Munich. The sides discussed various issues related to Armenia-European Union cooperation. The parties exchanged ideas on projects to be implemented in Armenia within the framework of the economic and investment plan of the Eastern Partnership.

In February 2023, Pashinyan announced support of the European Union Mission in Armenia (EUMA). According to Pashinyan, the mission became possible following negotiations held between Armenia, Azerbaijan, and the EU on the sidelines of the first European Political Community summit in Prague. On 4 May 2023, Nikol Pashinyan stated, "Armenia is interested in deepening cooperation with the European Union" and that the EU mission would help "maintain international attention towards our region."

On 29 February 2024, the President of the National Assembly Alen Simonyan stated that Armenia should seek EU membership. In response, on 2 March 2024, Pashinyan advised that Armenia would officially "apply to become a candidate for EU membership in the coming days, within a month at most". On 5 March, Pashinyan stated that Armenia would apply for EU candidacy by Autumn 2024 at the latest. On 12 March 2024, the European Parliament passed a resolution noting that Armenia could apply for membership if it met the Copenhagen criteria, which is the membership requirements that were outlined in the Maastricht Treaty Article 49. The resolution praised the progress achieved by Armenia towards the implementation of CEPA. The resolution also acknowledged that CEPA acts as a blueprint to further integration, reforms, and a potential roadmap to a future Association Agreement and sectoral integration with the European single market. At the 2024 Copenhagen Democracy Summit, Pashinyan stated that he would like Armenia to become a member of the European Union "This year."

On 9 September 2024, Pashinyan confirmed that the issue of starting the EU membership process has become part of the Armenian political agenda. Pashinyan stated, "discussions are underway in the country regarding the possibility of Armenia becoming a member of the European Union," during a meeting with Vice-President of the European Commission Margaritis Schinas.

On 12 February 2025, Armenia's parliament approved a bill officially endorsing Armenia's EU accession. The decision for the government to pass the bill was reported to be the first step of "the beginning of the accession process of Armenia to the European Union". On 14 July 2025, Pashinyan met with European Council President Antonio Costa and European Commission President Ursula von der Leyen in Brussels to reaffirm Armenia's deepening partnership with the European Union. President Costa and President von der Leyen welcomed the passing of the EU Integration Act by Armenia, with President von der Leyen stating "Europe stands shoulder to shoulder with Armenia. European and Armenian relations are now closer than ever before."

=== Russia ===
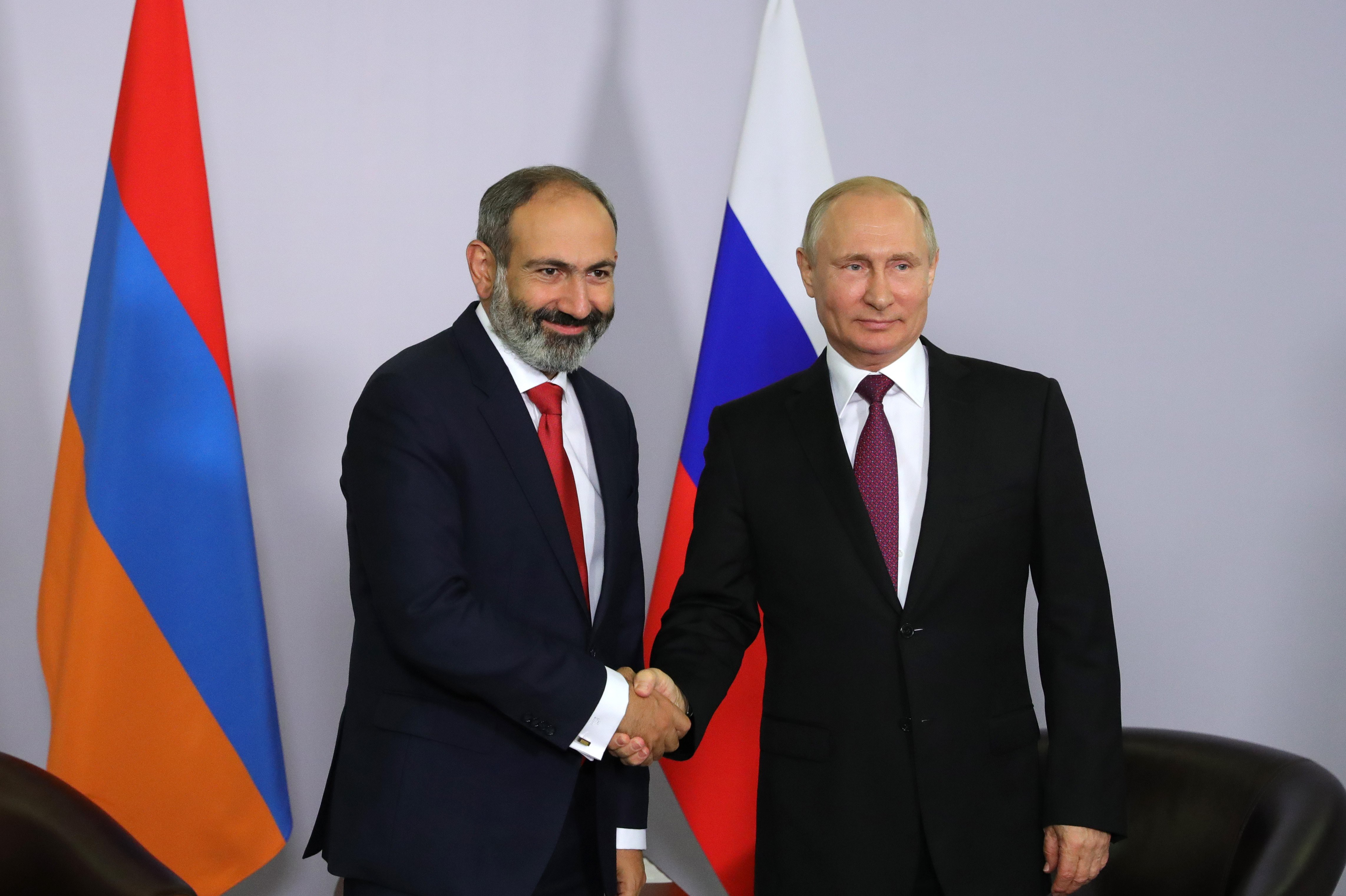
Pashinyan meeting with Russian President Vladimir Putin in Sochi, 14 May 2018

In 2013 he voted against Armenia's membership to the Russian-led Eurasian Economic Union, claiming it threatened Armenia's national security and sovereignty. Pashinyan argued that Armenia's membership to the union could hurt Armenia's relations with its neighbors, including Iran. RFE/RL noted in 2016 that Pashinyan's Civil Contract party "advocates a more neutral Armenian foreign policy" than Bright Armenia (led by MP Edmon Marukyan), and Republic (led by former PM Aram Sargsyan)—the two other members of the Way Out alliance—who have a pro-Western orientation. In August 2017 RFE/RL noted that Pashinyan "repeatedly objected last year to some pro-Western politicians’ calls for Yerevan to leave Russian-dominated trade bloc." Nonetheless, the Way Out Alliance parliamentary faction approved a draft statement by the parliament demanding the government to start a process of invalidating Armenia's accession treaty with the EEU. In 2016 he criticized and voted against the Armenian-Russian agreement on creation of the Unified Regional Air Defence System in the Caucasus by arguing that Armenia should "develop a system of air defence of sovereign Armenia. Why should we transfer our own air defence system under the command of Russia?" He stated that Russia "cannot be considered a real guarantor of Armenia's security. This kind of agreement with Russia creates only the illusion of a strengthening of security." In April 2018 he stated that he will not pull out of the Collective Security Treaty Organization (CSTO) and that he has "no problems with the Russian bases" in Armenia by citing Armenia's bad relations with Turkey. The Russian base in Gyumri, he said, guards the Turkish-Armenian border and Armenia needs it. In December 2018 he stated that Armenia does not seek NATO membership, but will continue to preserve relations with that organization. On 3 September 2023, during an interview, Pashinyan stated that it was a strategic mistake for Armenia to solely rely on Russia to guarantee its security. Pashinyan stated, "Moscow has been unable to deliver and is in the process of winding down its role in the wider South Caucasus region" and "the Russian Federation cannot meet Armenia's security needs. This example should demonstrate to us that dependence on just one partner in security matters is a strategic mistake." Pashinyan accused Russian peacekeepers deployed to uphold the ceasefire deal of failing to do their job. Pashinyan confirmed that Armenia is trying to diversify its security arrangements, most notably with the European Union and the United States. On 19 September 2023, Russian Deputy Chairman and former President Dmitry Medvedev blamed Pashinyan himself for threatening Armenia's security and damaging Russian relations, writing on his Telegram channel: "Once a colleague of mine from a brotherly country told me: 'Well, I’m a stranger to you, you will not accept me'. I said what I had to say: 'We will judge not by biography, but by deeds.' Then he lost the war, but strangely he remained in place. Then he decided to blame Russia for his defeat. Then he gave up part of his country’s territory. Then he decided to flirt with NATO, and his wife demonstratively headed to our enemies with cookies. Guess what fate awaits him..."

=== Turkey ===
In 1998, Pashinyan wrote an article advocating for stronger economic ties with Turkey and criticized an "anti-Turkish" sentiment in Armenia: "Of course, Armenia is the most suitable partner for Turkey in terms of economic development of Western Armenia. But all of Turkey's efforts to improve Armenian-Turkish relations have been in vain, and Armenia has not been able to get rid of the anti-Turkish complex for the past eight years."

Pashinyan's Haykakan Zhamanak supported the normalization process that then-President Serzh Sargsyan and Turkish President Abdullah Gül initiated, however, he criticized the "government's way of pursuing it." As prime minister, Pashinyan called Turkey's positions "illogical" regarding their precondition to solve the Karabakh conflict prior to establishing diplomatic relations. Pashinyan stated that his government remains committed to the international recognition of the Armenian genocide. In November 2018 Pashinyan reiterated that Armenia is ready to normalize its relations with Turkey without preconditions. He claimed that the recognition of the genocide is "not a matter of Armenian-Turkish relations", but instead is a "security issue for us and a matter of international security, and it is our contribution to the genocide prevention movement and process."

In October 2019, Pashinyan condemned the Turkish invasion of the Kurdish-controlled northeastern areas of Syria.

The Armenian Revolutionary Federation has criticized Pashinyan for pursuing a pro-Turkish policy at the expense of Armenian interests and human rights.

In August 2021, the Civil Contract party named National Assembly member Ruben Rubinyan as Armenia's representative for the normalization process with Turkey. Rubinyan had previously spent two years in Turkey for undisclosed reasons, which his parliament profile describes as "engaged in scientific activities".

On 28 May 2023, Pashinyan congratulated Turkish president Recep Tayyip Erdoğan on his reelection. Pashinyan traveled to Turkey to attend Erdogan's inauguration ceremony. Because Turkey had closed its airspace to Armenia in response to an Armenian genocide monument being opened, Pashinyan flew to Turkey on a Moldovan airliner. Vartan Oskanian, the former Foreign Minister of Armenia, criticized Pashinyan for attending the inauguration despite Erdogan frequently insulting Armenians and supporting Azerbaijan in the Nagorno-Karabakh conflict. Oskanian stated that Pashinyan "did not represent the Armenian people, only himself". In June 2025, Pashinyan conducted a working visit to Turkey.

=== Foreign relations ===
Originally an anti-Russian and pro-European activist, Pashinyan changed his views on foreign policy after getting elected. He considers himself as pro-Armenian and not associated with either Russia or the West.

Pashinyan was a fierce supporter of the Zurich Protocols. In November 2018 he reiterated that Armenia is ready to normalize its relations with Turkey without preconditions, but changed his decision because of increased internal pressure.
