= People's Party (Armenia) =

- Abbreviation: PP
- Leader: Vacant
- Founded: 1995
- Headquarters: Yerevan
- Membership: 14,520
- Ideology: Pro-Europeanism; Accession of Armenia into NATO

The People's Party (Armenian: Ժողովրդական Կուսակցություն, romanized: Zhoghovrdakan Kusaktsutyun) is a political party in Armenia which was founded in 1995.

== History ==
The party participated in the 1995 Armenian parliamentary election, winning just 0.9% of the popular vote.

In the 2007 Armenian parliamentary elections, the party ran independently and gained 2.74% of the popular vote but failed to win any seats in the National Assembly.

The party nominated Tigran Karapetyan as its candidate in the 2008 Armenian presidential election. He came in sixth place, receiving 0.60% of the vote.

The party participated in the 2009 Yerevan City Council election, gaining 2.15% of the vote, but failing to win any seats in the Yerevan City Council.

Prior to the 2012 Armenian parliamentary election, party leader Tigran Karapetyan claimed that his party would win seats, however, the party won just 0.58% of the popular vote following the election.

In 2014, party leaders announced their dissatisfaction with the government led by the Republican Party of Armenia. The party proposed a new alliance between Prosperous Armenia, the Armenian National Congress and Heritage parties to start a new national movement. A few supportive rallies were held in the capital, Yerevan, shortly after the announcement but no formal alliance was ever established.

The party originally announced its intentions to participate in the 2017 Armenian parliamentary elections, but ultimately did not participate. The party endorsed the ORO Alliance.

The party did not participate in the 2018 Armenian parliamentary election.

The party's original leader, Tigran Karapetyan died on 21 October 2021.

== Ideology ==
The party advocates for closer relations with the United States as well as with both European Union and CIS countries.

In July 2014, Tigran Karapetyan stated that he is against Armenia's membership in the Eurasian Union, during an interview.

== Activities ==
The party has often endorsed or supported other political groups in Armenia. In 2014, Karapetyan announced his support to the Prosperous Armenia party, the Armenian National Congress, and the Heritage party. In 2017, Karapetyan was supportive of the ORO Alliance and also expressed his admiration of the Sasna Tsrer Pan-Armenian Party.

== See also ==
- Politics of Armenia
- Programs of political parties in Armenia
