= Artak Zeynalyan =

Armenian politician

- Արտակ Զեյնալյան

Minister of Justice
- In office 12 May 2018 – 7 June 2019
- President: Armen Sarkissian
- Prime Minister: Nikol Pashinyan
- Preceded by: Davit Harutyunyan

Member of the National Assembly of Armenia
- In office 18 May 2017 – 12 May 2018
- Parliamentary group: Way Out Alliance

Personal details
- Born: 27 December 1969 (age 56) Yerevan, Armenian SSR, Soviet Union
- Party: Hanrapetutyun
- Children: 4

Artak Haykazi Zeynalyan (Armenian: Արտակ Հայկազի Զեյնալյան; born 9 September 1969) is an Armenian political figure, lawyer and former Minister of Justice.

== Biography ==
Artak Zeynalyan was born on 9 September 1969 in Yerevan. He served in the Soviet Army from 1987 to 1989. He fought in the First Nagorno-Karabakh War as a member of the Nikol Duman Volunteer Unit. He was wounded in 1992 and lost a leg as a result. He is a founding member of the Yerkrapah Volunteer Union. In 1996 he graduated from the Medical Faculty of the Mkhitar Heratsi Yerevan State Medical University. In 1999 he completed his residency at the National Institute of Health. He holds the degree of surgeon and organizer of healthcare.

In 2002, he graduated from the Academy of Management of the Republic of Armenia, earning the title of State Employee. He is a specialist in state management and local self-government. In 2006, he graduated from the Faculty of Law of the Gladzor Management University.

From 1986 to 1998, he worked at the Mikayelyan Institute of Surgery as a UAP, nurse and later as a doctor. From 1998 to 2001, he served as the deputy minister of health of Armenia. From 2000 to 2001, he headed a joint program called “Medico-Demographic Research” between the ministry of health and the American organization MAKRO International Inc.

In 2000, he headed two Committees for Humanitarian Aid adjunct to the Government of Armenia: the Republican Committee on Health and the Republican Committee for the reassessment of medical supplies received by humanitarian means. Since 2001, he has been a member of the human rights NGO's "Tanik" (Roof) and the Public Council for the Protection of Human Rights and Fundamental Freedoms. Since 2003, he has been a member of the Human Rights NGO "Lawyers Against Torture." In 2001, he founded the Hanrapetutyun ("Republic") Party together with Aram Sargsyan. He is a member of the party's political council and chief of staff of its central office.

In 2010 he was Chairman of the Committee on Constitutional Justice of the Scientific and Analytical Center of the Chamber of Advocates of the Republic of Armenia. That year he also taught at the School of Advocacy and the Chamber of Advocates of the Republic of Armenia. Since 2011, he is chairman and founder of the Human Rights NGO "Rule of Law."

From 2015 to 2017, he was an expert for the program "Implementation of an Effective Mechanism of Legal Protection in Road and Transport Relations and Improving the Legal Framework" and a member of the group "Justice." In 2016, he was coordinator of the program "Protection of the Rights of Citizens of Artsakh and Armenia as a Result of Military Intervention by the Republic of Azerbaijan."

On 2 April 2017, he was elected to the National Assembly from the national electoral list of the Way Out Alliance of parties. On 12 May 2018, he was appointed Minister of Justice of Armenia. He resigned on 7 June 2019.

Zeynalyan is a member of the United Platform of Democratic Forces.

== Mayor of Yerevan candidate ==
He led the Bright Alliance's electoral list in 2018 Yerevan City Council elections and was the alliance's candidate for the Mayor of Yerevan. After coming 3rd in the election he chose to give up his seat in Yerevan City Council and continue to work in the cabinet.

Zeynalyan was the Hanrapetutyun Party's mayoral candidate in the 2023 Yerevan City Council election. Hanrapetutyun won 8 seats in the Yerevan City Council following the election, with Zeynalyan coming in 4th place. Zeynalyan retained his seat in the city council.

=== Yerevan City Council elections ===
Election	Mayor candidate	Votes	%	Seats in City Council	Position
2018	Artak Zeynalyan	18,112	4.99%	3 / 65	3rd
2023	Artak Zeynalyan	26,236	11.32%	8 / 65	4th

== Awards ==
- 1996 - Awarded the Medal “For Courage” (Artsakh)
- 2009 - Awarded the title of Honorable Member of the Chamber of Advocates of the Republic of Armenia
- 2014 - Winner of the “Universal Law” Award (OSCE)
- 2016 - Awarded the title of “Human Rights Defender of the Year” (US Embassy in Armenia)

== Sources ==
Political offices
Preceded by Davit Harutyunyan	Minister of Justice of Armenia; 2018–2019	Succeeded by Rustam Badasyan
