= New Political Culture Party =

- Leader: Ani Zakharyan
- Founded: 2013
- Headquarters: Yerevan
- Ideology: Conservatism; Pro-Europeanism
- Political position: Centre-right
- National Assembly: 0 / 107

New Political Culture Party (Armenian: Նոր քաղաքական մշակույթ կուսակցություն) is a political party in Armenia. It is led by Ani Zakharyan.

== History ==
The party was founded on 2 April 2013, during a party congress held in Gyumri. Ani Zakharyan, a former member of the Republican Party of Armenia, was elected as Chairwoman. The party has never participated in national elections, and has no representation in the National Assembly. The party currently acts as an extra-parliamentary force.

== Ideology ==
The party supports Armenia's European integration and leader Ani Zakharyan has called for Armenia to sign an Association Agreement with the European Union. While the party supports strengthening economic relations with Russia, Zakharyan has stated that Russia poses a serious challenge for Armenia to sign any Association Agreement with the EU and accused Russia of trying to take advantage of Armenia's fragile political situation.

The party advocates for maintaining traditional views regarding marriage and opposes same-sex marriage, while supporting the activities of the Armenian Apostolic Church. The party also supports independent media and the unification of the Republic of Artsakh with Armenia. Ani Zakharyan advocates for advancing women's rights and allowing women to serve in the military, but opposes abortion rights.

== Activities ==
In January 2014, the party criticized the Prosperous Armenia party for failing to make any real political change in the country.

Prior to the 2017 Armenian parliamentary election, the party announced its support and endorsement of the Republican Party of Armenia.

In October 2019, Ani Zakharyan was collecting signatures from the public in central Yerevan, in an attempt to be appointed Prime Minister.

During the 2020–2021 Armenian protests, the party called for Prime Minister Nikol Pashinyan to resign. In June 2021, Ani Zakharyan proposed for herself to be nominated as President.

== See also ==
- Programs of political parties in Armenia
