= Alliance of Ideological Liberals =

Alliance of Ideological Liberals (GALA Party) Գաղափարախոսական լիբերալների դաշինք
- Leader: Vahan Khachatryan
- Founded: 2016
- Headquarters: Gyumri
- Ideology: Liberalism

Website
- Facebook page

The Alliance of Ideological Liberals, also known as the GALA Party (Armenian: Գաղափարախոսական լիբերալների դաշինք) is an Armenian political party.

== History ==
The Alliance of Ideological Liberals was founded on 1 July 2016 in Gyumri. The party was founded and currently led by businessman Vahan Khachatryan.

In 2016, the party participated in local elections in the city of Gyumri, winning 10.45% of the popular vote and gaining 4 seats on the Gyumri city council. Prior to the 2016 elections, the party announced plans to expand its activities outside of Gyumri.

The party participated in the 2018 Yerevan City Council election with the Green Party of Armenia as part of the "Yerevan Society Alliance". The alliance nominated Anahit Tarkhanyan as candidate for mayor of Yerevan. Following the election, the alliance received just 0.69% of the vote, failing to win any seats on the Yerevan City Council.

Prior to the October 2021 local elections in Gyumri, the party announced that they would not be participating and would not form any alliance with other parties.

To date, the party has never participated in national elections.

== Ideology ==
The party supports holding free and fair elections, strengthening democracy, establishing accountable government, and improving security.

== See also ==
- Programs of political parties in Armenia
