= Tsarukyan Alliance =

Tsarukyan Alliance «Ծառուկյան» դաշինք
- Leader: Gagik Tsarukyan
- Founded: 18 January 2017
- Dissolved: 14 November 2018
- Headquarters: Yerevan
- Ideology: Liberalism

Tsarukyan Alliance (Armenian: «Ծառուկյան» դաշինք; Tsarukyan Dashink) was a liberal political alliance of three political parties in Armenia: Prosperous Armenia, Alliance Party and Mission Party. It was formed on 18 January 2017, before the 2017 Armenian parliamentary election. The leader of the alliance was famous businessman Gagik Tsarukyan.

== History ==
On 2 April 2017, the alliance participated in the Armenian parliamentary election and won 31 seats out of 105 in the National Assembly. The Armenian National Movement Party announced its support to the alliance, while the Solidarity Party endorsed the alliance.

The alliance was officially dissolved prior to the 2018 Armenian parliamentary election.

== Composition ==
Party	Leader
Prosperous Armenia	Gagik Tsarukyan
Alliance Party	Tigran Urikhanyan
Mission Party	Manuk Sukiasyan

== Electoral record ==
=== Parliamentary elections ===
Election	Votes	%	Seats	Position	Government
2017	428,836	27.35	31 / 105	2nd	Opposition (2017-2018)
2017	428,836	27.35	31 / 105	2nd	Government (2018)
2017	428,836	27.35	31 / 105	2nd	Opposition (2018–2019)

== See also ==
- Programs of political parties in Armenia
