= Tigran Karapetyan =

Armenian politician (1945–2021)

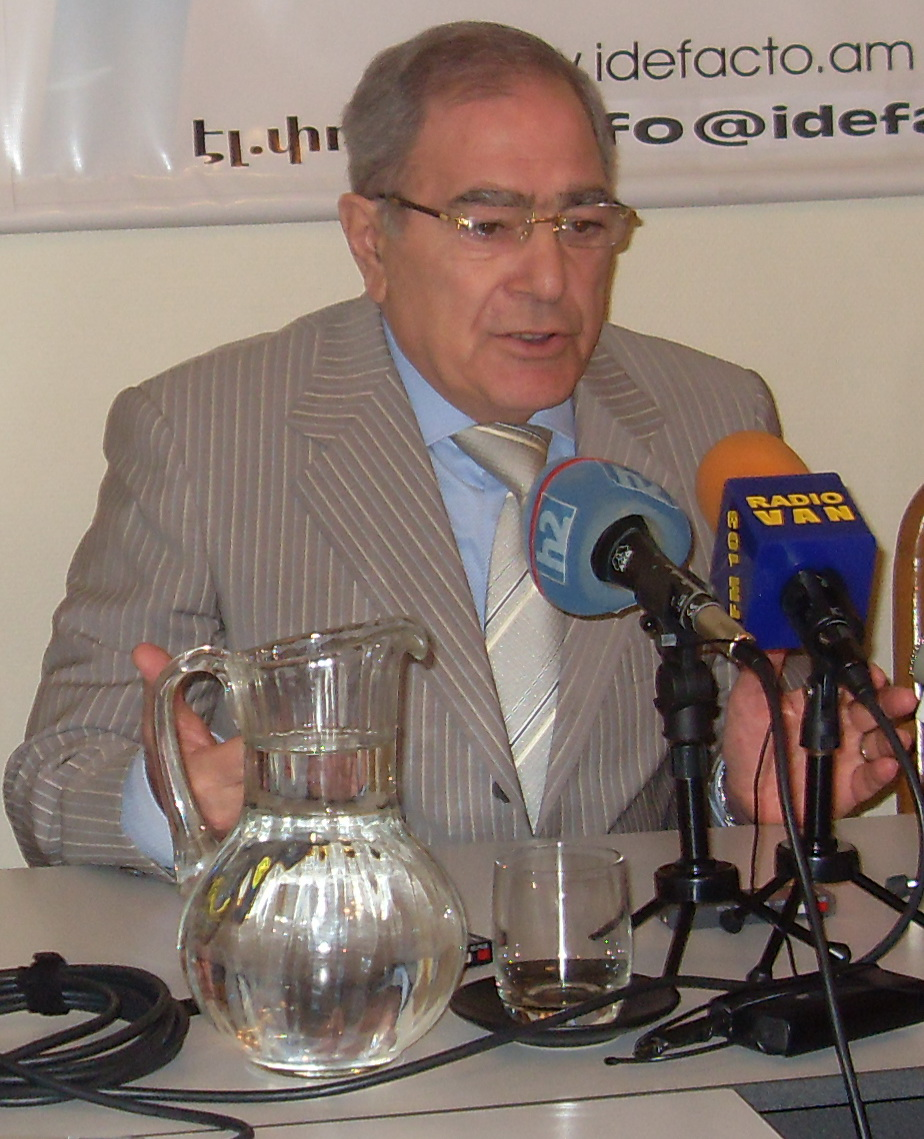

Chairman of the People's Party
- In office 1995 – 21 October 2021
- Preceded by: position established
- Succeeded by: vacant

Personal details
- Born: 16 May 1945 Yerevan, Armenian SSR, Soviet Union
- Died: 21 October 2021 (aged 76) Yerevan, Armenia
- Party: People's Party

Tigran Karapeti Karapetyan (Armenian: Տիգրան Կարապետի Կարապետյան; 16 May 1945 – 21 October 2021) was an Armenian politician and the chairman of the People's Party. He was also the owner of a private television company named ALM, which operated from 2002 to 2011.

Karapetyan was the founder of a small, populist political party which he founded after making his fortune in Russia. He appeared on his television station on a daily basis and his "folksy demeanour" was popular with working class and rural Armenians.

Tigran Karapetyan lost multiple elections and announced his "disappointment of people" in an incident in 2011 at Yerevan. He was popular for his charities to people of vulnerable groups. He was the author of a popular song "flowers" (ծաղիկներ), which he sang live on ALM.

He died on 21 October 2021, at the age of 76, from COVID-19 in Yerevan, during the COVID-19 pandemic in Armenia.

== Links ==
- ePress.am article
