= Bright Alliance =

Bright Alliance «Լույս» դաշինք
- Leader: Edmon Marukyan; Aram Sargsyan
- Founded: 28 August 2018
- Dissolved: 5 November 2018
- Headquarters: Yerevan
- Ideology: Liberalism; Pro-Europeanism
- Political position: Centre
- Colors: Purple

Website
- Official website

The Bright Alliance (Armenian: «Լույս» դաշինք, ԼՈՒՅՍ; LUYS Dashink, LUYS) was a liberal political alliance of two political parties in Armenia: the Bright Armenia party and Republic party. It was formed on 28 August 2018, before the 2018 Yerevan City Council election. Its leaders were Edmon Marukyan (leader of Bright Armenia) and Aram Sargsyan (leader of the Republic party and former prime minister between 1999 and 2000).

== Composition ==
Party	Leader
Bright Armenia (LH)	Edmon Marukyan
Hanrapetutyun Party (H)	Aram Sargsyan

== Ideology ==
Both parties are considerably pro-European and have called for closer relations and integration between Armenia and the European Union.

== History ==
On 23 September 2018, the alliance participated in the 2018 Yerevan City Council election with the Minister of Justice, Artak Zeynalyan, nominated as a candidate for Mayor. The alliance won 3 seats out of 65 in the Yerevan City Council, however, Zeynalyan lost the mayoral race- coming in 3rd place. After the election, Artak Zeynalyan gave up his mandate of City Council and continued his work as Minister of Justice.

Prior to the 2018 Armenian parliamentary election, the leaders of both parties agreed to dissolve the alliance. However, the leaders also agreed that cooperation between the two political parties may resume in the future and that they would continue to work closely together for the benefit of Armenian citizens.

== Electoral record ==
=== Yerevan City Council elections ===
Election	Mayor candidate	Votes	%	Seats in City Council
2018	Artak Zeynalyan	18,112	4.99%	3 / 65

== See also ==
- Politics of Armenia
- Programs of political parties in Armenia
