= 2009 Yerevan City Council election =

Local election in Armenia

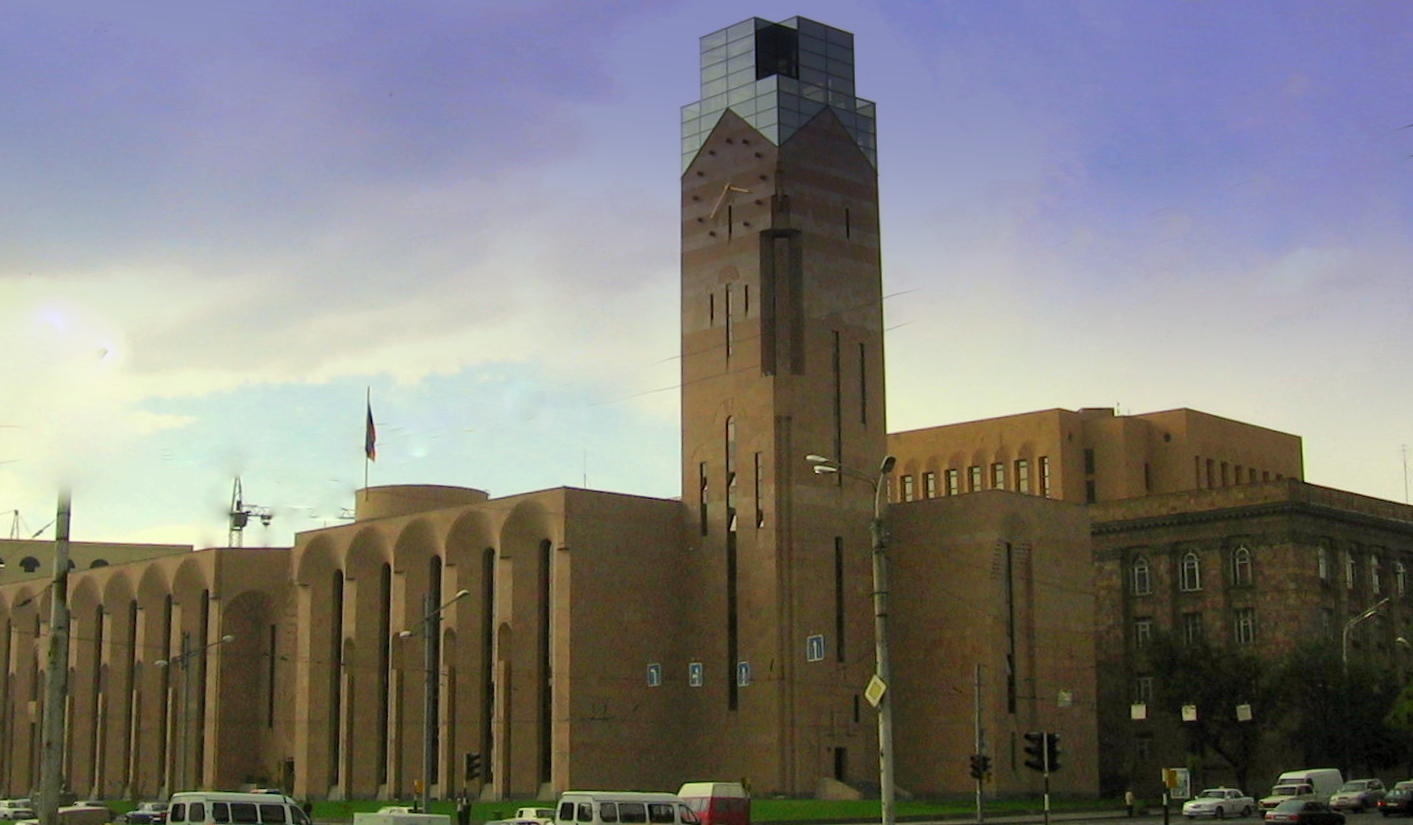
The Mayor's office of Yerevan

Yerevan City Council elections were held on May 31, 2009. All 65 seats were contested.

This was the first election to the City Council of Yerevan, capital of Armenia.

Summary of the 31 May 2009 Yerevan City Council election results
Party	Votes	%	Seats
Republican	186,630	47.43%	35
PAP	89,131	22.65%	17
ANC	69,140	17.57%	13
Rule of Law	20,106	5.11%	
ARF	18,094	4.60%	
People's Party	8,479	2.15%	
Socialist Workers Party of Armenia	1,936	0.49%	
Invalid votes	10,479		—
Total	404,634	100.00%	65
Source: Central Electoral Commission of Armenia
