= Andranik Margaryan =

Armenian politician; Prime Minister of Armenia (2000–2007)

- Անդրանիկ Մարգարյան
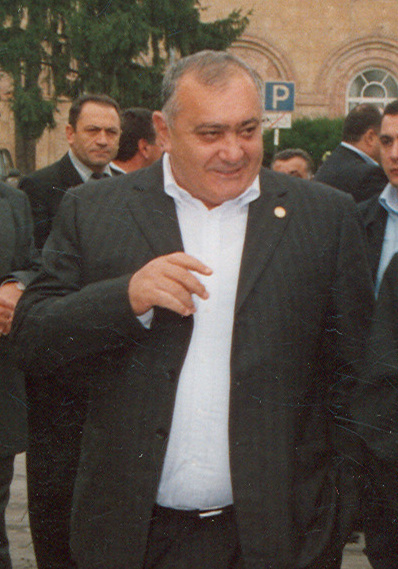

10th Prime Minister of Armenia
- In office 12 May 2000 – 25 March 2007
- President: Robert Kocharyan
- Preceded by: Aram Sargsyan
- Succeeded by: Serzh Sargsyan

Personal details
- Born: June 12, 1951 Yerevan, Armenian SSR, Soviet Union
- Died: March 25, 2007 (aged 55) Yerevan, Armenia
- Party: Republican Party
- Education: State Engineering University of Armenia
- Occupation: Politician; computer engineer

Andranik Nahapeti Margaryan (Armenian: Անդրանիկ Նահապետի Մարգարյան; 12 June 1951 – 25 March 2007) was an Armenian politician who served as the Prime Minister of Armenia from 12 May 2000, when the President appointed him, until his death on 25 March 2007. He was a member of the Republican Party of Armenia. He succeeded the Sargsyan brothers: Vazgen Sargsyan, who was murdered during the Armenian parliament shooting on 27 October 1999 and Aram Sargsyan, whom the President appointed a week later, but fired on 2 May 2000.

== Soviet Armenia ==
Andranik Margaryan was born on 12 June 1949 in Yerevan (in what was then the Armenian SSR of the Soviet Union) to a family of Armenian genocide survivors originally from Sason, Turkey. He studied cybernetics at the Yerevan Polytechnic University and graduated as a computer engineer. He first became engaged in Armenian politics in the late 1970s when he joined an illegal political party, the National United Party, that was campaigning for Armenia's secession from the Soviet Union. He has served on the National United Party's board since 1973. Margaryan had been a longtime critic of the totalitarian government of the Soviet Union. He envisioned an independent, democratic Armenia. Police arrested him in 1974 and a court sentenced him to two years in Soviet labor camps for proliferating "unpatriotic" ideas and activities.

== Armenian independence ==
In 1992 after Armenia's independence, Margaryan became a registered member of the Republican Party of Armenia (HHK), the first registered party in the 3rd Republic of Armenia. He influenced the party platform with the ideology he expressed as a member of the National United Party. He served as the Republican Party's Chairman of the Board from 1993 until his death. He had also been a member of the "Yerkrapah" Volunteer union since 1996 and served on the YVU's board.

In 2000 he was appointed Prime Minister of Armenia after the 1999 Armenian parliament shooting led to the murder of then prime minister Vazgen Sargsyan. Vazgen's brother, Aram Sargsyan, who the President appointed a week later as prime minister, was fired on 2 May 2000, leading to Andranik Markaryan being appointed as the 14th prime minister of Armenia. He had planned to resign after the 12 May 2007, elections in Armenia. Throughout his career, he was awarded the “Garegin Nzhdeh” medal by the Armenian Defense Ministry alongside the “Aram Manukian”, “Fridtjof Nansen” and “Vazgen Sargsyan” medals.

== Heart problems and death ==
Andranik Margaryan died of a heart attack on 25 March 2007, after nearly seven years in office, the second prime minister of Armenia to die in office and the first not related to an assassination. The head of Yerevan's municipal ambulance service reported that the prime minister was unconscious and his heart had stopped beating by the time two ambulance crews arrived at his apartment early in the afternoon. Margaryan was immediately given resuscitation treatment but did not respond.

Margaryan had a history of serious cardiac problems and twice underwent heart surgery, first in Armenia in 1999 and later in France. He regularly visited French and Russian clinics for medical examinations.

Andranik Margaryan is survived by a wife, two daughters, one son, and five grandchildren. In November 2011 his son Taron was elected Mayor of Yerevan.

== Career outside politics ==
Apart from politics, Margaryan has also followed a career in scientific research. From 1972 until his arrest in 1974, he worked at the Yerevan branch of Scientific-Research Institute of Gas Industry as a senior engineer. After his release from the Soviet labor camps in 1977, he worked at the Scientific-Research Institute of Energy as chief engineer before moving on to find work in the Energy-Technical Factory as head of department in 1978. From 1979 to 1990, he worked at the Information Counting Centre of the Trade Ministry as the head of department of electronics.

From 1990 to 1994 he was the head of the information department at the State Department of Special Programs. He then settled to work in Armenia's State Architectural University as junior scientist from 1994 to 1995.

Political offices
Preceded by Aram Sargsyan	Prime Minister of Armenia; 2000-2007	Succeeded by Serzh Sargsyan
