= Edmon Marukyan =

Armenian politician

- Էդմոն Մարուքյան
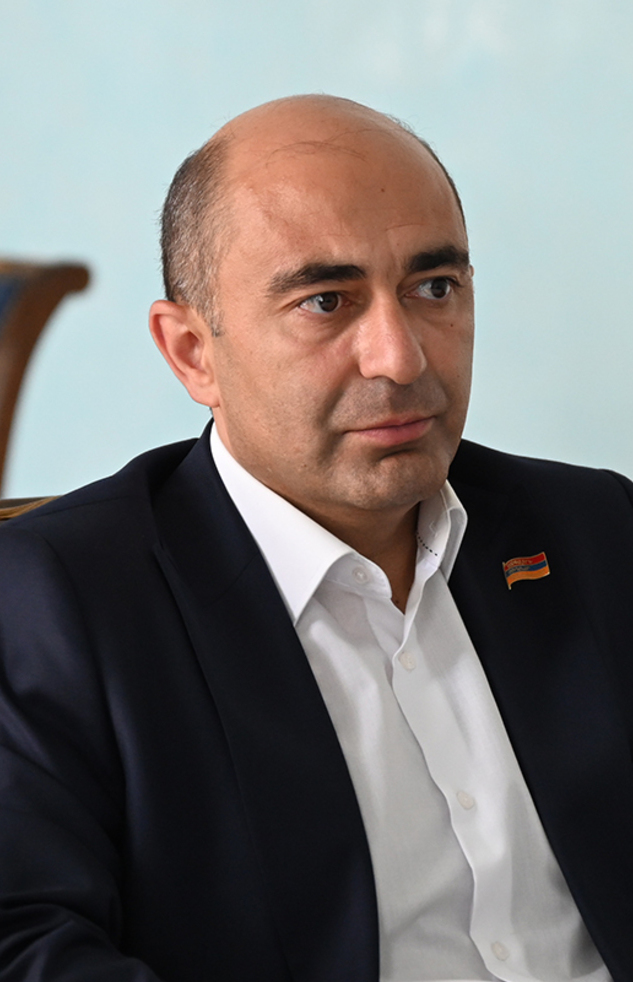
- Marukyan in 2021

Member of the National Assembly of Armenia
- In office 14 January 2019 – 10 May 2021
- Parliamentary group: Bright Armenia (head of the parliamentary faction)
- Constituency: Yerevan Districts Malatia-Sebastia, Shengavit
- In office 18 May 2017 – 14 January 2019
- Parliamentary group: Way Out Alliance
- Constituency: Lori
- In office 6 May 2012 – 18 May 2017
- Parliamentary group: Independent
- Constituency: Vanadzor

Personal details
- Born: January 13, 1981 (age 45) Kirovakan, Armenian SSR, Soviet Union
- Party: Bright Armenia
- Other political affiliations: Way Out Alliance (2016–2018); Bright Alliance (2018)
- Spouse: Tatevik Matinyan
- Children: 4
- Education: Plekhanov Russian University of Economics (LL.B.); Public Administration Academy of the Republic of Armenia (LL.M.); University of Minnesota Law School (LL.M.)
- Occupation: Lawyer; Politician
- Website: edmonmarukyan.com

Edmon Hrachiki Marukyan (Armenian: Էդմոն Հրաչիկի Մարուքյան) is an Armenian lawyer and politician, chairman of Bright Armenia party and Member of the Council of Reforms of the Constitution of Armenia since 2022. He was a member of the National Assembly of Armenia from 2012 to 2021. He was elected to parliament for the first time as an independent in May 2012. He founded the Bright Armenia Party in 2015 and has served as its chairman since. He was reelected to the National Assembly in April 2017, leading the electoral list of the Way Out Alliance, an electoral alliance between Bright Armenia, Civil Contract and the Hanrapetutyun Party. He was elected to parliament again in the 2018 parliamentary elections, leading Bright Armenia's electoral list. Marukyan left parliament after Bright Armenia failed to pass the electoral threshold in the 2021 snap elections. He was appointed ambassador-at-large by Prime Minister Nikol Pashinyan in March 2022.

== Early life and education ==
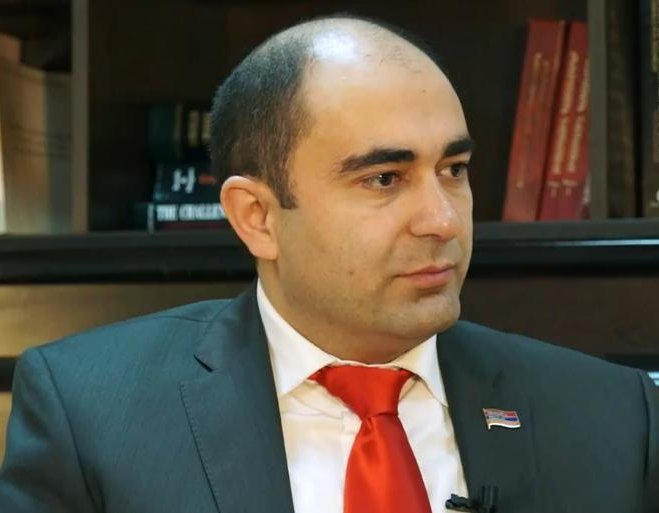
Edmon Marukyan in 2013 as a human rights activist

Edmon Marukyan was born on January 13, 1981, in Kirovakan (now Vanadzor), Armenian SSR, then part of the Soviet Union. He attended School #6 of his home town Vanadzor, then served in the Armenian Army.

Edmon holds two Master’s Degrees, one in Jurisprudence from the Public Administration Academy of Armenia and the second one in Law (LL.M.) with concentration in International Human Rights Law from the University of Minnesota Law School. Edmon Marukyan is a human rights advocate and the Chairman of the “Center for Strategic Litigations” Human Rights NGO since 2010. Since 2001, he has specialized in the protection of human rights and was considerably involved in strengthening of democracy and sustaining civil society in Armenia. He worked as legal advisor, defending citizens in courts, conducted strategic litigations taking cases up to the European Court of Human Rights.

Marukyan graduated from the Moscow Institute of Commerce and Law in 2002 with a Bachelor of Law degree. In 2006 he received qualification as a Specialist for the Protection of Human Rights and Interests from the Helsinki Foundation for Human Rights, Warsaw. In 2007 he graduated from the Public Administration Academy of the Republic of Armenia with a Master of Law degree. Three years later, in 2010, Marukyan received an LL.M. studying Human Rights and International Law at the University of Minnesota Law School as a Hubert H. Humphrey Fellow.

From 2010 to 2012, Marukyan worked as a consultant at Human Rights Watch, conducting research on human rights issues and drafting statements, letters and reports.

Along with his legal education, Marukyan participated in numerous specialized advocacy and human rights training courses in Armenia, Poland, Hungary, the US, Switzerland, Denmark, France, Germany, and Russia.

== Career ==
Since 2001, Marukyan has been actively involved in human rights activism in Armenia. He has been the head of several non-government human rights organizations. From 2007 to 2008 he lectured philosophy and political science at Vanadzor State University. Since 2008 Marukyan has been a member of the Chamber of Advocates of Armenia. He is also the author of a number of articles and reports on human rights in Armenia. Since 2001, he has specialized in the protection of human rights and has been considerably involved in the strengthening of democracy and civil society in Armenia. In 2008, Marukyan became the chairman of the Center for Strategic Litigations Human Rights NGO. In 2005, as a human rights NGO representative, he became an observer at the Public Monitoring Group, observing the rights of prisoners in penitentiary institutions in Armenia. He has provided legal consultation to a number of projects, defended citizens in court hearings, and conducted litigations for cases in the European Court of Human Rights. In 2017, Marukyan established the Institute of Liberal Politics.

== Political career ==
=== 2012 election ===
30th district results
Name	Party	Votes	%
Edmon Marukyan	non-partisan	11,689	34.2%
Viktor Dallakyan	Republican	9,271	27.1%
Zohrab Torosyan	ARF	5,272	15.4%
Ashot Manukyan	ANC	3,501	10.3%
Garnik Sahakyan	Heritage	2,394	7.1%
TOTAL		34,166	100%
Turnout		60,859	56.1%

The 2012 parliamentary election was held on May 6. He defeated Republican Viktor Dallakyan, who was previously an independent candidate and became a member of the ruling party just months prior to the election.

Armenian media widely responded to his election, calling him the "Bright Spot" or the "Kinder Surprise" of the May 6 election.

On May 8, 2012, just two days after the election Marukyan announced that he will not join any parliamentary faction.

== 2015-present ==
On December 12, 2015, Edmon Marukyan established Bright Armenia with likeminded professionals who have had successful career development achievements in their respective fields and had interest in entering politics and contributing to the democratic development of Armenia.

In October 2016, Bright Armenia participated in local-self-government elections of Vanadzor (third largest city in Armenia with 80,000 population) and came in second after the ruling party, taking 10 seats out of 33 in the Local Council. On December 12, 2016, in cooperation with Civil Contract and Hanrapetutyun political parties, Bright Armenia formed a political coalition named the Way Out Alliance, electing Edmon Marukyan to lead the proportional list of the coalition in parliamentary elections of April 2, 2017. The Way Out Alliance came third out of four political powers forming the new Parliament, which consisted of 105 seats. The Way Out Alliance was represented in the National Assembly through 9 MPs.

=== 2017 election ===
In the 2017 parliamentary election, Marukyan led the electoral list of the Way Out Alliance, which won 9 seats out of 105 in the National Assembly, becoming the 3rd political power out of 4 entering the National Assembly.

In addition to his committee assignments, Marukyan has been a member of the Armenian delegation to the Parliamentary Assembly of the Council of Europe since 2017. As part of the Alliance of Liberals and Democrats for Europe group, he serves on the Committee on Equality and Non-Discrimination.

=== 2018 election ===
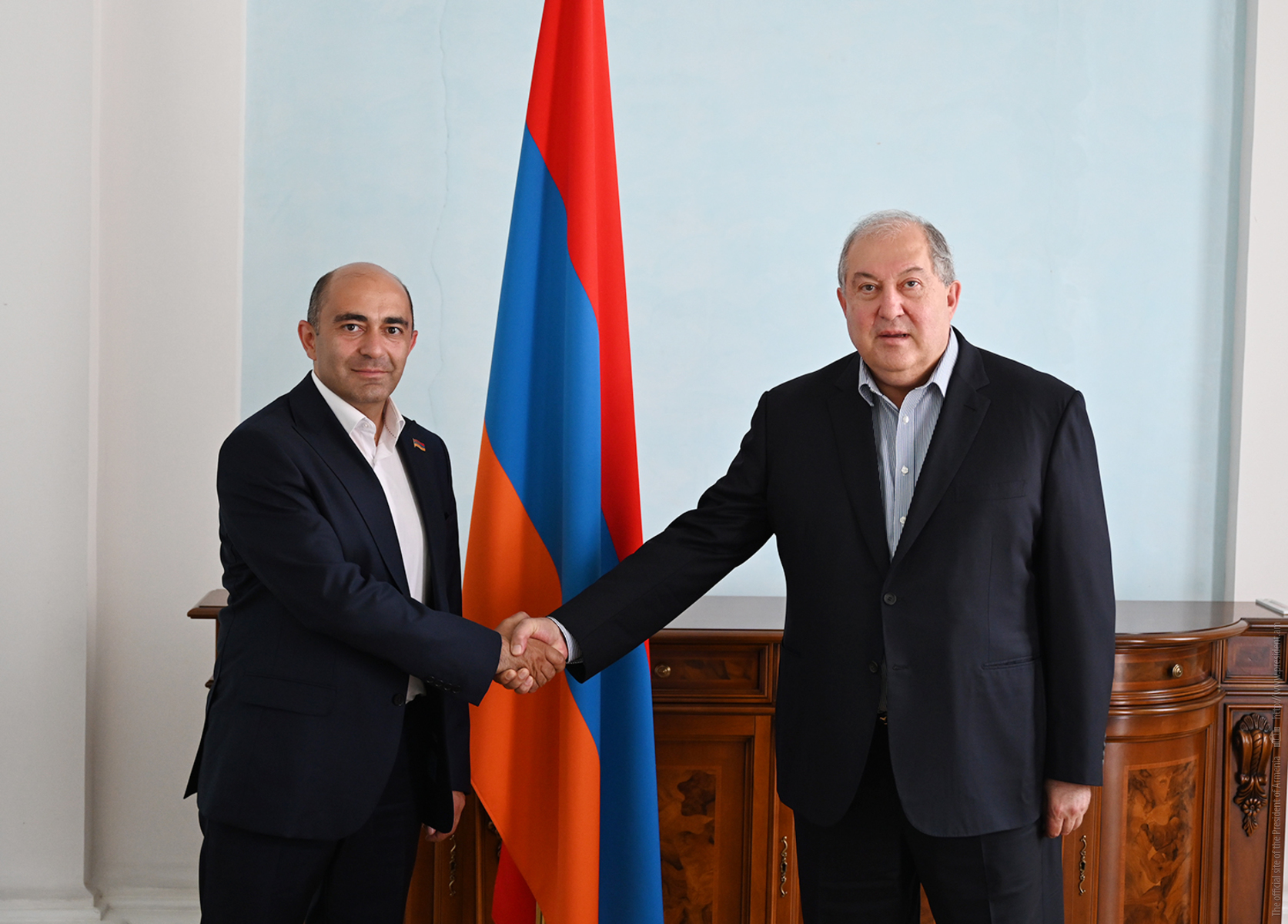
President of the Republic of Armenia Armen Sarkissian met with the leader of the "Bright Armenia" party, Edomon Marukyan.

After the Velvet Revolution the parliament was dissolved, and snap elections were conducted in which 11 political powers took part, however, only 3 parties made it into Parliament. Bright Armenia, led by Edmon Marukyan, came in the third, taking 18 seats out of 132 in the new Parliament. Edmon Marukyan was leading the Bright Armenia parliamentary faction in the National Assembly until June 2021.

Edmon Marukyan has been member to the Parliamentary Standing Committees on: - Defense, National Security and Internal Affairs; Foreign Relations; State and Legal Affairs (V convocation), - State and Legal Affairs and Protection of Human Rights (VI convocation), - Foreign Relations (VII convocation). At the same time, Edmon Marukyan has been member to the Parliamentary Assembly of Council of Europe (PACE). He has been member to the PACE Committees on: - Legal Affairs and Human Rights (First Vice-Chairperson) - Election of Judges to the European Court of Human Rights - Honouring of Obligations and Commitments by Member States of the Council of Europe (Monitoring Committee) - Equality and Non-Discrimination - Sixth Convocation NA EU-Armenia Parliamentary Cooperation Committee (PCC) - Parliamentary Assembly of the Council of Europe - Parliamentary Assembly of the NATO - Interparliamentary Committee on Cooperation between the National Assembly of the Republic of Armenia and Federal Assembly of the Russian Federation - Interparliamentary Committee on Cooperation between the National Assembly of the Republic of Armenia and National Assembly of the Artsakh Republic.

=== 2021 election ===
In the 2021 snap parliamentary election, Marukyan led the electoral list of the Bright Armenia party, receiving 1.22% of the votes and failing to overcome the 5% threshold to gain seats in parliament.

=== Ambassador-at-large ===
On March 14, 2022, by the decision of the Prime Minister of Armenia Nikol Pashinyan, Edmon Marukyan was appointed ambassador-at-large of the Republic of Armenia.

== Personal life ==
Marukyan is married and has 4 children. He is fluent in Armenian, English and Russian. His elder brother Krist Marukyan is also a member of Bright Armenia and has represented the party in local elections in Vanadzor.
