= Hanrapetutyun Party =

Hanrapetutyun Հանրապետություն
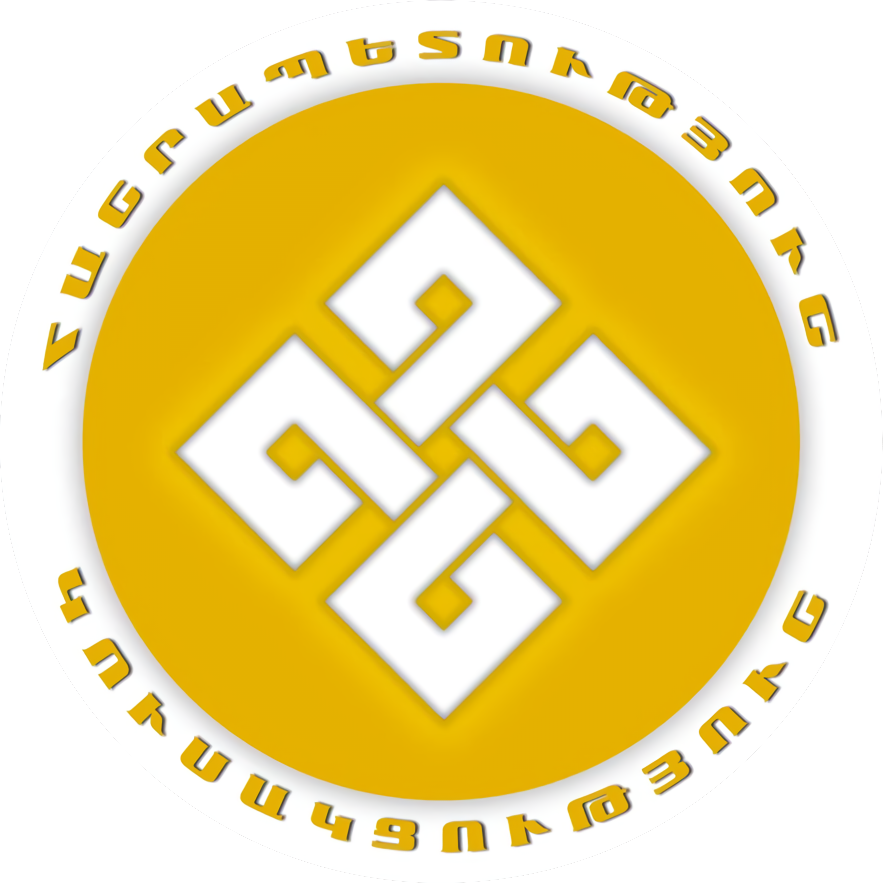
- Leader: Aram Sargsyan
- Founded: April 1, 2001
- Split from: Republican Party of Armenia
- Headquarters: Yerevan
- Ideology: Conservative liberalism Pro-Europeanism
- Political position: Centre to centre-right
- National affiliation: Justice (2003); Way Out Alliance (2016–2018); Bright Alliance (2018); We Alliance (2018); United Platform of Democratic Forces (2024–present)
- Slogan: "Jobs and Security"
- National Assembly: 0 / 107
- Yerevan City Council: 8 / 65

The Hanrapetutyun Party (Armenian: Հանրապետություն կուսակցություն, romanized: Hanrapetut'yun kusakts'ut'yun, lit. 'Republic Party') is a pro-European political party in Armenia. The party was founded by ex-members from the Republican Party of Armenia and members of the Yerkrapah Volunteer Union: Aram Sargsyan, Albert Bazeyan, Vagharshak Harutiunyan, Ara Ketikyan, among others, in April 2001.

== History ==
Following the 2003 Armenian parliamentary election, the party won 1 out of 131 seats. The party was aligned with the Justice coalition. In the 2007 Armenian parliamentary elections, the party failed to win any seats with a popular vote of just 1.65%.

The party participated in the 2012 Armenian parliamentary election, winning two seats.

In the 2017 Armenian parliamentary election and 2017 Yerevan City Council election, it took part in the elections as part of the Way Out Alliance together with the Civil Contract and Bright Armenia parties, winning few seats in each.

Following the Velvet Revolution in 2018, Civil Contract whose leader Nikol Pashinyan led the revolution, left the Way Out Alliance. After which, the Hanrapetutyun party formed another alliance with Bright Armenia, called Bright Alliance. The alliance took part in the 2018 Yerevan City Council election with Hanrapetutyun party's deputy leader Artak Zeynalyan as a Mayoral candidate. The Bright Alliance officially dissolved on 5 November 2018.

Prior to the 2018 Armenian parliamentary election, the party formed a new alliance, known as the We Alliance with the Free Democrats party. The alliance received just 2.00% of the popular vote. As this was lower than the 5% minimum threshold required, the We Alliance of Hanrapetutyn and Free Democrats failed to gain any representation in the Armenian parliament.

On 1 April 2021, the Hanrapetutyun party signed a joint declaration with 4 other political parties calling on the Government of Armenia to ensure free and fair upcoming elections, following the on-going political unrest in Armenia.

On 12 April 2021, the party confirmed they would participate in the 2021 Armenian parliamentary election. Following the election, the party won 3.04% of the popular vote, failing to win any seats in the National Assembly. The party currently acts as an extra-parliamentary force.

In November 2021, the party did participate in local elections in the cities of Dilijan and Meghri, winning 1 seat and 6 seats respectively within those city councils.

On 30 January 2023, Aram Sargsyan held a consultative meeting with Prime Minister Nikol Pashinyan.

On 21 February 2023, a conference of democratic forces including opposition political parties and civil society took place in Yerevan. Delegates from the Hanrapetutyun Party, Union for National Self-Determination, National Democratic Pole, European Party of Armenia and over a dozen representatives from Armenian civil society organizations participated. Members of the conference called on the Government of Armenia to announce its withdrawal from the CSTO and Eurasian Union and to realign Armenia's military integration with the United States and the West. In addition, the participants signed a declaration calling on the government to immediately submit an EU membership bid for Armenia.

In May 2024, the party joined the United Platform of Democratic Forces and signed a joint declaration along with the For The Republic Party, the Christian-Democratic Rebirth Party, and the European Party of Armenia supporting Armenia's bid to join the European Union and NATO. The declaration also condemned Russia's attempt to destabilize Armenia during the 2024 Armenian protests.

On 21 June 2024, the party participated in a hearing in the National Assembly in regards to holding a referendum on the submission of Armenia's EU candidate status. Sargsyan stated, "In the EU, Armenia's perception and assistance will change. I have no doubt that the Armenian people will receive very generous compensation in terms of arms, security, as well as economic development and investments."

== Ideology ==
The party has stated that it has both liberal and conservative views but tends to take a centrist approach on most issues. The party is strongly pro-European and supports the European integration of Armenia. The party has also stated that it is not anti-Russian but it believes that further integration with the Russian-led Eurasian Economic Union and the Collective Security Treaty Organization (CSTO) is not the right path for Armenia. Instead, the party advocates for closer relations with the European Union and supports Armenia's eventual accession to the EU. Following the Armenia–Azerbaijan border crisis, the party called for the withdrawal of Armenia from the Eurasian Union and the CSTO and for the country to realign its military cooperation with the United States. The party also called on the Government of Armenia to submit an application for Armenia's EU membership.

== Electoral record ==
=== Parliamentary elections ===
Election	Votes	%	Seats	Government
2003	15,298 (Note: Run in the national proportional vote as part of Justice Alliance. Figures are from the constituency vote)	1.45	3 / 131	Opposition
2007	22,288	1.65	0 / 131	Extra-parliamentary
2012	60,427 (Note: Did not run in the national proportional vote. Figures are from the constituency vote)	4.23	2 / 131	Opposition
2017	part of Way Out Alliance		9 / 105	Opposition (2017–2018)
2017	part of Way Out Alliance		9 / 105	Government (2018)
2018	part of We Alliance		0 / 132	Extra-parliamentary
2021	38,758	3.04	0 / 107	Extra-parliamentary

=== Local elections ===
==== Yerevan City Council elections ====
Election	Alliance	Mayor candidate	Votes	%	Seats
2017	part of Way Out Alliance	Nikol Pashinyan	70,730	21	14 / 65
2018	part of Bright Alliance	Artak Zeynalyan	18,114	4.99	3 / 65
2023	none	Artak Zeynalyan	26,525	11.32	8 / 65

== See also ==
- Programs of political parties in Armenia
