= Aram Sargsyan =

Armenian political figure (born 1961)

- Արամ Սարգսյան
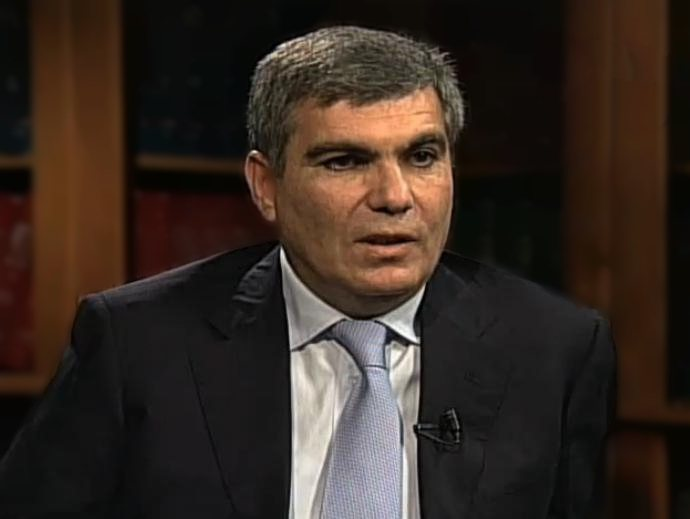
- Sargsyan in 2010

9th Prime Minister of Armenia
- In office 3 November 1999 – 2 May 2000
- President: Robert Kocharyan
- Preceded by: Vazgen Sargsyan
- Succeeded by: Andranik Margaryan

Member of the National Assembly
- In office 2 April 2017 – 14 January 2019

Leader of the Hanrapetutyun Party
- Incumbent
- Assumed office April 2001
- Preceded by: position established

Personal details
- Born: 2 January 1961 (age 65) Ararat, Armenian SSR, Soviet Union
- Party: Republican Party of Armenia (until 2001); Hanrapetutyun Party (since 2001)
- Other political affiliations: Armenian National Congress (2012)
- Relations: Vazgen Sargsyan (brother)
- Education: Yerevan Polytechnic University
- Occupation: Civil engineer

Aram Zaveni Sargsyan (Armenian: Արամ Զավենի Սարգսյան; born 2 January 1961) is an Armenian political figure. He is the younger brother of Vazgen Sargsyan. After his brother Vazgen was assassinated, he became Prime Minister of Armenia from 3 November 1999 to 2 May 2000.

In 2001, he founded the Hanrapetutyun Party. He supported the opposition leader Levon Ter-Petrosyan in the 2008 Armenian presidential election.

Sargsyan was elected to the Armenian National Assembly in May 2012 with the Armenian National Congress, but he didn't accept the seat.

In the 2017 Armenian parliamentary election, Sargsyan was elected through the proportional list of the Way Out Alliance.

Prior to the 2018 Yerevan City Council election, Sargsyan co-led the Bright Alliance.

Sargsyan led the Hanrapetutyun Party as its candidate for prime minister in the 2021 Armenian parliamentary election. The party received 3.04% of the vote, coming in fifth place.

In May 2024, Sargsyan joined the United Platform of Democratic Forces.

Political offices
Preceded by Vazgen Sargsyan	Prime Minister of Armenia; 1999–2000	Succeeded by Andranik Margaryan
