= 2017 Yerevan City Council election =

← 2013	May 14, 2017	2018 →

All 65 seats in Yerevan City Council 33 seats needed for a majority
- Turnout: 40.98%
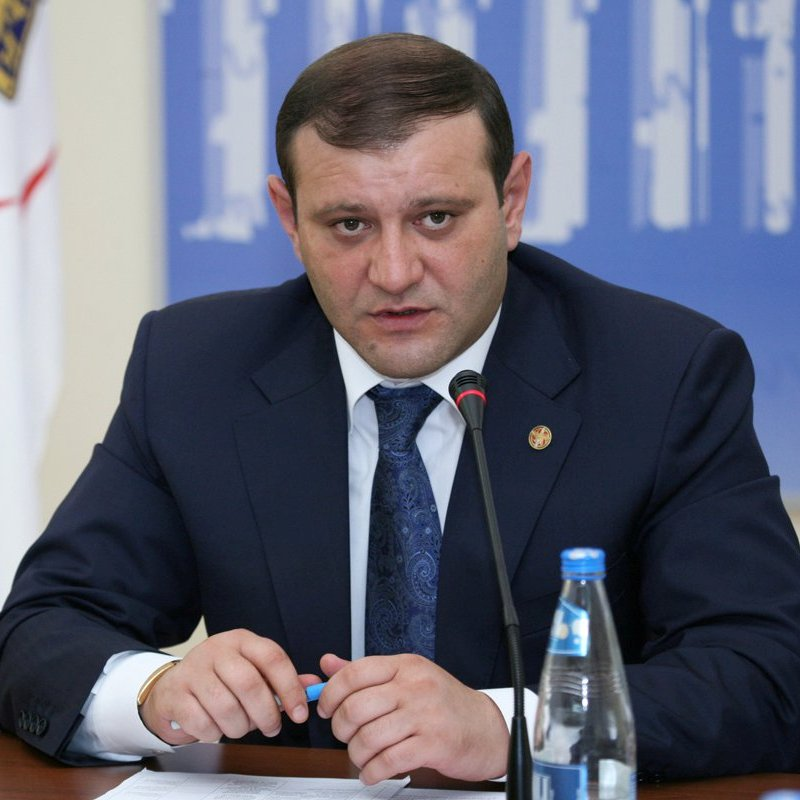

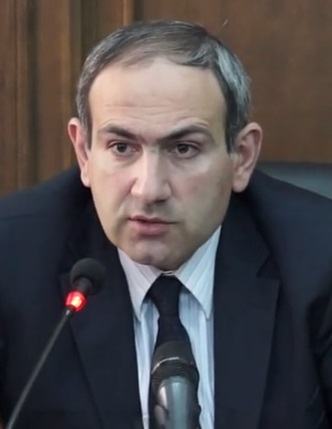

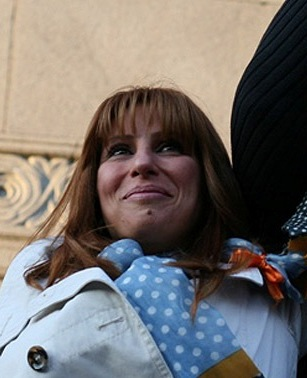
	First party	Second party	Third party
Leader	Taron Margaryan	Nikol Pashinyan	Zaruhi Postanjyan
Party	Republican	Way Out Alliance	Yerkir Tsirani
Last election	55.89%, 42 seats	–	–
Seats before	42	0	0
Seats won	46	14	5
Seat change	▲4	New	New
Popular vote	240,034	70,730	26,107
Percentage	71.25%	21.00%	7.75%
Mayor of Yerevan before election
Taron Margaryan
Republican
Elected Mayor of Yerevan
Taron Margaryan
Republican

Yerevan City Council elections were held on 14 May 2017. The Republican Party of Armenia won 71.25% of the total vote, the Way Out Alliance won 21%, while Yerkir Tsirani won 7.75%. Following the elections, Yerevan City Council elected Taron Margaryan as Mayor of Yerevan.

== Parties ==
Three parties were registered to participate, each with its candidate for Mayor:

- Republican Party of Armenia — Taron Margaryan
- Way Out Alliance — Nikol Pashinyan
- Yerkir Tsirani — Zaruhi Postanjyan

== Results ==
Party	Votes	%	Seats	+/–
Republican Party	240,034	71.25	46	+4
Way Out Alliance	70,730	21.00	14	New
Apricot Country Party	26,107	7.75	5	New
Total	336,871	100.00	65	0
Valid votes	336,871	97.61		
Invalid/blank votes	8,264	2.39		
Total votes	345,135	100.00		
Registered voters/turnout	842,151	40.98		
Source: Central Electoral Commission of Armenia
