= 2018 Yerevan City Council election =

Local election in Armenia

- September 23, 2018

All 65 seats to Yerevan City Council 33 seats needed for a majority
- Turnout: 43.66%
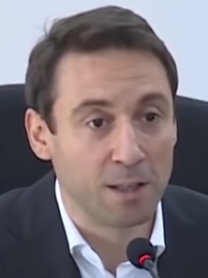
	First party	Second party	Third party
			BA
Leader	Hayk Marutyan	Naira Zohrabyan	Artak Zeynalyan
Party	My Step Alliance	PAP	Bright Alliance
Last election	Part of Way Out Alliance holding 14 seats	New	Part of Way Out Alliance holding 14 seats
Seats won	57	5	3
Popular vote	294,092	25,218	18,114
Percentage	81.06%	6.95%	4.99%
Mayor of Yerevan before election
Kamo Areyan (acting)
Republican Party of Armenia
Mayor of Yerevan
Hayk Marutyan
My Step Alliance

Yerevan City Council elections were held on 23 September 2018. The snap election was triggered after the resignation of former mayor Taron Margaryan amid the aftermath of the 2018 Armenian Velvet Revolution. Well-known comedian and actor Hayk Marutyan, heading the electoral list of the My Step Alliance, was elected to the office of mayor of Yerevan.

== Candidates ==
979 candidates competed for 65 open seats in the Yerevan city council (also known as the "council of elders").

A total of 12 parties/alliances participated in the election (numbered below according to the electoral ballot listing):

- 1. Prosperous Armenia, led by Naira Zohrabyan, member of the National Assembly and the vice-president of Prosperous Armenia.
- 2. Yerevan Society Alliance (also known as "Happy Society Alliance"), includes the Green Party of Armenia and the Alliance of Ideological Liberals (GALA party), led by Anahit Tarkhanyan, wife of 2013 presidential election candidate Andrias Ghukasyan.
- 3. Yerevantsiner Alliance ("People of Yerevan Alliance"), includes the Armenian National Movement Party and the "Armenian Homeland" party, led by Ararat Zurabyan, member of the National Assembly and the leader of the Armenian National Movement Party.
- 4. Yerkir Tsirani, led by Zaruhi Postanjyan, member of the Yerevan City Council, and the leader of Yerkir Tsirani.
- 5, Heritage, led by Raffi Hovannisian, the first Foreign Minister of Armenia, former member of the National Assembly and the leader of Heritage.
- 6. Democratic Way Party, led by Manuel Gasparyan, leader of the Democratic Way Party.
- 7. My Step Alliance, formed by Civil Contract and the Mission Party, led by Hayk Marutyan, member of Civil Contract.
- 8. Bright Alliance, formed by Bright Armenia (leader: Edmon Marukyan, member of the National Assembly from Way Out Alliance) and the Hanrapetutyun Party (leader: Aram Sargsyan, former prime minister, member of National Assembly from Way Out Alliance) nominates Artak Zeynalyan, current Minister of Justice and member of the Hanrapetutyun Party, former member of the National Assembly from the Way Out Alliance.
- 9. Armenian Revolutionary Federation, led by Mikayel Manukyan, former member of the National Assembly and current director of the forests committee of the Ministry of Nature Protection, member of the Armenian Revolutionary Federation.
- 10. Hayk Party, led by Gevorg Hovsepyan, leader of the Nzhdehian Tseghakron Party.
- 11. Reformist Party, led by Artak Avetyan.
- 12. Rule of Law, led by Mher Shahgeldyan, former member of the National Assembly and member of the Rule of Law party.

A pre-election analysis of the top 10 lists from each party or alliance revealed that:

- Only Bright Alliance lists Yerevan city council members among its top 10 candidates. There are 7 of them, all are members of the current opposition Way Out Alliance.
- Only Prosperous Armenia and the "Yerevantsiner Alliance" each list one acting member of parliament.
- Only Bright Alliance lists an acting minister (Artak Zenalyan, Minister of Justice).

== Electoral code and voter data ==
According to official data there were 848,343 eligible voters.

Foreign citizens living in Yerevan could cast their ballots if they had at least a one-year registration before voting day.

The electoral code defines one vote per voter and a threshold of 6 percent of cast ballots for parties (50,900 votes at 100% turnout) and 8 percent for alliances (67,867 at 100% turnout), surpassing which is required for consideration during mandate allocations. Only if less than 3 parties/alliances pass the threshold, would all three best performing parties/alliances be allocated mandates. A “bonus” to the political force that wins at least 40 percent of the council seats will allow it to occupy majority of the seats and appoint the new mayor of Yerevan.

Mandates will be allocated according to proportional representation principle, while regarding Yerevan as one multi-mandate electoral district.

== Election observation ==
Only one international organization, the International Expert Center for Electoral Systems (ICES) was registered for monitoring the election.

While 662 observers from 8 local organizations and 598 representatives of 49 media outlets participated. Ten of the representatives were from 5 foreign media outlets.

== Electoral fraud prevention and counteraction ==
Ahead of the September 23 election, in the second and final reading, the Armenian Parliament unanimously ratified a bill criminalizing electoral fraud. The amendments to Armenia’s Criminal Code make electoral fraud punishable by imprisonment whereas before, individuals charged with vote buying or selling were simply fined.

Police established a telephone hot line which was used to report electoral fraud on election day. Anonymity of those who report corruption cases will be guaranteed.

== Election campaign ==
The campaign was marked by bitter accusations by leading candidates. Prime Minister of Armenia, Nikol Pashinyan, said the elections will be between "bright" and "dark" forces.

After some candidates called for public debates and expressed their participation willingness, a debate was scheduled to be broadcast on public TV on the last campaign day, September 21 at 22:25 - just 95 minutes before "silence day" begins. The debate was recorded in advance, rather than broadcast live. For this reason, only one candidate, Naira Zohrabyan, representing Prosperous Armenia had declined participation and called for a live debate, while ten candidates confirmed their participation. If broadcast shall indeed end before midnight, assuming equal speaking time distribution to the candidates and taking into amount some time for moderation, it was expected that speaking time per candidate would amount to only about 7 (+-2) minutes.

== Opinion polls ==
On September 11, Gallup International published an opinion poll survey. According to the poll:

- 39.9% of the Yerevan residents will back My Step Alliance mayoral candidate Hayk Marutyan
- 11.8% will vote for Prosperous Armenia candidate Naira Zohrabyan
- 4.2% of the respondents said they will vote for Bright Alliance candidate Artak Zeynalyan
- 2.5% will back Zaruhi Postanjyan’s candidacy from Yerkir Tsirani
- 1.1% said they will vote for Orinats Yerkir (Rule of Law) candidate Mher Shahgeldyan
- 1.1% for Raffi Hovhanissian from Heritage
- 0.8% said they will vote for the Armenian Revolutionary Federation's candidate
- 0.3% will vote for the Yerevan Society alliance
- 0.2% will vote for the Yerevantsiner alliance

If these numbers held, only the top 3 parties/alliances (My Step, Prosperous Armenia, and Bright Alliance) would make it into city council, according to the rule of passing the electoral threshold and requiring a minimum of 3 parties/alliances to be represented in council.

== Results ==
The My Step Alliance won a landslide victory in the Yerevan City Council elections, according to preliminary data.

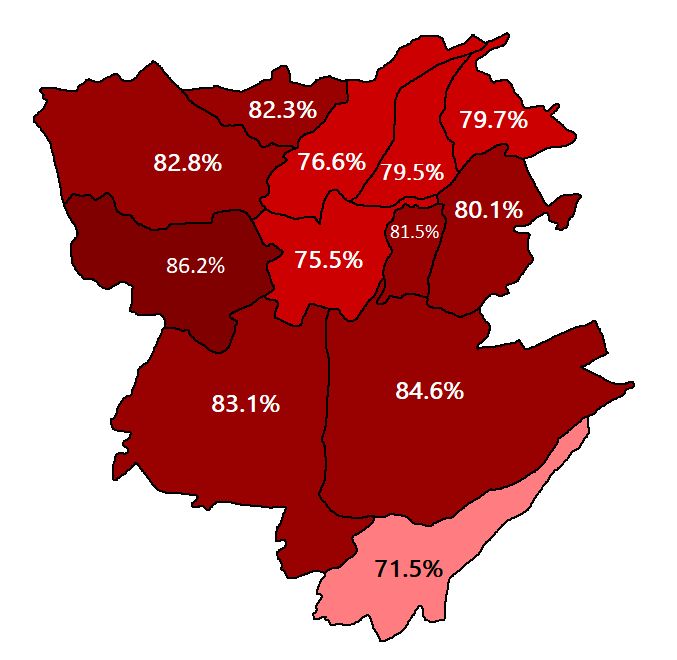
Percentage of the vote of the My Step Alliance by districts of Yerevan.

Party	Votes	%	Seats
My Step Alliance	294,092	81.07	57
Prosperous Armenia	25,218	6.95	5
Bright Alliance	18,114	4.99	3
Armenian Revolutionary Federation	5,882	1.62	0
Apricot Country Party	5,059	1.39	0
Orinats Yerkir	3,947	1.09	0
Yerevantsiner Alliance	2,986	0.82	0
Heritage	2,709	0.75	0
Yerevan Society Alliance	2,502	0.69	0
Democratic Way Party	799	0.22	0
Reformist Party	792	0.22	0
Hayk Party	682	0.19	0
Total	362,782	100.00	65
Valid votes	362,782	97.96	
Invalid/blank votes	7,539	2.04	
Total votes	370,321	100.00	
Registered voters/turnout	848,346	43.65	
Source: Central Electoral Commission

Well-known comedian and actor Hayk Marutyan, who heads the electoral list of the My Step Alliance, became the next mayor of Yerevan as the My Step Alliance garnered more than 50 percent of mandates, and according to law, the person who heads the electoral list of the winning political force is considered mayor-elect. Hayk Marutyan assumed office on 10 October 2018. He is elected for a term of 4 years.
