= Way Out Alliance =

Political alliance in Armenia of three parties

Way Out Alliance «Ելք» դաշինք
- Leader: Edmon Marukyan (LH); Nikol Pashinyan (KP); Aram Sargsyan (H)
- Founded: 12 December 2016
- Dissolved: 12 September 2018
- Headquarters: Yerevan
- Ideology: Liberalism; Pro-Europeanism; Anti-EAEU; Anti-Russian sentiment Armenian civic nationalism
- Political position: Centre
- Colors: Orange

The Way Out Alliance (Armenian: «Ելք» դաշինք, ԵԼՔ; YELK Dashink, YELQ) or Yelk Alliance or simply Yelk or Way Out was a liberal political alliance of three political parties in Armenia: Civil Contract, Bright Armenia and the Hanrapetutyun Party. It was formed on 12 December 2016, before the 2017 Armenian parliamentary election. Its leaders were Edmon Marukyan (leader of Bright Armenia), Nikol Pashinyan (leader of Civil Contract), and Aram Sargsyan (leader of Hanrapetutyun and former Prime Minister of Armenia). The alliance was dissolved on 12 September 2018 after its constituent parties agreed to participate in the 2018 parliamentary elections separately.

== History ==
On 2 April 2017, the alliance participated in the 2017 Armenian parliamentary election with Edmon Marukyan as leader of the alliance and won 9 seats out of 105 in the National Assembly. Prior to the election, the Union for National Self-Determination, another liberal Pro-European party, also wished to join the Way Out Alliance, however their request was never responded too.

After parliamentary elections, the alliance participated in the 2017 Yerevan City Council election. The alliance's candidate for Mayor of Yerevan was Nikol Pashinyan. However, the alliance won only 14 seats out of 65 in the Yerevan City Council and Nikol Pashinyan gave up his mandate of City Council and continued his work in the National Assembly as an MP.

The alliance supported the goals of the 2018 Armenian Revolution and actively participated in street protests supporting Nikol Pashinyan.

The alliance did not participate in the 2018 Yerevan City Council election. Bright Armenia and the Hanrapetutyun Party formed another alliance - Bright Alliance. Meanwhile, Civil Contract formed the My Step Alliance with the Mission Party. The My Step Alliance won the municipal elections and their candidate Hayk Marutyan was appointed as the Mayor of Yerevan. Bright Alliance came in third place, winning 3 seats out of 65 in the Yerevan City Council.

== Ideology ==
The Way Out Alliance's ideology was based on liberalism. The three parties, especially Bright Armenia and Hanrapetutyun, are considerably pro-European and support Armenia's European integration. In terms of foreign relations of Armenia, the alliance stated that Armenia's decision to join the Eurasian Economic Union was wrong and had a negative impact on the country. The alliance proposed to renegotiate with the European Union on signing an Association Agreement along with a Deep and Comprehensive Free Trade Agreement.

== Composition ==
Party	Leader
Civil Contract (KP)	Nikol Pashinyan
Bright Armenia (LH)	Edmon Marukyan
Hanrapetutyun Party (H)	Aram Sargsyan

== Electoral record ==
=== Parliamentary elections ===
Election	Votes	%	Seats	Government
2017	122,049	7.78	9 / 105	Opposition (2017-2018)
2017	122,049	7.78	9 / 105	Government (2018–2019)

=== Local elections ===
==== Yerevan City Council elections ====
Election	Mayor candidate	Votes	%	Seats in City Council
2017	Nikol Pashinyan	70,730	21%	14 / 65

== See also ==
- Programs of political parties in Armenia
- Politics of Armenia
