= Prosperous Armenia =

Armenian political party

Prosperous Armenia Բարգավաճ Հայաստան Կուսակցություն
- Leader: Gagik Tsarukyan
- Founded: 30 April 2004
- Headquarters: Yerevan
- Ideology: Social conservatism; Economic liberalism; Russophilia; Soft Euroscepticism
- Political position: Centre-right
- National affiliation: Homeland Salvation Movement (2020-2021)
- European affiliation: Alliance of Conservatives and Reformists in Europe (until 2022)
- Slogan: "Safe, Powerful Homeland"
- National Assembly: 0 / 107

Website
- http://www.bhk.am/

Prosperous Armenia Party (PAP; Armenian: Բարգավաճ Հայաստան կուսակցություն, romanized: Bargavach Hayastan kusakts’ut’yun, abbreviated as ԲՀԿ BHK), is a conservative political party in Armenia. It was founded by businessman Gagik Tsarukyan on 30 April 2004, when the constituent congress of the party took place.

Ideologically, the party is positioned as centre-right on the political spectrum, it advocates economic liberalism, closer ties with Russia, and regarding the European Union it is eurosceptic, while on social issues they are socially conservative.

== Founding ==
Although Gagik Tsarukyan is widely credited as the founder of the PAP, Armenia's second president Robert Kocharyan is believed to have been instrumental in the creation of the party. Armen Ashotyan, a close ally of former president Serzh Sargsyan, even claimed that Kocharyan himself established the PAP. However, Kocharyan's influence over the party has been a subject of debate among observers of Armenian politics. In 2012, "most analysts" believed Kocharyan was "closely involved" with the party. However, the more common view among political analysts today is that the PAP is a vehicle for Tsarukyan and that Kocharyan has no influence over the party. In April 2026, Tsarukyan declared that the PAP would not support the candidacy of Kocharyan for prime minister in the case of an opposition victory in the 2026 Armenian parliamentary election.

== Ideology ==
The party maintains a pro-Russian stance, and advocates for the preservation of national and traditional values, families, and church and state relations as the most important priorities. The party also claims to support building stronger democratic and neighborly relations within the Caucasus region and with other post-Soviet states. Despite being a soft eurosceptic party, the PAP does believe in maintaining strong relations and economic partnership with the European Union.

== Power base ==
According to sociologist Karen Sargsyan, the party base largely consists of provincial rural population. Kotayk Province is widely considered its stronghold. During the 2012 parliamentary election, the PAP came first and won around 47.5% of the vote in that province, well above the national average of 30%. While in the 28th electoral district, which includes the city of Abovyan and several surrounding villages, the party won over 71%.

== Electoral record ==
The party debuted in the 2007 Armenian parliamentary elections, winning 25 seats and 15.1% of the votes, making it the second largest political party in parliament.

In the 2012 Armenian parliamentary elections, it more than doubled its share of the vote to 30.12%, winning 35 seats and solidifying its position as the main opposition party.

In the 2017 Armenian parliamentary election, the party participated as part of the Tsarukyan Alliance. The alliance won 31 seats.

Following the 2018 Armenian parliamentary election, the PAP lost five seats but was still the second largest party in the National Assembly and one of the two official opposition parties, the other being Bright Armenia.

In May 2021, the party confirmed it would participate in the 2021 Armenian parliamentary elections. Following the election, the party won just 3.95% of the popular vote, losing all political representation in the National Assembly. The party currently acts as an extra-parliamentary force.

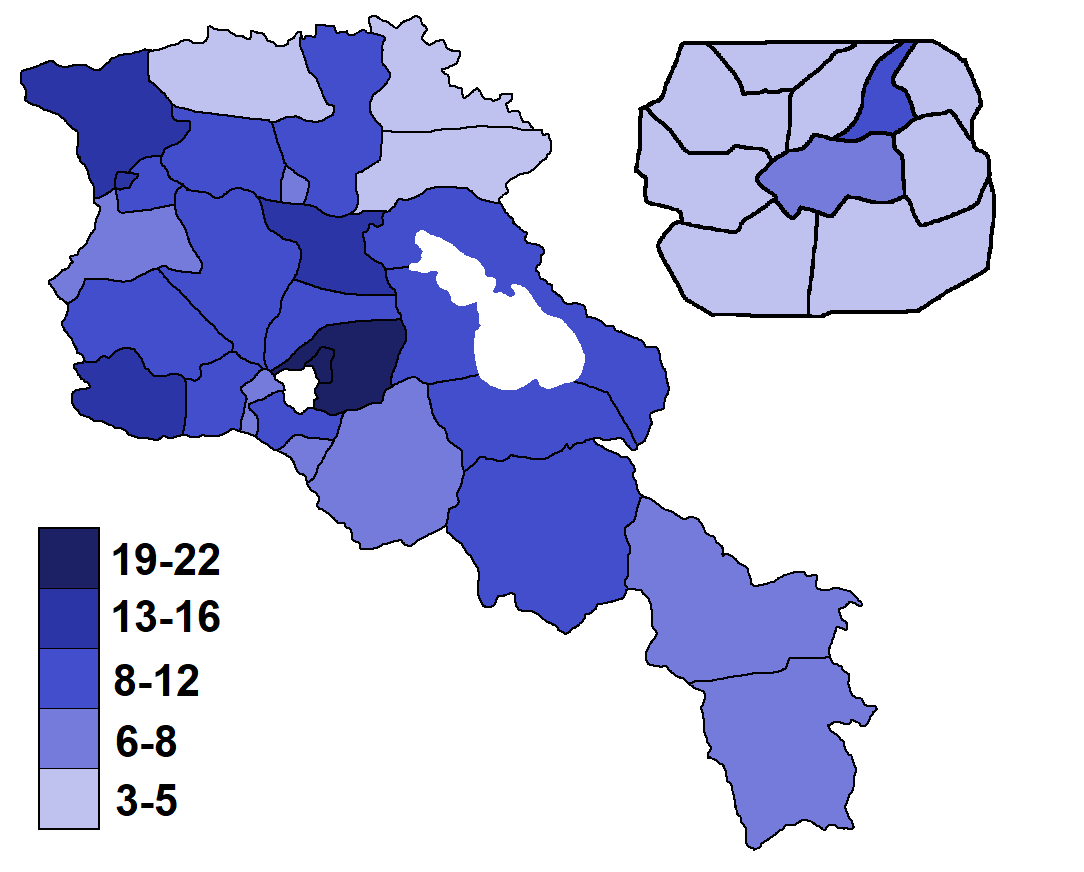
Percentage of votes won by the PAP by electoral district in the 2018 Armenian parliamentary election.

=== Parliamentary elections ===
Year	Party-list			Constituency /total	Total seats	+/–
Year	Votes	%	Seats /total	Constituency /total	Total seats	+/–
2007	204,483	15.1%	18 / 90	8 / 41	25 / 131	new
2012	454,673	30.12%	28 / 90	9 / 41	35 / 131	▲10
2017 (Note: As part of Tsarukyan Alliance)	428,965	27.35%	31 / 105	—		▼4
2018	103,824	8.27%	26 / 132	—		▼5
2021	50,444	3.95%	0 / 107	—		▼26
2026	58,378	4.00%	0 / 105	—		0

=== Presidential elections ===
Year	Candidate	Votes	%	Rank
2008	endorsed Serzh Sargsyan			
2013	did not participate			

=== Local elections ===
==== Yerevan City Council elections ====
Election	Mayor candidate	Votes	%	Seats in City Council
2009	Arman Vardanyan	89,131	22.65%	17 / 65
2013	Vartan Oskanian	97,189	23.07%	17 / 65
2017	—			
2018	Naira Zohrabyan	25,218	6.95%	5 / 65

== Activities ==
In 2014, the PAP and the Armenian Liberal Party signed a cooperation agreement.

On 9 November 2020, the party signed a joint declaration with the other member parties of the Homeland Salvation Movement calling on Prime Minister Nikol Pashinyan to resign during the 2020–2021 Armenian protests.

== See also ==
- Politics of Armenia
- Programs of political parties in Armenia
