= Yerevan City Council =

Administrative authority of Yerevan, Armenia

Coordinates: 40°10′29″N 44°30′15″E

Yerevan City Council Երևան քաղաքի ավագանի

Type
- Type: Unicameral

Leadership
- Mayor: Tigran Avinyan since 17 March 2023

Structure
- Seats: 65
- Political groups: Civil Contract (24); National Progress (14); Mother Armenia (12); Hanrapetutyun Party (8); Public Voice (7)
- Committees: 4

Elections
- Voting system: Party-list proportional representation
- Last election: 17 September 2023
- Next election: 2028

Meeting place
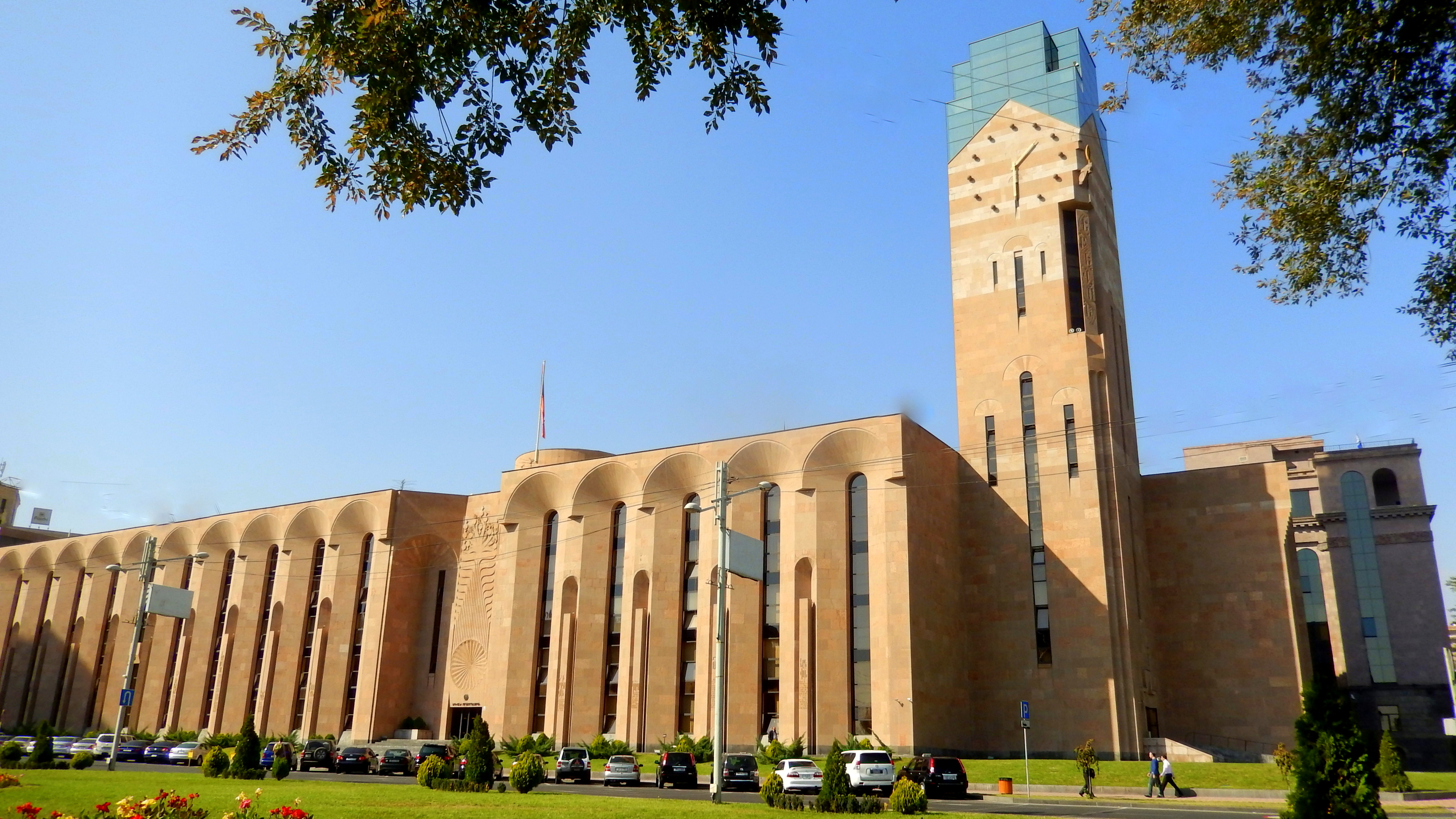
- Yerevan City Hall; 1 Argishti Street; Yerevan, 0015; Armenia

Website
- https://www.yerevan.am/hy/avagani/

The Yerevan City Council (Armenian: Երևան քաղաքի ավագանի, romanized: Yerevan k’aghak’i avagani, lit. 'Yerevan Council of Elders') is the lawmaking body of the city of Yerevan, the capital and largest city of Armenia. It has 65 members elected by party-list proportional representation system, headed by the Mayor of Yerevan.

The council monitors performance of city agencies and makes land use decisions, as well as, legislating on a variety of other issues. The city council also has sole responsibility for approving the city budget and each member is limited to three consecutive terms in office and can run again after a four-year respite.

== Elections ==
=== Appointment ===
"Yerevan City Council elections are being conducted every five years with proportional lists of parties. The City Council has 65 members. The first person in the list of the party that has received more than 40% of seats, is considered elected mayor. If the parties fail to gather so many votes, the mayor will be elected by City Council."

=== Past elections ===
- Yerevan City Council election, 2009
- Yerevan City Council election, 2013
- Yerevan City Council election, 2017
- Yerevan City Council election, 2018

=== Most recent election ===
- Yerevan City Council election, 2023

=== Upcoming elections ===
Next municipal elections are scheduled to be held in 2028.

== Former members of the Yerevan City Council ==
- Republican Party of Armenia
- Prosperous Armenia Party
- Armenian National Congress
- Hello Yerevan Alliance
- Way Out Alliance
- Apricot Country Party
- My Step Alliance
- Bright Alliance

== Yerevan City Hall ==
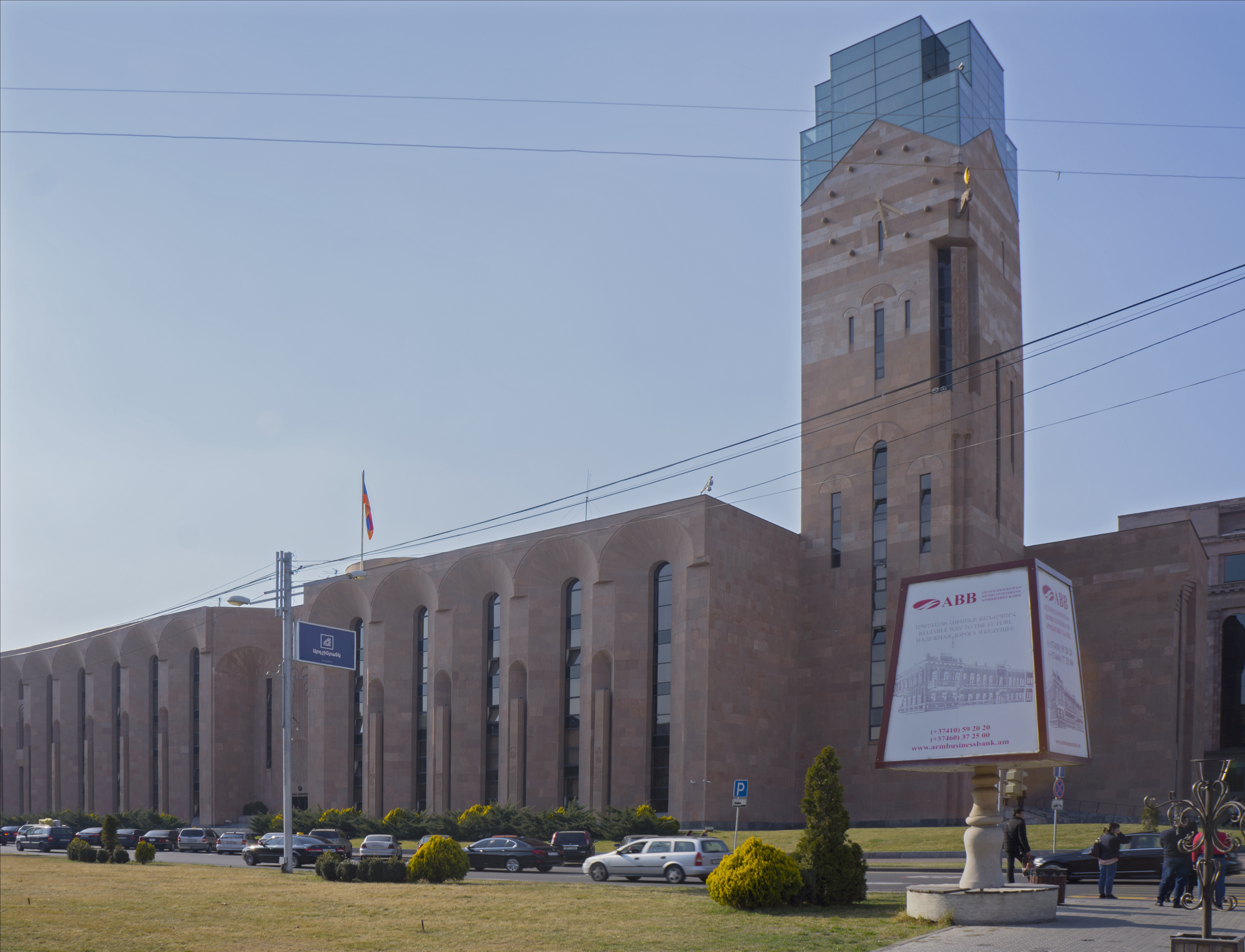
Yerevan city hall

The seat of the Yerevan City Council is the Yerevan City Hall located on Argishti street at the Kentron district, facing the Square of Russia, the House of Moscow and the Yerevan Ararat Wine Factory. The construction of the building was completed in November 2004 during the period of Mayor Yervand Zakharyan, with a cost of AMD 3.1 billion. It was originally designed by architect Jim Torosyan. The construction was set at the beginning of the 1980s but stopped in 1991 due to financial difficulties. It remained unfinished until August 2003 when the construction process was continued and completed within 15 months.

The city hall is a five-story building with a total area of 13,500 m^{2}. The main entrance is topped with the traditional Armenian symbol of endless circles representing the eternity and the ancient Armenian Kenats Tsar tree representing life. It has a 47-metre-high rectangular clock tower with the word "ԵՐԵՎԱՆ" (YEREVAN) carved in Armenian script, decorated with traditional ornaments. The tower is surrounded with glassy walls at its top. The Yerevan History Museum is located in an attached building just to the west of the city hall.

== See also ==
- City hall
- List of city and town halls
- Politics of Armenia
