= 2017 Armenian parliamentary election =

Parliamentary election in Armenia

- 2 April 2017
- All 105 seats in the National Assembly; 53 seats needed for a majority
- Turnout: 60.86%
Party	Leader	Vote %	Seats	+/–
Republican	Vigen Sargsyan	49.17	58	−11
Tsarukyan Alliance	Gagik Tsarukyan	27.35	31	−2
Way Out Alliance	Edmon Marukyan	7.78	9	New
ARF	Armen Rustamyan	6.58	7	+2
This lists parties that won seats. See the complete results below.
Prime Minister before	Prime Minister after
Karen Karapetyan; Republican	Karen Karapetyan; Republican

Parliamentary elections were held in Armenia on 2 April 2017. They were the first elections after a constitutional referendum in 2015 that approved reforms for the country to become a parliamentary republic. The result was a victory for the ruling Republican Party of Armenia, which won 58 of the 105 seats in the National Assembly.

== Electoral system ==
At the time of the previous elections in 2012, the National Assembly had 131 seats, of which 41 were elected in single-member constituencies by first-past-the-post voting and 90 by proportional representation in a single nationwide constituency with an electoral threshold of 5%.

However, a referendum in December 2015 approved constitutional amendments reducing the minimum number of seats in the National Assembly to 101, all of which will be elected by party-list proportional representation, with seats allocated using the d'Hondt method and an election threshold of 5% for parties and 7% for multi-party alliances.

The ballot paper has two sections; one of which is a closed list of candidates for the party at the national level and the other an open list of candidates for the constituency (of which there are 13) that the voter is voting in. Voters vote for a party at the national level and can also give a preference vote to any of candidates of the same party in a district list. Seats are allocated to parties using the share of the vote at the national level, with half awarded to those in the national list and half to those who receive the most preference votes in the district lists. Four seats are reserved for national minorities (Assyrians, Kurds, Russians and Yazidis), with parties having separate lists for the four groups. A party list can not include over 70% of representatives of the same sex, and any there cannot be four consecutive members of one sex on a nationwide party list.

If a party receives a majority of the vote but gets less than 54% of the seats, they will be awarded additional seats to give them 54% of the total. If a party wins over two-thirds of seats, the losing parties will be given extra seats reducing the share of seats of winning party to two-thirds. If a government is not formed within six days of the preliminary results being released, a run-off round of voting between the top two parties must be held within 28 days. A party winning the run-off will be given the seats required for a 54% majority, with all seats allocated in the first round are preserved.

== List of participating parties and alliances ==
The following parties and electoral alliances participated in the election:

#	Party or alliance	Composition	Head of electoral list	Seats held	European affiliation	Slogan
1	Way Out Alliance	Bright Armenia, Hanrapetutyun Party, Civil Contract	Edmon Marukyan	2 / 131		Election, change, victory (Armenian: Ընտրություն, փոփոխություն, հաղթանակ)
2	Free Democrats	Free Democrats, Freedom Party	Khachatur Kokobelyan	3 / 131		We can (Armenian: Մենք կարող ենք)
3	Armenian Renaissance	Orinats Yerkir, Unified Armenians Party	Artur Baghdasaryan	5 / 131	EPP (observer)	Vote for change, vote for renaissance (Armenian: Քվեարկիր հանուն փոփոխության, քվեարկիր հանուն վերածննդի)
4	Tsarukyan Alliance	Prosperous Armenia, Alliance Party, Mission Party	Gagik Tsarukyan	33 / 131	ACRE	Time to change and build (Armenian: Փոփոխությունների և կառուցելու ժամանակն է)
5	ANC-PPA alliance	Armenian National Congress, People's Party of Armenia	Levon Ter-Petrosyan	7 / 131	ALDE	Peace, reconciliation, neighborliness (Armenian: Խաղաղություն, հաշտություն, բարիդրացիություն)
6	Republican Party of Armenia		Vigen Sargsyan	69 / 131	EPP (observer)	Security and progress (Armenian: Անվտանգություն եւ առաջընթաց)
7	Armenian Communist Party		Tachat Sargsyan	0 / 131		Motherland, socialism, labour (Armenian: Հայրենիք, սոցիալիզմ, աշխատանք)
8	ORO Alliance (Ohanyan-Raffi-Oskanian)	Seyran Ohanyan, Heritage party (Raffi Hovannisian), Unity party (Vartan Oskanian)	Seyran Ohanyan	4 / 131	EPP (observer)	Heritage, unity, victory (Armenian: Ժառանգություն, համխմբում, հաղթանակ)
9	Armenian Revolutionary Federation		Armen Rustamyan	5 / 131	PES (observer)	A new beginning, a just Armenia (Armenian: Նոր սկիզբ, արդար Հայաստան)

== Opinion polls ==
Date	Pollster	RPA	TA (PAP)	YELQ	ARF	FD	OEK-UAP	ANC-PPA	ORO	HKK
18–27 March 2017	ASA & BS/Gallup	30	29	9	7	3	5	4	4	3
12–19 March 2017	Gallup	29.4	28.2	6.1	4.8	4.4	3.4	2.9	2.5	1.2
23 February–2 March 2017	Gallup	22.8	26.4	4.3	3.9	3.4	2.7	2.6	1.8	1.0

== Conduct ==
The OSCE criticised the election by saying it had been tainted by vote-buying, and pressure on civil servants and employees of private companies. Transparency International, along with various other organizations, confirmed cases of bribe distribution.

For the first time in Armenian elections, a voter authentication system was used. On election day, all voters were identified through the use of Voter Authentication Devices (VADs), which contained an electronic copy of the voter lists. Voters' fingerprints were also scanned and the Central Electoral Commission (CEC) stated that it would conduct cross-checks to identify potential cases of multiple voting if any complaints were raised. The introduction of the technology was supported by the opposition and civil society groups.

In February 2017 the CEC tested the new devices, which were provided by the UNDP electoral assistance project, funded by the European Union, United States, Germany, United Kingdom and the Armenian government.

According to final reports from the International Elections Observation Missions (IEOM), "the VADs functioned effectively and without significant issues." Observers reported the introduction of the VADs was welcomed by most IEOM interlocutors as a useful tool for building confidence in the integrity of election day proceedings. However, they mentioned in the final report that the late introduction of the VADs could have led to a limited time for testing of equipment and training of operators, stating "Observers noted some problems with scanning of ID documents and fingerprints; however, this did not lead to significant disruptions of voting. IEOM observers noted 9 cases of voters attempting multiple voting that were captured by the VADs. The VADs provided the possibility for voters to be redirected, in case they were registered in another polling station in the same TEC, and this was observed in 55 polling stations."

== Results ==
Party	Votes	%	Seats	+/–
Republican Party	771,247	49.17	58	–11
Tsarukyan Alliance	428,965	27.35	31	–2
Way Out Alliance	122,049	7.78	9	New
Armenian Revolutionary Federation	103,173	6.58	7	+2
Armenian Renaissance	58,277	3.72	0	–6
ORO Alliance (Ohanyan-Raffi-Oskanian)	32,504	2.07	0	–5
ANC–PPA Alliance	25,975	1.66	0	–7
Free Democrats	14,746	0.94	0	New
Armenian Communist Party	11,745	0.75	0	0
Total	1,568,681	100.00	105	–26
Valid votes	1,568,681	99.57		
Invalid/blank votes	6,701	0.43		
Total votes	1,575,382	100.00		
Registered voters/turnout	2,588,590	60.86		
Source: CEC Panorama

=== By electoral district ===
Electoral district	Way Out	Free Dem.	Arm. Ren.	PAP	ANC	RPA	Comm.	ORO	ARF	Total votes cast	Registered voters	Turnout
1 - Yerevan Districts Avan, Nor Nork & Kanaker-Zeytun	13.3%	1.3%	4.8%	18.8%	1.7%	50.7%	1.1%	2.3%	6.0%	120,409	200,219	60.1%
2 - Yerevan Districts Ajapnyak, Arabkir & Davtashen	15.5%	1.5%	2.3%	23.1%	3.8%	45.8%	1.1%	2.0%	5.0%	125,885	212,523	59.2%
3 - Yerevan Districts Malatia-Sebastia & Shengavit	13.0%	1.7%	3.4%	19.3%	2.3%	53.1%	1.3%	1.7%	4.2%	130,249	224,322	58.1%
4 - Yerevan Districts Erebuni, Kentron, Nork-Marash & Nubarashen	14.8%	1.9%	2.4%	23.7%	2.5%	46.2%	1.3%	2.3%	4.9%	115,206	208,746	55.2%
5 - Ararat	4.4%	0.4%	1.6%	35.4%	0.7%	51.8%	0.3%	0.5%	4.9%	151,297	221,507	68.3%
6 - Armavir	4.8%	0.7%	3.7%	24.3%	1.1%	53.1%	0.8%	2.4%	9.0%	128,339	232,010	55.3%
7 - Aragatsotn	2.3%	0.3%	5.0%	30.3%	2.2%	44.5%	0.6%	3.6%	11.2%	76,397	116,816	65.4%
8 - Gegharkunik	2.6%	0.4%	3.9%	30.3%	0.9%	52.6%	0.4%	1.9%	7.1%	127,915	191,672	66.7%
9 - Lori	8.6%	0.5%	2.6%	18.5%	1.7%	62.2%	0.5%	1.4%	4.0%	137,758	238,291	57.8%
10 - Kotayk	8.7%	0.6%	2.3%	43.9%	1.4%	34.6%	0.8%	2.9%	4.7%	139,666	238,421	58.6%
11 - Shirak	3.2%	0.6%	10.4%	32.2%	1.1%	40.6%	0.5%	2.1%	9.3%	132,709	230,701	57.5%
12 - Vayots Dzor and Syunik	3.2%	0.7%	2.8%	29.0%	1.1%	53.7%	0.5%	1.9%	7.3%	108,338	162,456	66.7%
13 - Tavush	4.1%	2.1%	3.9%	23.3%	1.5%	48.1%	0.5%	3.5%	13.1%	72,715	110,037	66.1%
Source: CEC

== See also ==
- Politics of Armenia
- Programs of political parties in Armenia
