= Programs of political parties in Armenia =

Political parties in West Asian country

This article lists political parties of the National Assembly of Armenia and represents their programs. Armenia became an independent state in 1991, following the collapse of the Soviet Union. Since then, many political parties have been formed, who mainly work with each other to form coalition governments. The country has a multi-party system.

== Armenian Revolutionary Federation ==
The Armenian Revolutionary Federation is a centre-left party which was founded in 1890, it is an observer member of the Party of European Socialists. The party currently has 10 seats in the National Assembly.

== Bright Armenia ==
Bright Armenia is a classical liberal political party founded in 2015. Following the 2018 Armenian parliamentary election, the party emerged as the third largest in the National Assembly with 18 seats. The party is a member of the Alliance of Liberals and Democrats for Europe Party and maintains a pro-European ideology and opposes Armenia's membership in the Eurasian Economic Union. The party wishes to renegotiate an Association Agreement and a Deep and Comprehensive Free Trade Area with the EU instead. Following the 2021 Armenian parliamentary elections, the party lost all political representation in the National Assembly.

== Civil Contract ==
In December 2016, the Way Out Alliance, emerged as a liberal political alliance in Armenia. The alliance had a pro-European orientation and believed that Armenia should have closer relations with the European Union. As a result of the 2018 Armenian protests, Nikol Pashinyan was appointed Prime Minister of Armenia and his party, Civil Contract, was a member of the Way Out Alliance coalition. The alliance had officially dissolved prior to the 2018 Parliamentary elections. Afterwards, Nikol Pashinyan's Civil Contract party had formed the My Step Alliance with the Mission Party, in August 2018. The alliance won a clear majority in the National Assembly following the 2018 Parliamentary elections. The alliance claimed 88 seats and Pashinyan retained his title as prime minister. Following Pashinyan's victory, he confirmed that although relations with the EU should be strengthened, he would not withdraw Armenia's membership from the Eurasian Economic Union, despite making previous statements questioning Armenia's membership. In the 2021 Armenian parliamentary elections, Civil Contract ran independently and won 61 seats in the National Assembly. Pashinyan and his party maintains a centrist, big tent ideology.

== European Party of Armenia ==
The European Party of Armenia is a pro-European party established on 6 November 2018. The current leader is Tigran Khzmalyan. The party maintains a liberal ideology, is staunchly anti-Russian and believes that Armenia's future should be connected with Europe. The party manifesto calls for the government to begin membership negotiations with the European Union and NATO, while also supporting the withdrawal of Armenia from the Collective Security Treaty Organization and the Eurasian Economic Union. The party has no representatives in the National Assembly.

== Hanrapetutyun Party ==
The Hanrapetutyun Party is a centrist, pro-European political party in Armenia. The party was founded in 2001 by former members of the Republican Party of Armenia. Prior to the 2018 Armenian parliamentary election, the party formed the We Alliance with the Free Democrats, another pro-European political party in Armenia. However, the alliance received just 2% of the vote. As this was lower than the 5% minimum threshold required, the We Alliance of Hanrapetutyn and the Free Democrats failed to gain representation in the National Assembly. The alliance subsequently dissolved.

== Heritage ==
Heritage is a centre-right political party founded in 2002. Its leader is Raffi Hovannisian. The party is a pro-Western and pro-European party. It holds observer member status in the European People's Party. The party favors integration of Armenia into the European Union and ultimate accession. The party however did not participate in the 2018 parliamentary elections.

== Homeland Party ==
The Homeland Party is a centre-right political party in Armenia. It was founded on 30 May 2020 by Artur Vanetsyan. The party has no representation in the National Assembly.

== National Progress Party of Armenia ==
The National Progress Party of Armenia is a left-wing political party in Armenia, founded on October 3, 2018 by a group of political activists following the 2018 Armenian Velvet Revolution. The party announced social liberalism and direct-democracy as its principal ideology and was formerly the only party whose list of candidates was headed by a woman, Lusine Haroyan. Haroyan stated during an interview that the party considers the role women play in politics is very important and the NPP has the most women on their list from all the political forces participating in the elections, with 43 out of the 83-person list being women. The party advocates for maintaining strong relations with the European Union, the United States, and Russia.

== One Armenia Party ==
One Armenia Party is a centrist political party. It was founded on 19 February 2019 by Arthur Ghazinian. The party has no representation in the National Assembly.

== Prosperous Armenia Party ==
The Prosperous Armenia party was formed in 2004 and its leader is Gagik Tsarukyan. There is a debate whether Robert Kocharyan, the second president of Armenia, has a strong influence over the party. The party currently has no seats in the National Assembly. The party was formerly a member of the Alliance of Conservatives and Reformists in Europe and maintains a Eurosceptic and Pro-Russian ideology. The party supports Armenia's membership in the Eurasian Economic Union.

== Reborn Armenia ==
Reborn Armenia, also translated as Resurgent Armenia and Reviving Armenia, was founded on 20 March 2021 and is currently led by Vahe A. Hakobyan. The party has no seats in the National Assembly.

== Republican Party of Armenia ==
The Republican Party of Armenia was the main ruling party in Armenia from 1999 to 2018. The party was founded in 1990, its leader is Serzh Sargsyan. The party has 4 seats in the National Assembly. The party maintains a right-wing ideology and is an observer member of the European People's Party.

== Rule of Law ==
The Rule of Law party is a centre-right political party, led by Artur Baghdasarian. In the 2007 Armenian parliamentary elections, it only obtained 9 seats in parliament, in contrast to 19 seats in the 2003 elections.

Baghdasaryan stated that "Armenia's membership in the European Union should be one of the key priorities of our country's present and future foreign policy, as EU membership will open new avenues for Armenia." The party is an observer member of the European People's Party.

In the February 2008 presidential election, Baghdasarian was the party's candidate; he placed third with 17.7% of the vote according to final official results.

The Rule of Law party failed to receive any seats in the National Assembly following the 2018 parliamentary elections.

== Sasna Tsrer Pan-Armenian Party ==
The Sasna Tsrer Pan-Armenian Party is an Armenian nationalist political party that was founded in September 2018 during the Velvet Revolution. The party calls for unification of Armenia and neighboring Republic of Artsakh. The party maintains an anti-Russian stance and supports the withdrawal of Armenia from both the Eurasian Economic Union and the Collective Security Treaty Organization. Party members advocate for a strategic alliance with the United States and the European Union. Sasna Tsrer participated in the 2018 parliamentary elections but failed to gain any representation in the National Assembly. The party is a member of the National Democratic Pole.

== United Labour Party ==
The United Labour Party is a social-democratic political party. It is led by Gurgen Arsenyan. The party has one seat in the National Assembly.

== See also ==
- Armenia–European Union relations
- Elections in Armenia
- Foreign relations of Armenia
- Liberalism in Armenia
- List of political parties in Armenia
- List of political parties in Artsakh
- List of political parties in Eastern Europe
- Politics of Armenia
- Politics of Europe
- Table of political parties in Europe by pancontinental organisation
