= Saint Gregory the Illuminator Cathedral, Yerevan =

Cathedral of the Armenian Apostolic Church

Saint Gregory the Illuminator Cathedral

Religion
- Affiliation: Armenian Apostolic Church
- Ecclesiastical or organisational status: Active
- Leadership: Catholicos of All Armenians
- Year consecrated: September 23, 2001

Location
- Location: Tigran Mets Avenue, Kentron, Yerevan, Armenia
- Interactive map of Saint Gregory the Illuminator Cathedral
- Coordinates: 40°10′19″N 44°31′01″E

Architecture
- Architect: Stepan Kurkchyan
- Type: Church
- Style: Armenian
- Groundbreaking: 1997
- Completed: 2001

Specifications
- Capacity: 1700
- Height (max): 60 metres (200 ft)

The Saint Gregory the Illuminator Cathedral (Armenian: Սուրբ Գրիգոր Լուսավորիչ մայր եկեղեցի, Surb Grigor Lusavorich mayr yekeghetsi), also known as the Yerevan Cathedral, is the largest cathedral of the Armenian Apostolic Church. It is located in the Kentron District (Central District) of Yerevan, the capital of Armenia, and is one of the largest religious buildings in the South Caucasus along with the Holy Trinity Cathedral of Tbilisi (known as the Sameba Cathedral). Adjacent to the General Andranik metro station, it is visible from many areas of Yerevan.

== History ==
The cathedral was constructed by the initiative of Catholicos Vazgen I. Its construction started on April 7, 1997, with a ground blessing service conducted by Catholicos Karekin I. The church complex was designed by the architect Stepan Kurkchyan and the construction was completed in 2001.

The consecration of the cathedral took place on September 23, 2001, on occasion of the 1700th anniversary of the proclamation of Christianity as the state religion of Armenia. The cathedral houses the relics of Saint Gregory the Illuminator and the Holy Remains of St. Gregory that were brought from Naples, Italy. Shortly after the consecration of the cathedral, Pope John Paul II paid a visit to the cathedral.

== Architecture ==
The huge cathedral is a complex consisting of three churches: the cathedral (main church) with 1700 seats and the chapels of Saint Tiridates the King and of Saint Ashkhen the Queen (both with 150 seats). These two royal figures were the crucial helpers of St. Gregory in converting Armenia to Christianity. The belfry tower (which consists of more than 30 arches) and the court are located at the entrance of the cathedral. Halls for receptions and church-related activities are provided on the lower floor of the main church.

The total area of the complex is around 3,822 square meters, while the height of the cathedral from the ground to the top of the cross is 54 meters.

The narthex before the main church's nave contains Saint Gregory's reliquary.

The main church of the complex was built by the donation of Richard Alexander Manoogian and Louise Manoogian Simone, in the memory of their deceased father, philanthropist, entrepreneur and former AGBU President Alex Manoogian and his wife Marie Manoogian. On the other hand, the construction of the two chapels of the complex was completed by the donation of Nazar and Artemis Nazarian and Kevork and Linda Kevorkian, while the belfry was erected by the donation of Eduardo Eurnekian.

It was one of the first churches in Armenia to introduce seats, and an enormous church by Armenian standards. Candles are forbidden and may only be lit in a separate building on the southeast side. There is an organ and the cathedral is well lit.

== Gallery ==
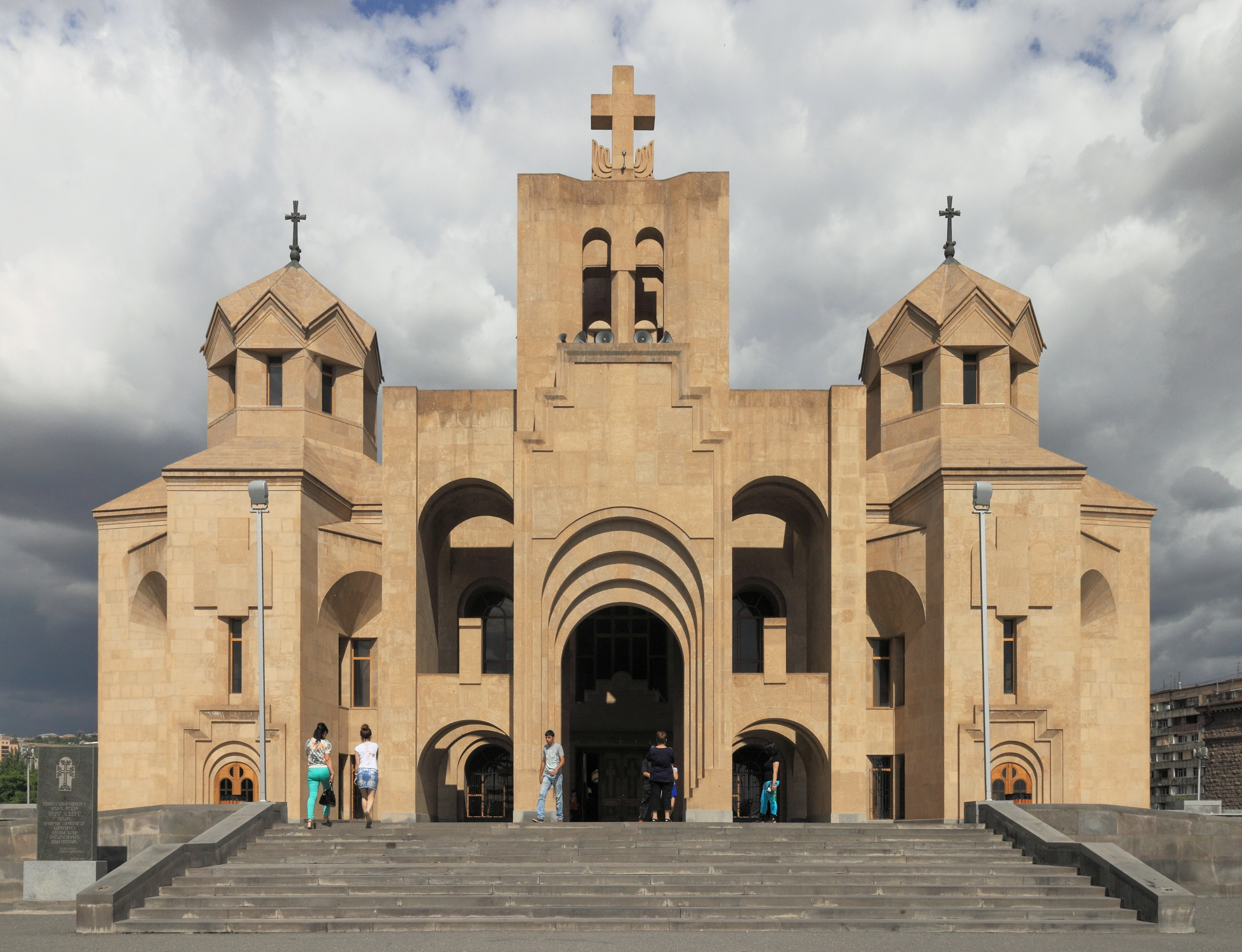
The cathedral is built from orange-coloured tufa stones from Ani

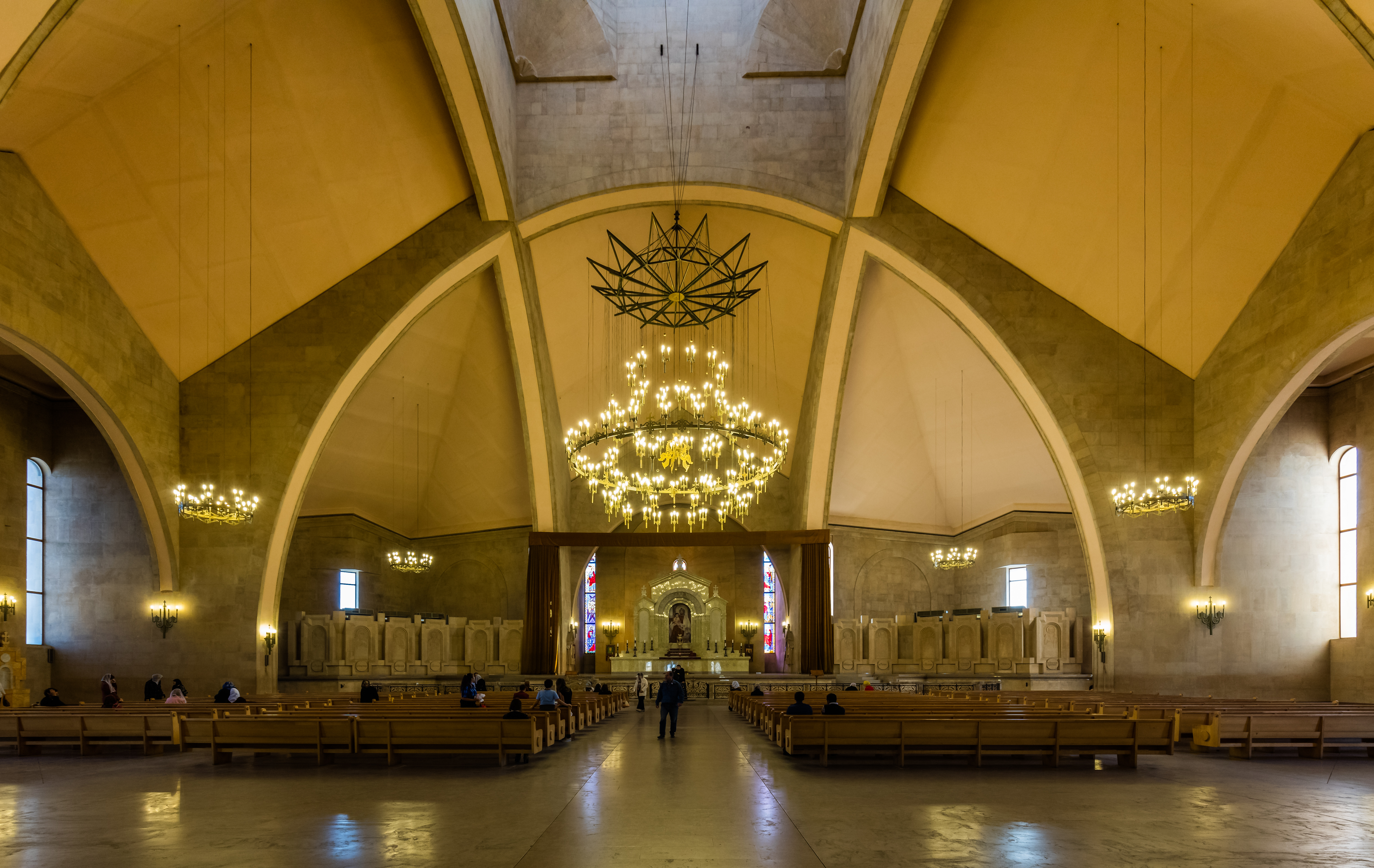

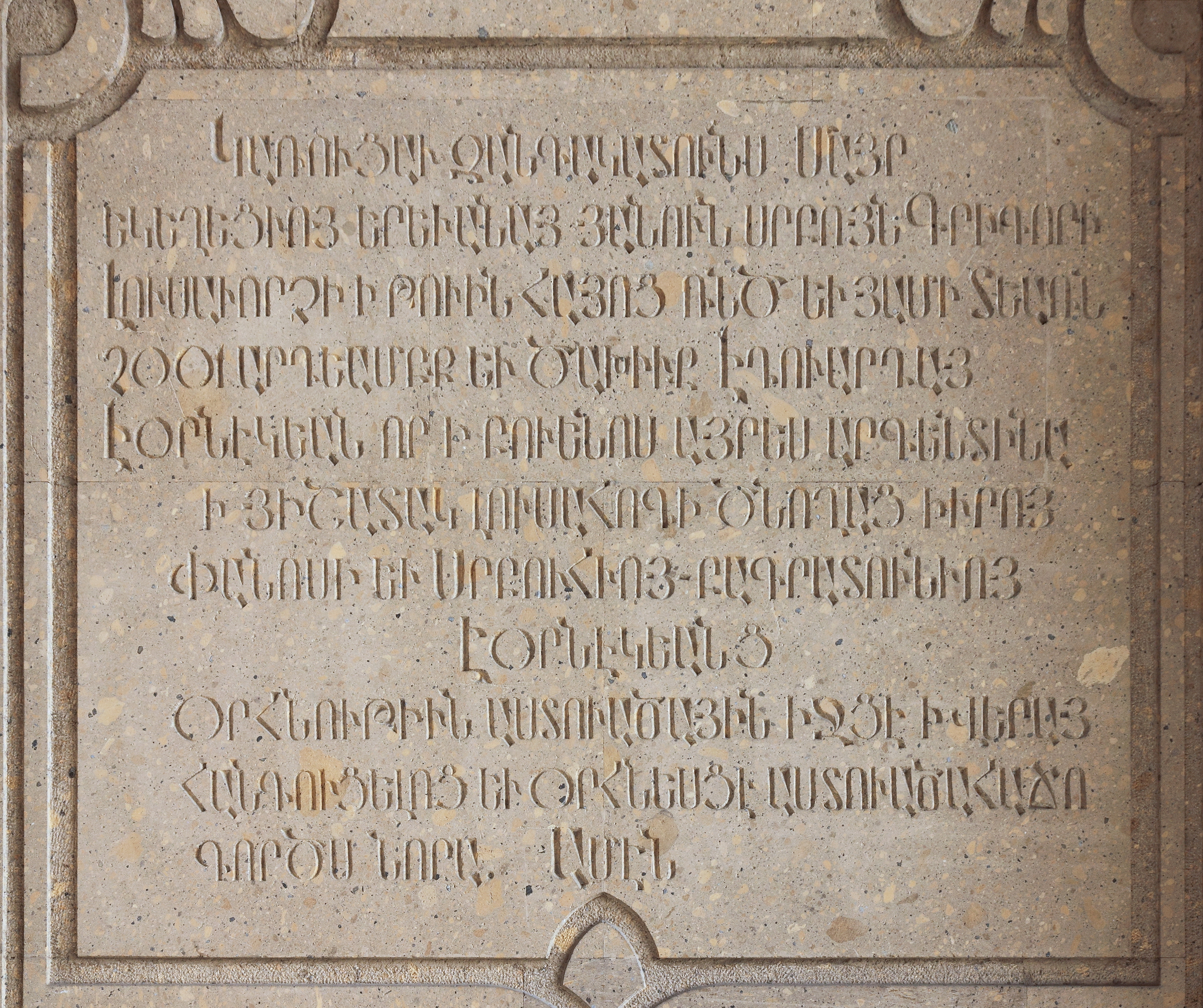
The stone slab with an inscription in Armenian language

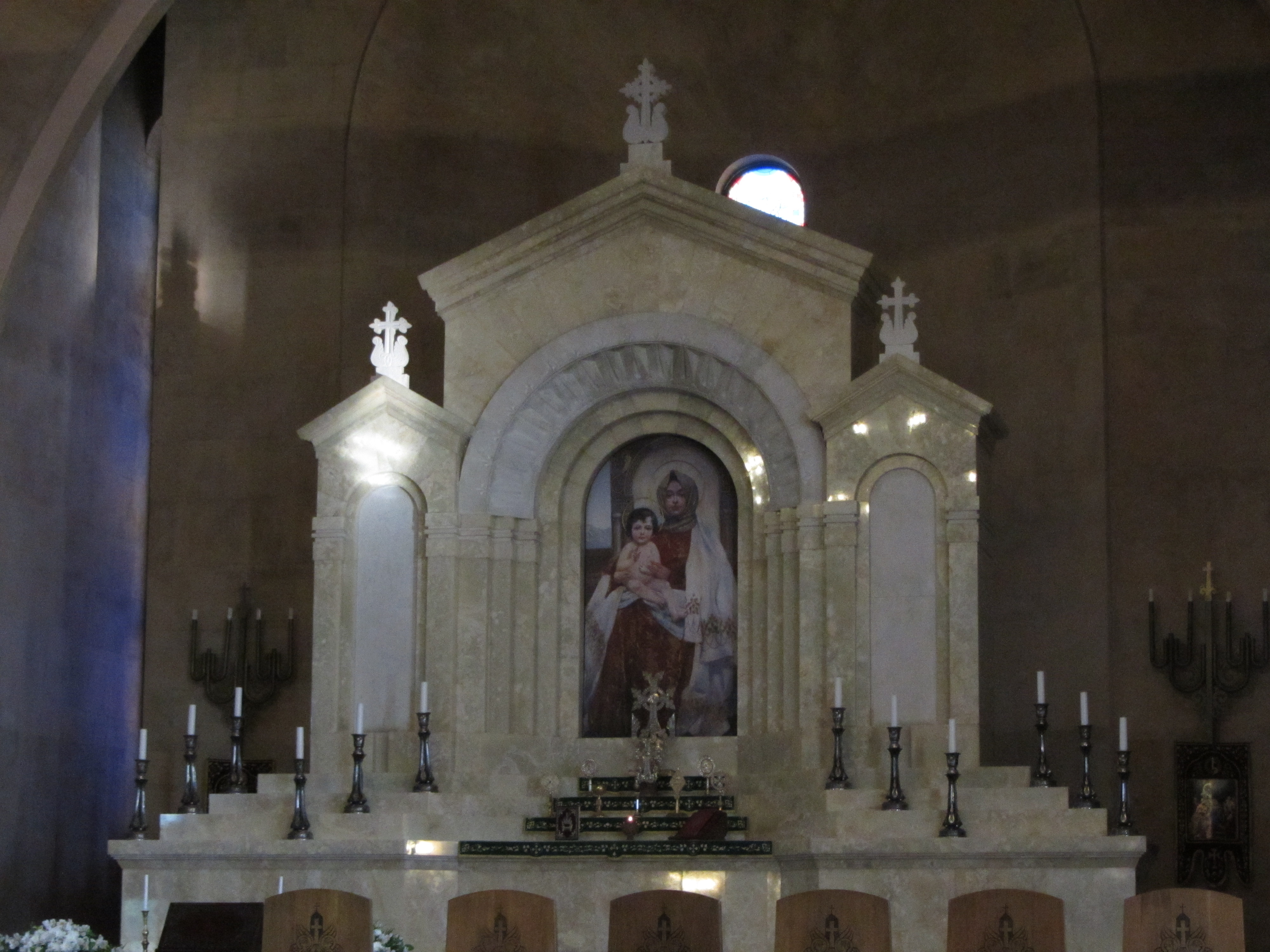
Saint Gregory the Illuminator Cathedral, Altar

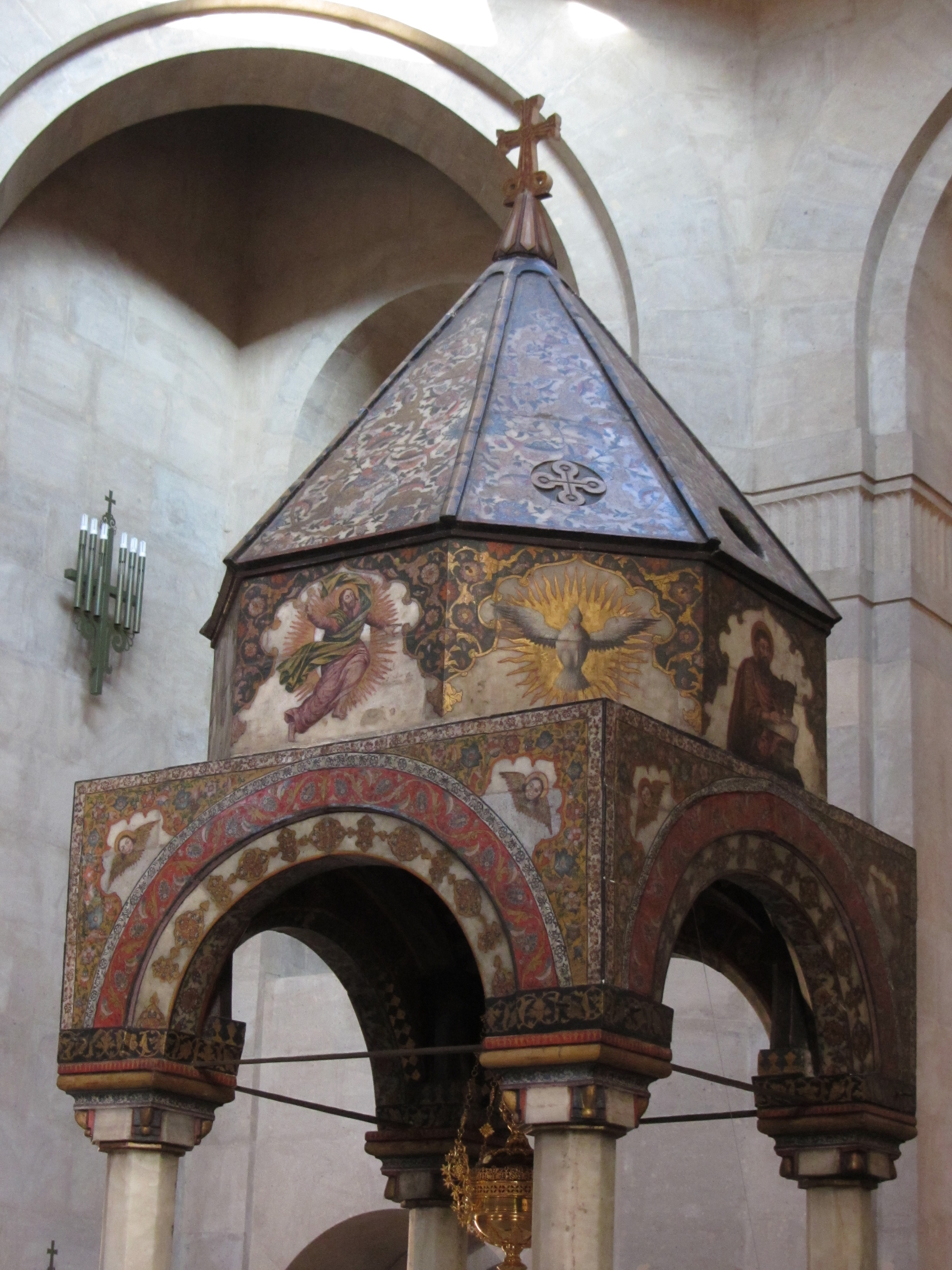
Saint Gregory the Illuminator Cathedral

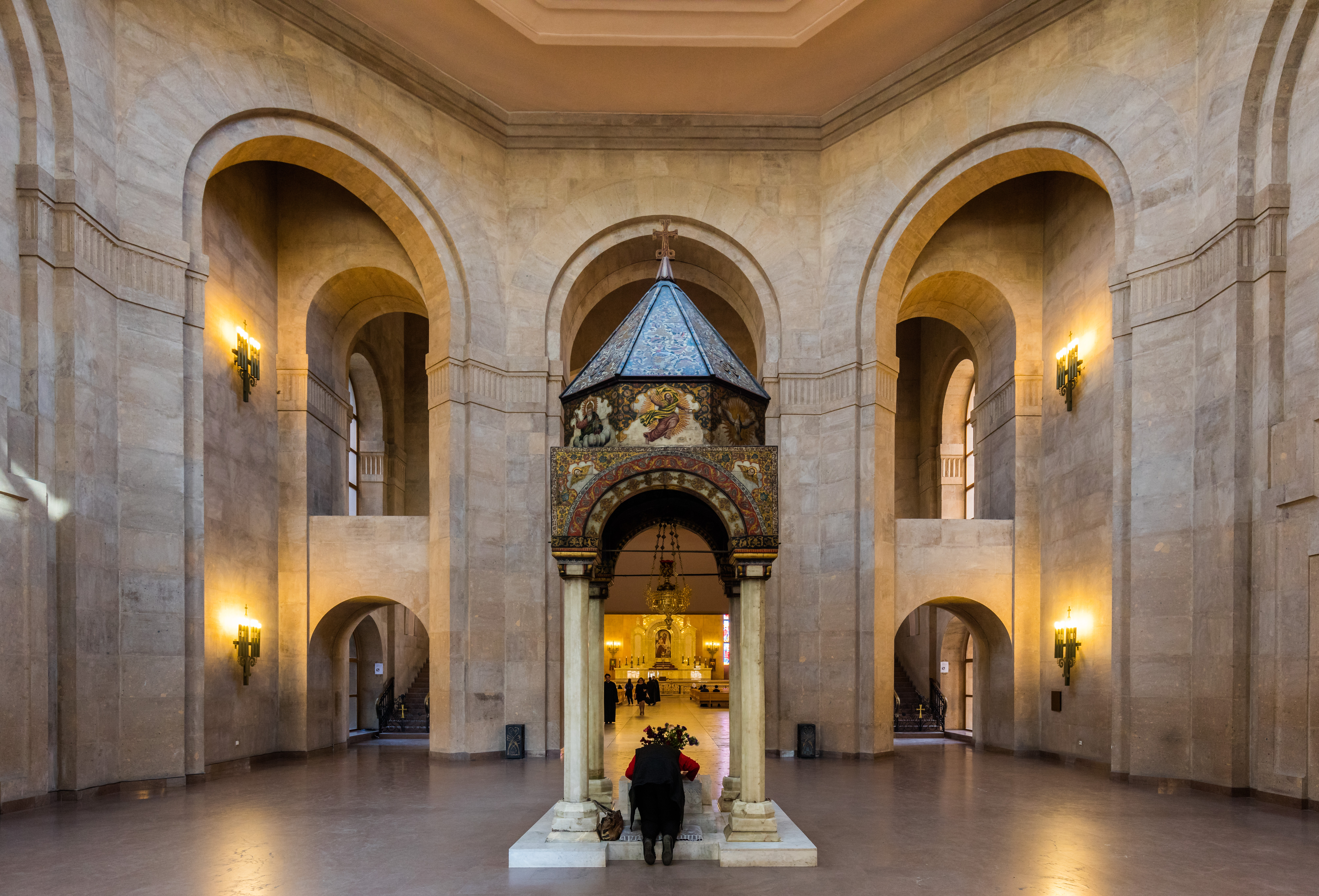
Saint Gregory the Illuminator Cathedral

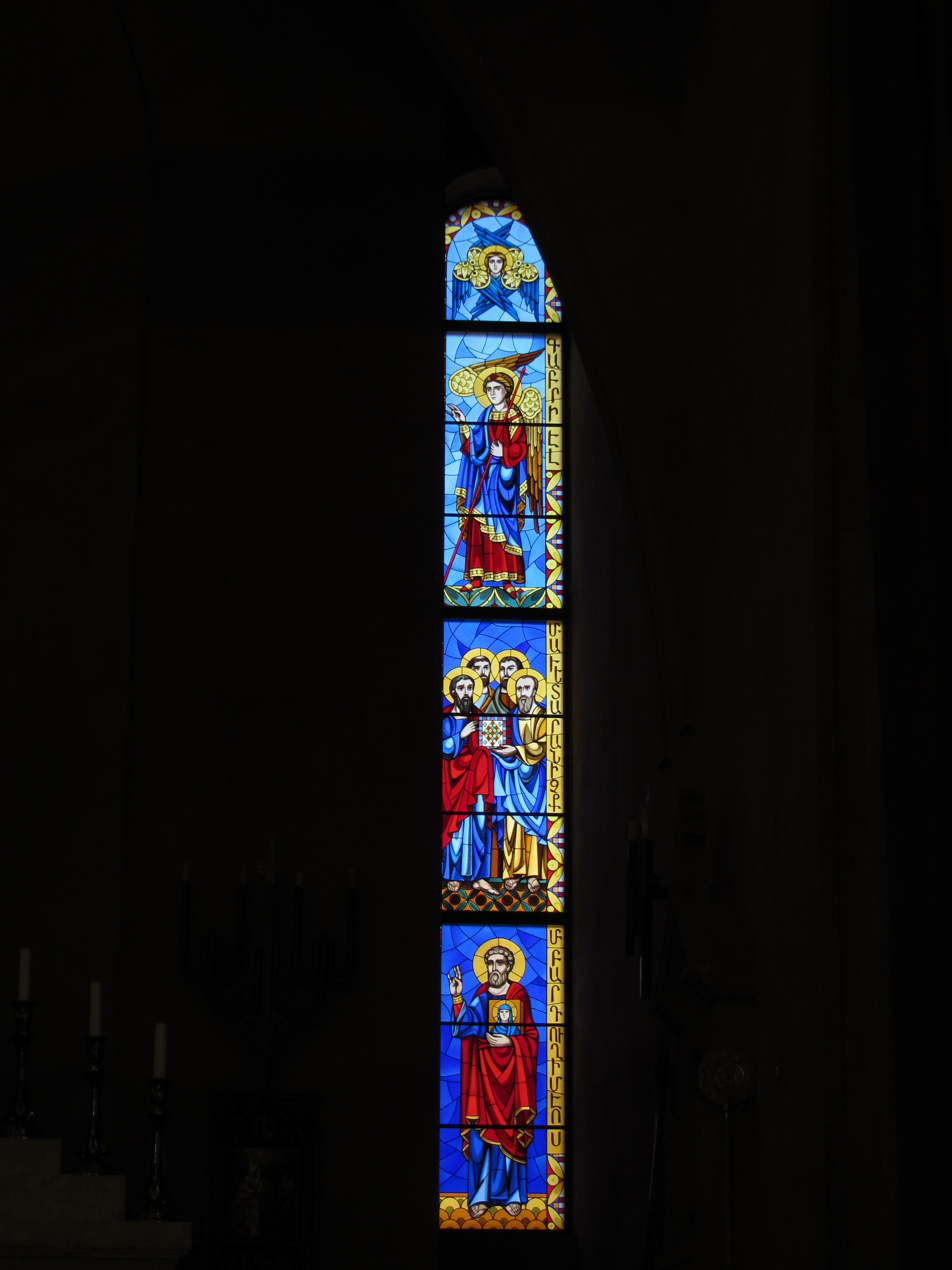
Saint Gregory the Illuminator Cathedral, stained-glass window

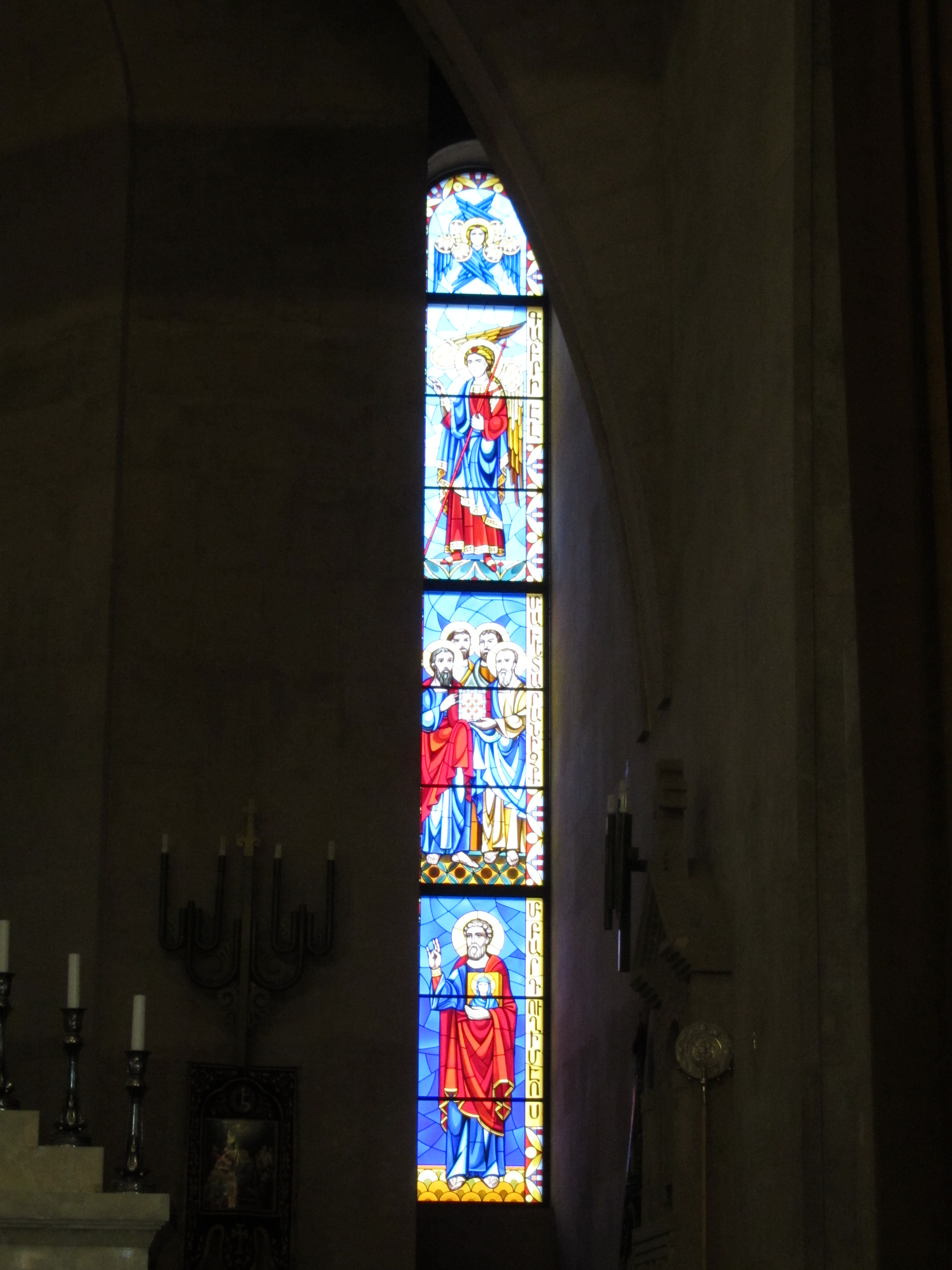
Saint Gregory the Illuminator Cathedral, stained-glass window

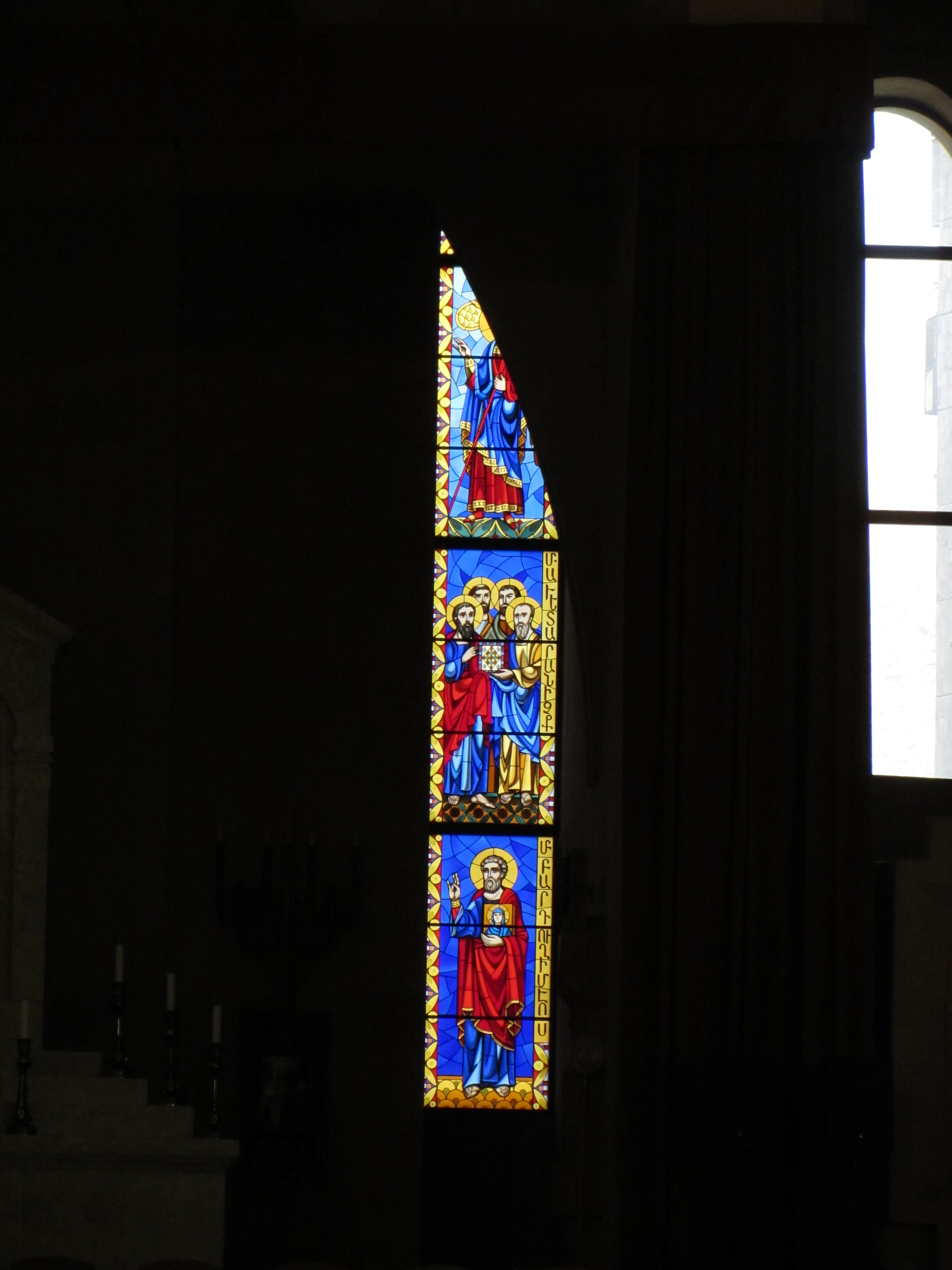
Saint Gregory the Illuminator Cathedral, stained-glass window

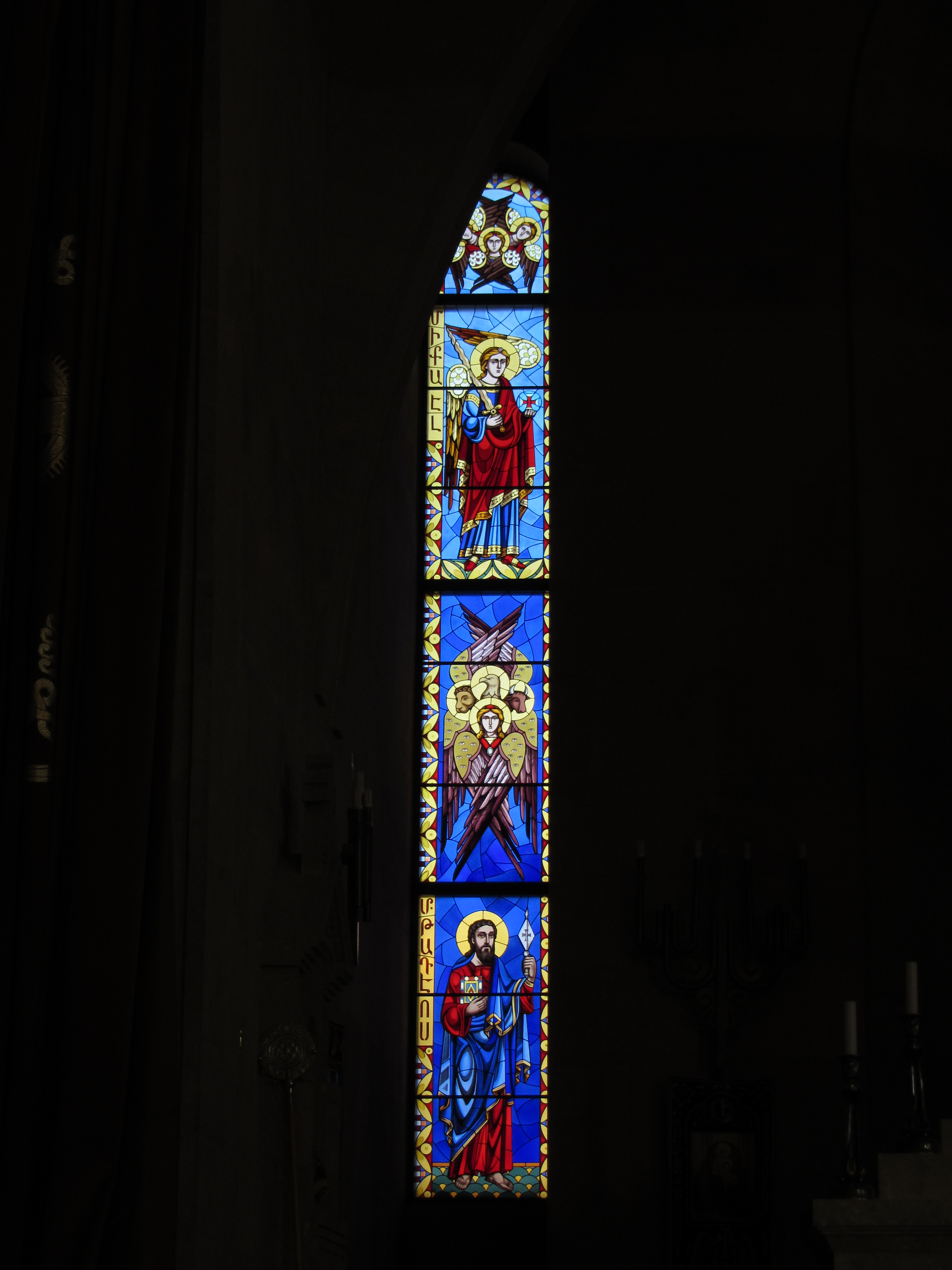
Saint Gregory the Illuminator Cathedral, stained-glass window
