= Nubar =

- Pronunciation: Armenian: [nuˈbɑɾ]
- Gender: Male
- Language: Armenian

Origin
- Language: Persian
- Meaning: new fruit
- Region of origin: Armenia

Nubar (Eastern Armenian: Նուբար, Western Armenian: Նուպար) is an Armenian masculine given name. It is derived from Persian نوبر (nowbar, “freshly ripened fruit, first fruit”), consisting of نو (now, “new”) and بر (bar, “fruit”). It is attested since the 15th century.

Notable people with the name include:

- Noubar Afeyan (born 1962), Armenian businessman and philanthropist
- Nubar Alexanian (born 1950), American-Armenian documentary photographer
- Nubar Gulbenkian (1896–1972), Armenian business magnate and socialite
- Nubar Pasha (1825–1899), Egyptian politician
- Boghos Nubar Pasha (1851–1930), Armenian leader
- Zareh Nubar (1883–1963), Armenian leader, son of Boghos Nubar
- Nubar Terziyan (1909–1994), born Nubar Alyanak, Turkish Armenian actor
