= Vartan Oskanian =

Armenian politician

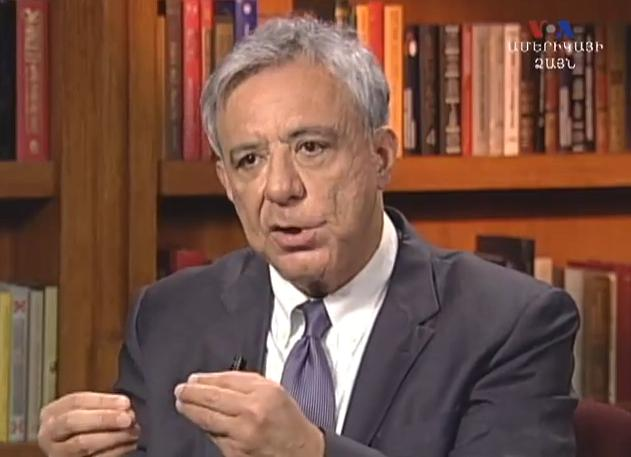
- Oskanian in 2013

Minister of Foreign Affairs of Armenia
- In office February 1998 – April 2008
- President: Robert Kocharyan
- Preceded by: Alexander Arzoumanian
- Succeeded by: Eduard Nalbandyan

Personal details
- Born: 7 February 1955 (age 71) Aleppo, Syria
- Party: Prosperous Armenia (2012–2015); Unity Party (2016–present)
- Education: Yerevan Polytechnic Institute; Tufts University; Harvard University

Vartan Minasi Oskanian (Note: Armenian: Վարդան Մինասի Օսկանյան, romanized: Vardan Minasi Ōskanyan; Western Armenian: Վարդան Մինասի Օսկանեան, romanized: Vartan Minasi Ōsganean) (born February 7, 1955) is an Armenian politician and diplomat who served as the Foreign Minister of Armenia from 1998 to 2008 under President Robert Kocharyan. He is the founder of the Civilitas Foundation.

== Early life and career ==
Born into a wealthy Armenian jewelers' family in Syria, Oskanian was educated in the Armenian schools of Aleppo. After graduating from the AGBU Armenian Central High School in 1973, he left Aleppo for Yerevan, where he attended the Yerevan Polytechnic Institute and received a BSc degree in structural engineering. He continued his education with a graduate degree from the Fletcher School of Law and Diplomacy in the United States; his fields of concentration were international monetary theory and policy, and diplomatic history and foreign policies. Oskanian also received degrees from Tufts University and the Harvard Kennedy School of Government. In addition to Armenian, Oskanian speaks English, Arabic, French, Russian and Turkish. In 1990, while finishing his graduate studies, he and a group of friends founded the Armenian International Magazine (AIM) in California. Oskanian was an international trustee of Armenia Fund, an organization that channels aid from the Armenian diaspora to Armenia and Nagorno-Karabakh. He was also president of the Pan-Armenian Games.

== Move to Armenia ==
Oskanian moved to Armenia in 1992, shortly after Armenia's independence, and began work at the foreign ministry, first in the Middle East Department, then as head of the North America Department. In 1994, he became Deputy Minister of Foreign Affairs and in 1996, First Deputy. During those years, Oskanian was a Visiting Assistant Professor at the American University of Armenia, where he taught international relations, international economic relations, and American foreign policy. In 1998, he was appointed Minister of Foreign Affairs by President Robert Kocharyan.

== Term as foreign minister ==
During his time as minister of foreign affairs, Oskanian pursued six main policies. The policy of "complementarity" emphasized inclusion and collaboration between Armenia and its neighbors. It made possible a strategic partnership with Russia, continued membership in the Collective Security Treaty Organization, and brought Armenia's relationship with NATO to a level short of membership. The policy of multilateralism sought consistent engagement in global issues. Next, through promoting Armenia's integration with Europe, Oskanian worked to accelerate integration with the Council of Europe, the European Union and NATO (Armenia received free membership status in the Council of Europe in 2001). In regards Armenia-Diaspora relations, Oskanian established fruitful relationships with Armenian lobbying organizations in the US and Europe, with other Armenian organizations and with individuals, including Tracinda Corporation owner Kirk Kerkorian. For Armenia-Turkey relations, Oskanian's policy insisted on the logic of Armenia's normal relations with Turkey and included early attempts toward protocols between the two states. The sixth major policy was a strategy for the resolution of the Nagorno-Karabakh conflict. On this issue, Oskanian's approach broke significantly from previous policy. He pursued a comprehensive agreement that did not force Nagorno-Karabakh to remain within Azerbaijan. Born of this effort was the classification "de facto independent, de jure not part of Azerbaijan." The efforts of this policy brought about the "Common State Agreement" and the "Key West agreement" (both eventually rejected by Azerbaijan), the "Prague process" in 2004, which involved the OSCE and representatives from France, Russia and the US, and most recently "the Madrid document."

== Political activities ==
In 2012, Oskanian was elected to the National Assembly of Armenia as a candidate for the Prosperous Armenia Party. In October 2012, the National Assembly, then controlled by the Republican Party of Armenia, voted to remove Oskanian's immunity from prosecution. Oskanian was charged with embezzlement and money laundering in connection with a $2 million donation by Jon Huntsman Sr. to Oskanian's Civilitas Foundation. Oskanian considered the criminal case politically motivated and a reaction to his and the Prosperous Armenia Party's criticism of Serzh Sargsyan's administration. Oskanian admitted to inadvertently using some of the donation for personal purposes, and the criminal case was dropped and settled out of court. In March 2015, Oskanian left the Prosperous Armenia Party.

In April 2016, Oskanian founded the Unity Party. The Unity party joined the ORO Alliance, which participated in the 2017 Armenian parliamentary election but did not pass the threshold to enter parliament.

== Other activities ==
In 2008, Oskanian founded the Civilitas Foundation, named after the Latin term for "the citizen's responsibility to society." The Civilitas Foundation has two main programs, "The Democracy and Development Initiative," which works in education, media, rural development and environmental awareness, and "The Council on Foreign Relations," which advocates for peace and stability in the Caucasus through dialogue and open intercourse. The Civilitas Foundation also operates an online media outlet, CivilNet, which produces content in Armenian and English.

== Personal life ==
Vartan Oskanian is married to Dr. Nani Oskanian. They have two sons.

== Publications ==
In 2009, Oskanian published the book Speaking To Be Heard: A Decade of Speeches, also published in Armenian as Anavart Tasnamyak ("Unfinished Decade"). The book collects around one hundred speeches delivered by Oskanian during his time as foreign minister. In 2013, he published his memoirs in Armenian, titled Ankakhutyan Chanaparhov ("On the Path of Independence").

== Articles and Speeches ==
- Turkey misses its chance
- "15 years of Armenian-Chinese diplomatic relations". Archived from the original on 2012-02-24.
- Neurope.eu - News aus Europa - Neurope.eu - News aus Europa
- Statement by H.E. Mr. Vartan Oskanian, Minister of foreign affairs of the Republic of Armenia, at the general debate of the 61st session of the General Assembly of the United Nations

== Notes ==
Political offices
| Preceded by Alexander Arzumanyan | Minister of Foreign Affairs of Armenia; 1998–2008 | Succeeded by Eduard Nalbandyan |
