= Manuel Azadigian =

Armenian-American artist

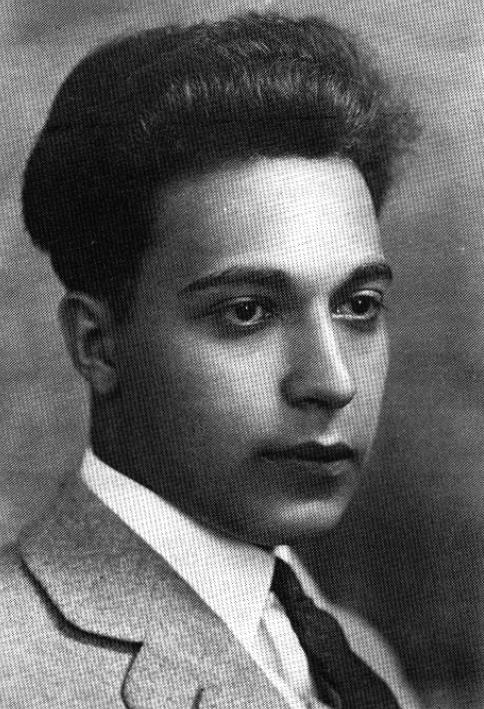
- Manuel Azadigian
- Born: October 15, 1901; Malatya, Ottoman Empire (now Turkey)
- Died: September 17, 1924 (aged 22); Philadelphia, Pennsylvania, United States
- Education: Pennsylvania Academy of the Fine Arts, Académie de la Grande Chaumière
- Known for: Painting
- Notable work: "The Russian Poet" (1921–22)
- Movement: Portraits, Still Life
- Patrons: Arshag Karagheusian

Manuel Azadigian (October 15, 1901 – September 17, 1924) was an Armenian-American painter.

== Early life ==
Manuel Azadigian was born in Malatya in the Ottoman Empire into a moderately influential family of the village on his mother's side. Manuel demonstrated a talent for drawing from his earliest years. By the time of his birth, many of his relatives had already begun immigrating to the United States for a better life and to escape persecution they faced as Armenians. His father, George Azadigian, moved to America in 1908 to prepare the way for his wife and two children, who joined him there in June 1912. The Azadigian family settled in Philadelphia, where his maternal relatives had settled in North Philadelphia, and entered the local public school. He studied there for three years before having to leave school in 1915 at age 13 to help his impoverished family.

== Education ==
After a few years of working, Azadigian was accepted to the Pennsylvania Academy of the Fine Arts where he quickly became one of its best students, finishing the first year of coursework in just two months. These were very difficult times for Manuel, working odd jobs during the day while attending classes at night. He studied painting under the Institute's principle instructor Robert Vonnoh, who later recommended Azadigian as one of his most promising pupils. He was also hailed in a letter from his teacher Daniel Garber as being capable of a very successful career much like his own. Azadigian's oil painting "Still Life" was displayed and sold in 1921 at the Academy's 116th annual exhibition. He also sketched the ancient work from the Parthenon "The Three Fates" from the school's cast collection which was hailed by the school as a perfect copy. He also exhibited with the Society of Independent Artists. His main body of work consisted of still life, portraits, and landscapes.

== Studies in Europe ==
A sepia copy of The Russian Poet, 1923. It was hailed as his masterpiece and praised by Sargent.

After his graduation from the Institute in 1921, Manuel was awarded a scholarship from New York businessman Arshag Karagheusian to study in Paris. He studied at the Académie de la Grande Chaumière and a French article at the time wrote that while he was an unknown in Paris, he should prove to become known very quickly due to his precision and talent. During this time he painted his masterpiece "The Russian Poet", which was hailed by John Singer Sargent as surpassing some of his own works when he saw it in exhibition. Many of Azadigian's works sold in Paris without the buyers being aware the artist was just a young student. While in Paris he was close to his "uncle" the noted Armenian writer Ruben Vorperian, a fellow Armenian from Malatya. Azadigian also spent time working in Rome and Venice as well before returning to America in 1923, perhaps due to his father falling ill. He returned home to discover his father had died less than two months prior.

== Budding success and abrupt death ==
Back in Philadelphia, Manuel experienced a difficult period of grief and readjustment. His family home in the tenements of North Philadelphia was not conducive to his talent, and so he turned his eyes to New York City. There he sought out his distant relative, photoengraver Leo Gananian. They rented an apartment together which allowed Manuel to better concentrate on his art. Soon after, Manuel started noticing a pain in his lower spine, which was diagnosed by a doctor as lumbago. However it continued to worsen, causing loss of appetite and weight. During this same time in 1924 he met a photographer who catered to Broadway and film stars. Through this contact he was introduced to the famous actress Hazel Dawn, who invited him to her Amityville estate to paint her portrait. For three weeks he painted through the pain, until collapsing at his easel one day in late August. Ms. Dawn had him rushed to her brother-in-law, noted New York doctor Emmett Browning, who discovered Manuel was fatally afflicted with cancer. He was given less than a month to live and returned to his mother's home in Philadelphia. Dawn halted her acting work to go there to his bedside to comfort him. He died only a few weeks later, a promising talent cut off just as his career was seeing even greater success.

== Legacy ==
The Unfinished Portrait of Hazel Dawn, 1924, a recreation of Azadigian painting the actress taken after his death to illustrate her article for the Daily Graphic. Manuel's cousin Leo sat-in as the late artist.

In the wake of Azadigian's death, Hazel Dawn sought to tell his story to the world. She contacted the New York Daily Graphic and told his story, which was the featured story of its December 6, 1924 edition. Unfortunately it did not have the desired effect, and Manuel's mother requested his paintings in New York be sent to her in Philadelphia via the Jerrehian Rug Company there. The paintings never made it to her however, they are believed to have arrived in Philadelphia but vanished at some point along the way to his family. To avoid a similar fate for his remaining paintings still in the family's possession, some decades later his sister donated them to his alma mater the Pennsylvania Academy of the Fine Arts, but it has no record of any such paintings.

Manuel was originally buried with his father in Philadelphia's Odd Fellows Cemetery until it was shut down in 1951, at which point they were moved to Lawnview Cemetery in Rockledge, Pennsylvania.

== Rediscovery ==
In the 2010s, a historian took up the cause of spreading awareness about Azadigian's tragic story in hopes that paintings he might have sold during his lifetime still exist in private collections. After nearly a decade, an Azadigian surfaced at an estate sale in New York, which was later sold at auction under the title "Spring in the Valley" for three times above the maximum estimate. News of this auction led to the emergence of two more paintings from a private collection which were said to have been gifted to the owner by Azadigian's family in the 1940s. One of those sold for over five times the maximum estimate. All three paintings are scenes of wooded villages in France painted during his time there in 1922-23.

== Gallery ==
The paintings rediscovered in the 2020s were all painted during Azadigian's time in Paris in 1922-23. Their original titles are not known, and the ones listed here were given by the auction house which sold them.

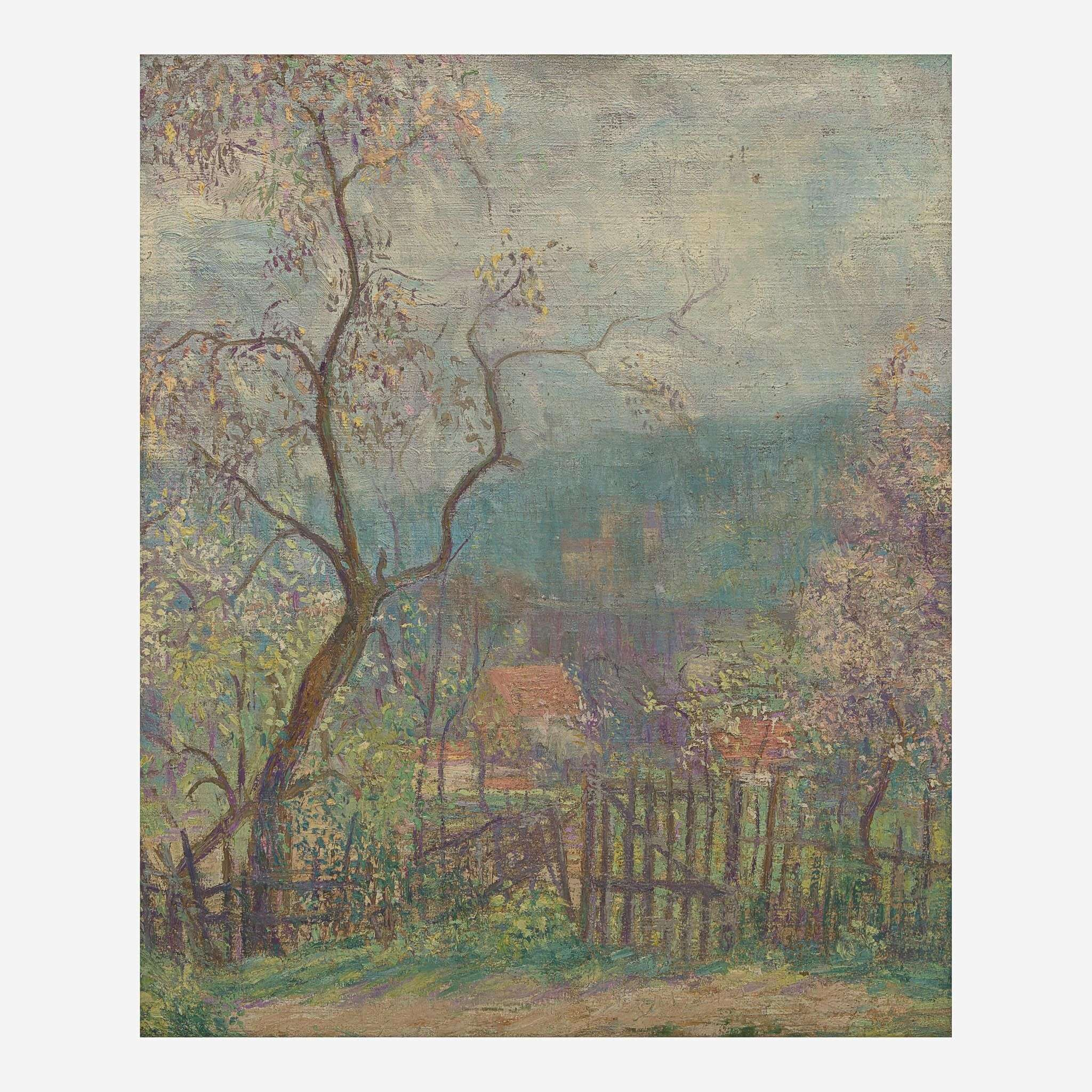
"Spring in the Valley"

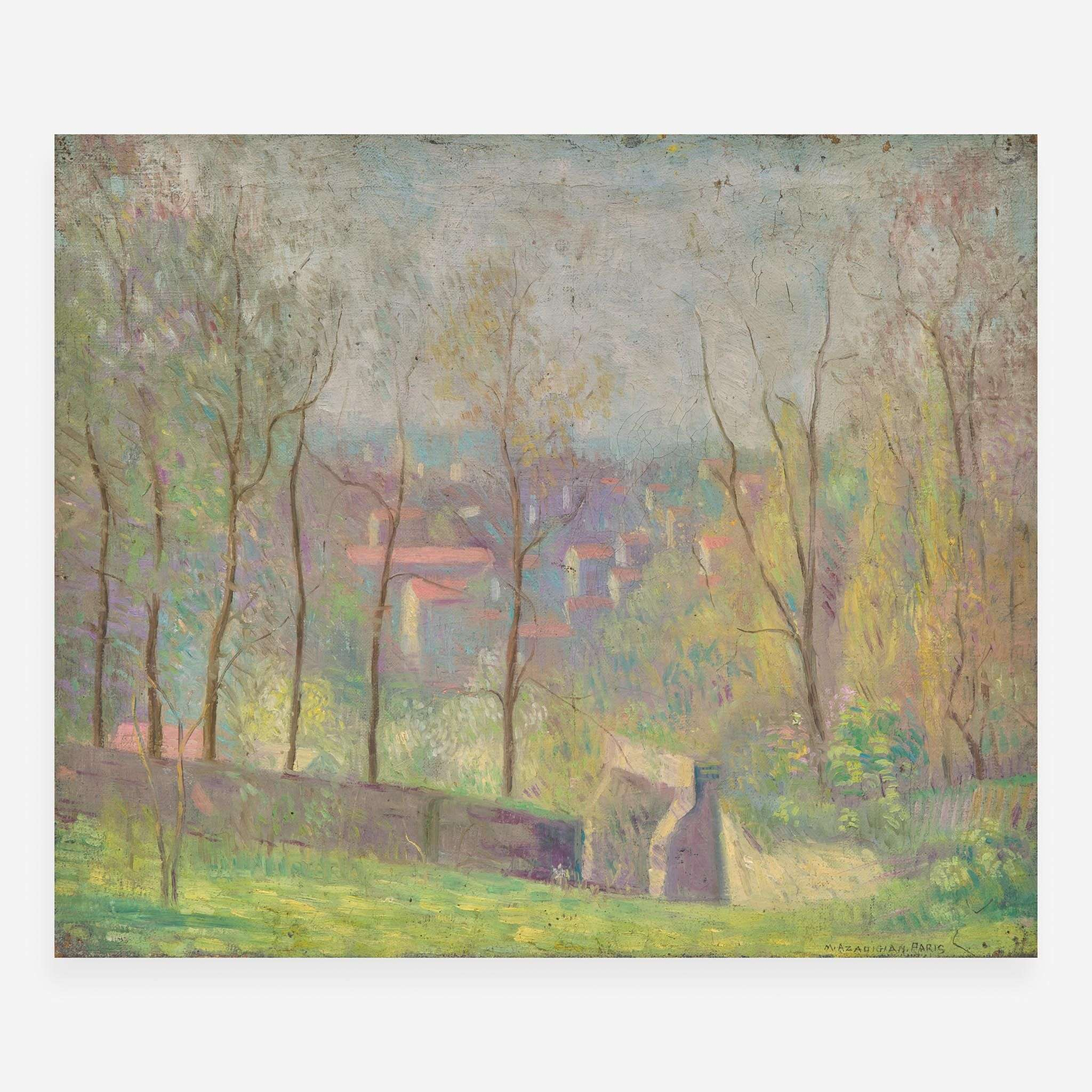
"Hilltop Landscape"

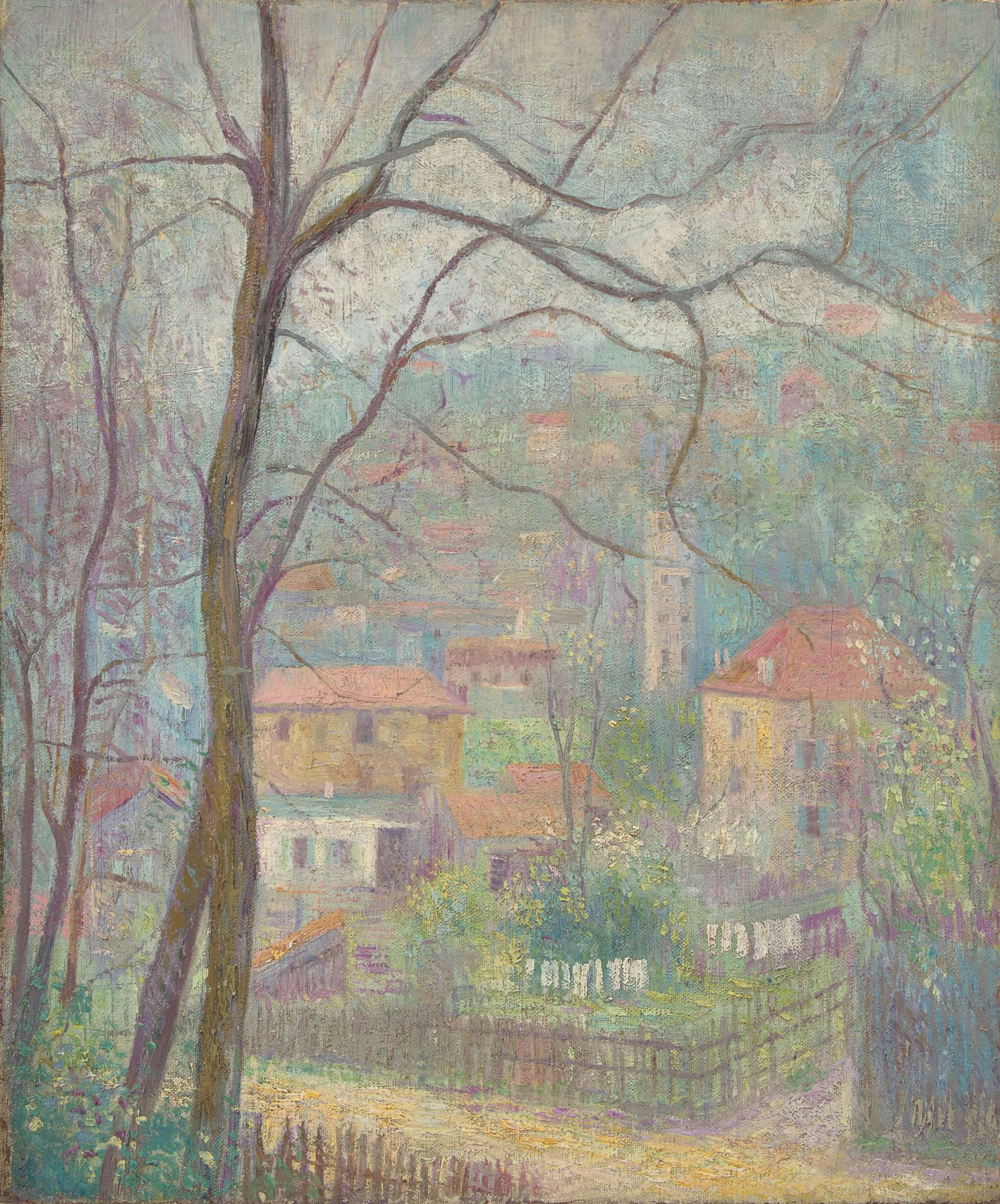
"Hanging Clothes"

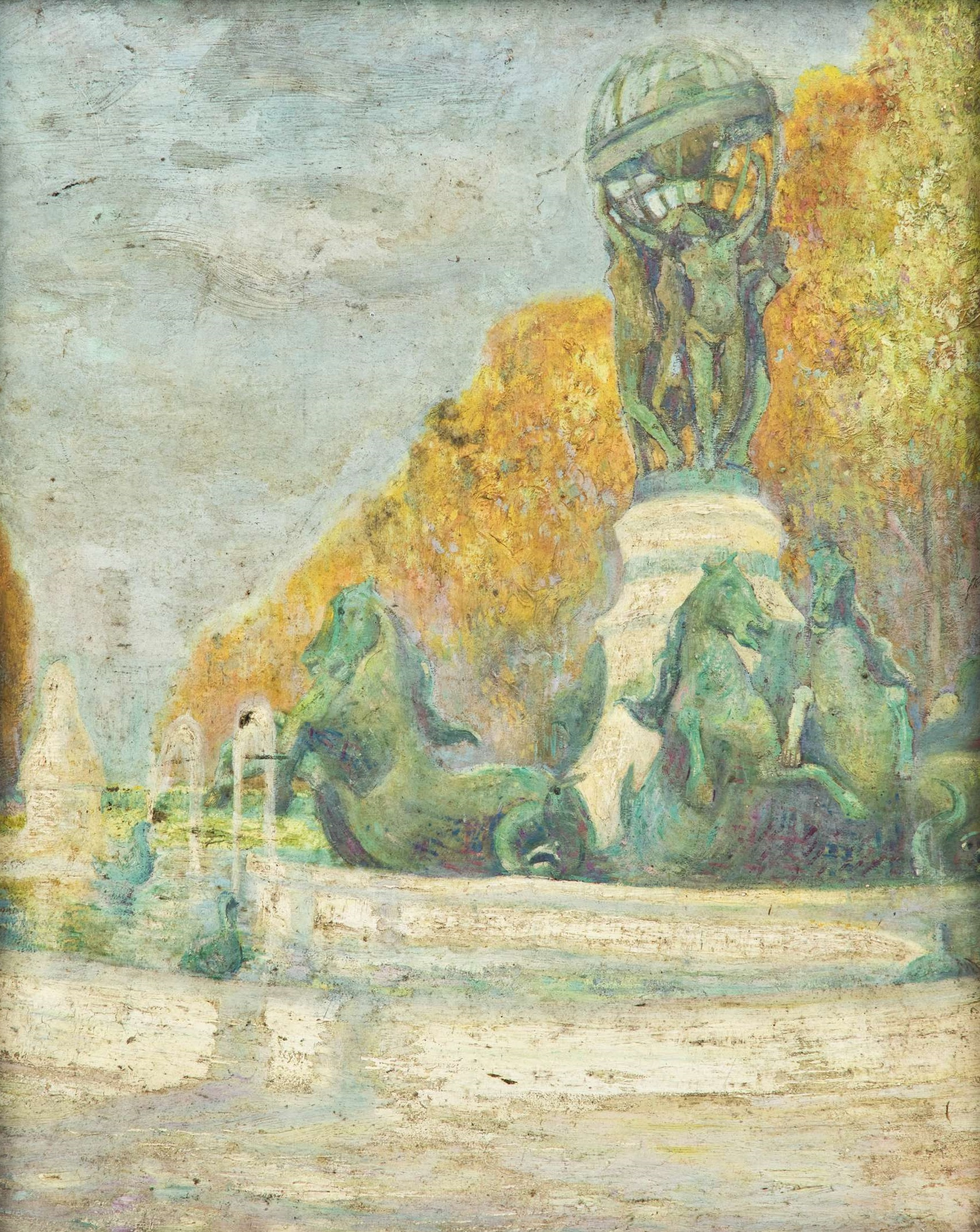
"Fontaine de l'Observatoire, Paris"

== Notes ==
- Dawn, Hazel (December 6, 1924). "I Want to Paint a Beautiful Soul". New York Daily Graphic, Feature Section, p. 8–9.
- Gananian, Leo (Summer 1977). "Forgotten Genius". Ararat Magazine, Armenian General Benevolent Union, p. 21–23.
