= Berge Setrakian =

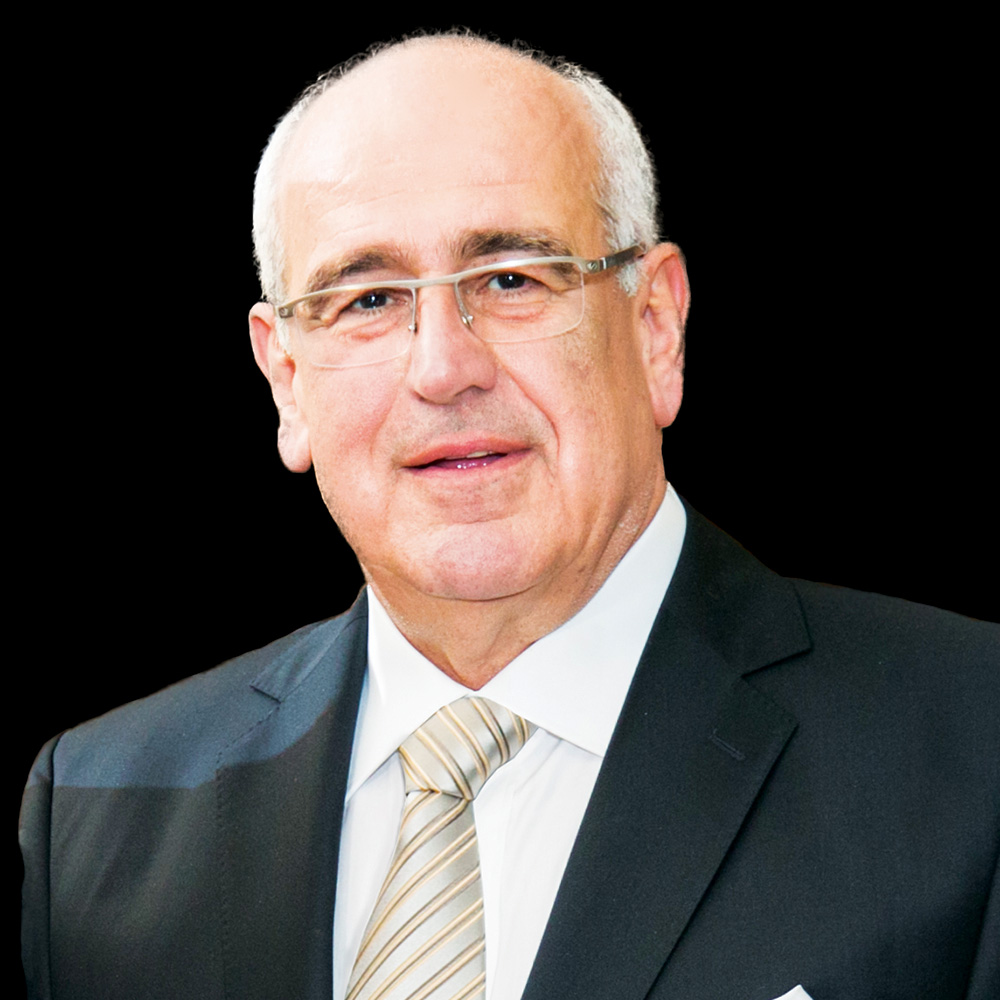

Berge Setrakian (born 14 April 1949 in Beirut, Lebanon), is a lawyer who was the President of the Armenian General Benevolent Union (AGBU) from 2002 to 2024.

== Biography ==
Setrakian has a master's degrees in French and Comparative Laws and after practicing law for some years in Beirut, joined the law firm of Whitman & Ransom in the 1970s and now practices law as a Partner with the firm DLA Piper.

Setrakian has served the AGBU in various leadership positions for many years and was elected member of the Central Board of Directors in 1977, and was from 1992 Vice President and Secretary during the presidency of Louise Manoogian Simone.

He was recognized with an Ellis Island Medal of Honor for his work on behalf of the Armenian-American community.
