= A & M Karagheusian =

American rug manufacturer

A. & M. Karagheusian, Inc.
- Industry: Rug manufacturing
- Defunct: 1964
- Headquarters: 295 Fifth Avenue, Manhattan

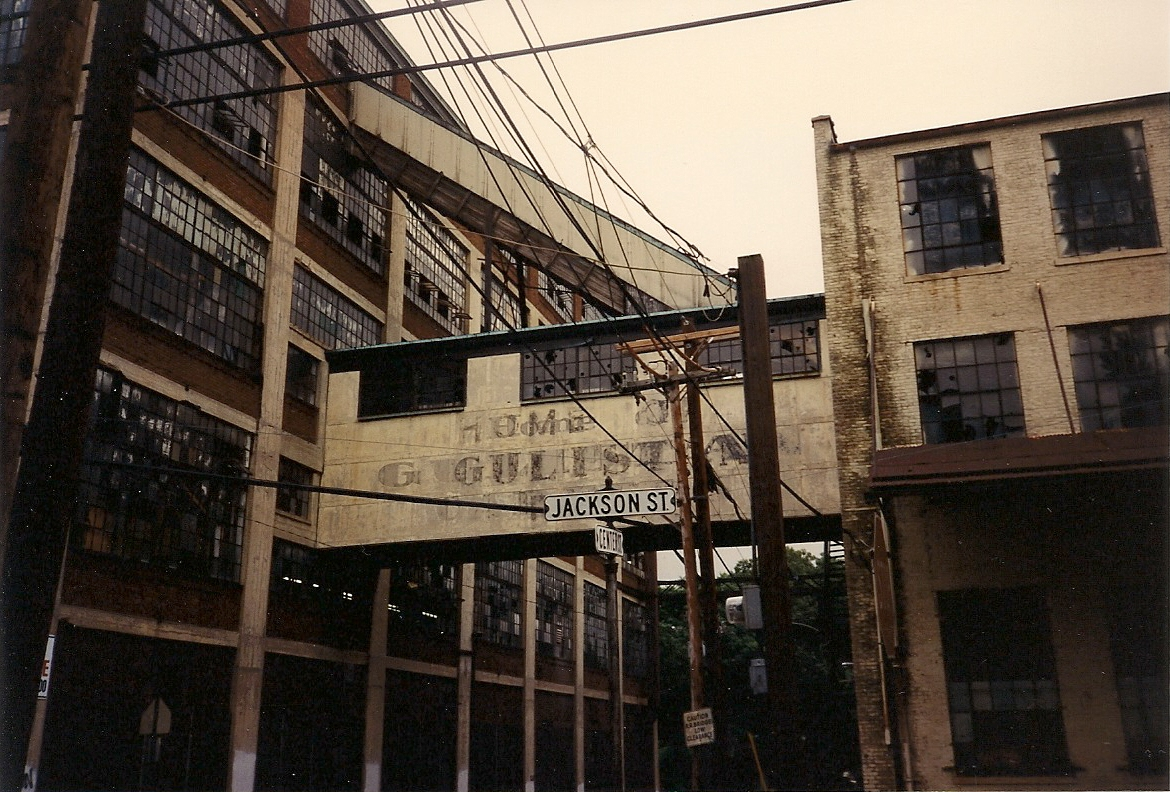
A portion of the Karagheusian Rug Mill as it stood, long abandoned, in Freehold in 1990. The faded "Gulistan" name can be seen in the center.

A. & M. Karagheusian, Inc. was a rug manufacturer headquartered at 295 Fifth Avenue in Manhattan. Manufacturing was located in Freehold Borough, New Jersey and operated for 60 years before closing in 1964. It employed 1,700 people at its peak operation in the 1930s. Bruce Springsteen wrote about the Karagheusian Rug Mill’s closing in his 1984 song "My Hometown".

== History ==
Arshag Karagheusian (1872-1963) and Miran Karagheusian (1874-1948), were Armenians and fled Turkey in 1896 to go to England and then to the United States. The family had been in the rug trade in Turkey since 1818, and they began in the United States in 1897 as rug importers, and then expanded into manufacturing in 1903. By 1927 they had 15 broadlooms, weighing 15 tons each, and 196 single looms. They developed, and were the only manufacturers of "Gulistan Rug" carpets. They made the carpet for Radio City Music Hall in 1932 and for the United States Supreme Court building in 1933. They stopped manufacturing oriental carpets in 1953.

== Miran Karagheusian ==
Miran Karagheusian (1874–1948) had attended Robert College in Constantinople (Istanbul). He married Zabelle and had two children: Howard Karagheusian, who died young and a scholarship was set up in his name, and a daughter, Leila Karagheusian (c. 1910-1999). Miran Karagheusian died on October 7, 1948, at Lenox Hill Hospital in Manhattan, he lived in Oyster Bay, New York.

== Arshag Karagheusian ==
Arshag Karagheusian (1872–1963) had the following children: Jean Karagheusian Hallaure (1898–2000) aka Alice Hallaure; Charles Karagheusian (1903–1977) who married Artemis Tavshanjian (1904–1990) on April 30, 1927, and Marguerite Karagheusian Agathon (husband Oshin Agathon) (1904–1986). Arshag served as the head of the Armenian General Benevolent Union from 1943 to 1952. Arshag died on September 24, 1963, in Larchmont, New York.

== Archive ==
The Monmouth County Historical Association at 70 Court Street in Freehold Borough, New Jersey, houses a collection of manuscripts, newsletters, newspaper clippings, photographs, negatives and other materials related to the A & M Karagheusian Rug Mill, which was located in Freehold, New Jersey.

== Roselle Park factory ==
The company had a factory in Roselle Park, New Jersey, from May 19, 1923 to 1962.

== See also ==
- Armenian Americans
- Textile industry
- Freehold Borough, New Jersey
