= Richard Manoogian =

American businessman

- Born: Alexander Manoogian; 1936; Detroit, Michigan, United States
- Died: 2026/9/25; Detroit, Michigan, United States
- Occupations: Businessman, entrepreneur, industrial engineer
- Spouse: Jane

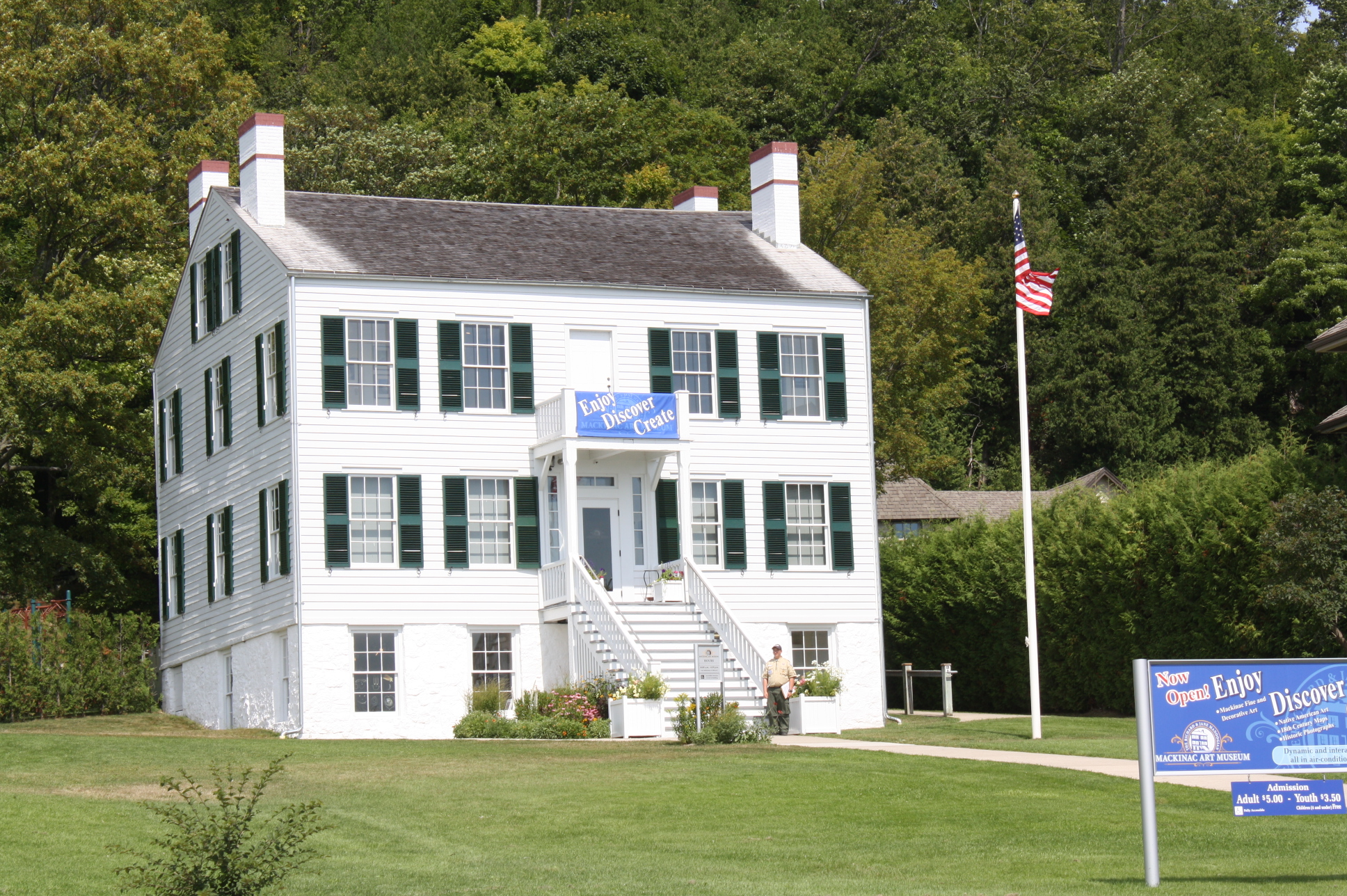
Richard and Jane Manoogian Mackinac Art Museum.

Richard Manoogian (Armenian: Ռիչարտ Մանուկեան; (1936 - September 25, 2026, died at the age of 90) was an Armenian-American businessman, and philanthropist who spent his career in Detroit, Michigan. In 1964 he was elected to the board of Masco Corporation, which was founded by his father, and in 1968 become president and CEO.

Manoogian graduated from Yale. He was listed on the Forbes list of the richest people in the world a number of times, and was a billionaire.

== Personal life and death ==
Manoogian was the son of Alex Manoogian and Marie Manoogian (born Tatian), both Armenian immigrants from the Ottoman Empire.

Richard married Jane and they had three children.

== Philanthropy and civic organizations ==
Manoogian became chairman of the large foundation named after his parents, as well as started his own and contributed to many charities, including Armenian and American causes.

Richard and Jane donated substantial amounts to the art museum on Mackinac Island, which was then named the Richard and Jane Manoogian Mackinac Art Museum. The Schaap Center has a Richard and Jane Manoogian Art Gallery.
