= Hayk Party =

Hayk Party Հայկ կուսակցություն
- Leader: Artyom Khachikyan
- Headquarters: Yerevan, Armenia
- Ideology: Liberalism
- Political position: Centre
- National affiliation: Pan-Armenian National Agreement

The Hayk Party, sometimes called the Haykazunner Party (Armenian: Հայկ կուսակցություն) is an Armenian political party. The party is led by Artyom Khachikyan.

== History ==
Some party members participated in the 2018 Armenian parliamentary election under the Christian-Democratic Rebirth Party's electoral list. However, the Christian-Democratic Rebirth Party received just 0.51% of the popular vote and failed to gain any political representation.

The Hayk party did participate in the 2018 Yerevan City Council elections, winning just 0.19% of the popular vote. As such, the party failed to gain any seats in the Yerevan City Council.

The party does not have any representation in the National Assembly and currently acts as an extra-parliamentary force.

== Ideology ==
The party has described itself as moderately liberal, pro-state, and values the social welfare of Armenia's citizens.

== Activities ==
On 15 June 2020, the Hayk Party signed a joint declaration along with the Christian People's Revival Party and the Nzhdehian Tseghakron Party calling for an end to foreign interference in Armenia's political affairs, tackling Armenia's foreign debt, and protecting the independence of state institutions and democracy.

On 30 December 2020, the party signed a joint declaration with six other political parties following the defeat of Armenia in the 2020 Nagorno-Karabakh war. The declaration opposes Russian and Turkish division of Armenian territories, supports the independence of Artsakh, and calls on the Government of Armenia to establish a new security pact with the United States and the European Union.

On 15 April 2021, the party signed a joint declaration with eight other political parties calling on the President of Armenia, Armen Sarksyan, to ensure democracy and the Constitution of Armenia is upheld in the country during the 2020–2021 Armenian protests.

== See also ==
- Programs of political parties in Armenia
