= Arshag Karagheusian =

Armenian rug manufacturer

Arshag Karagheusian (Armenian: Արշակ Կարագյոզյան December 4, 1872 - September 24, 1963) was an Armenian rug manufacturer and co-owner of A. & M. Karagheusian, Inc. He also served as the head of the Armenian General Benevolent Union becoming its 4th president from 1943 to 1952, after Boghos Nubar, Calouste Gulbenkian and Zareh Nubar.

== Career ==
Arshag Karagheusian and his brother Miran Karagheusian (1874–1948) fled the Ottoman Empire in 1896 to go to England and then to the United States. Their family had been in the rug trade in Turkey since 1818, and they began in the United States in 1897 as rug importers.

They expanded into manufacturing in 1903. By 1927 they had 15 broadlooms and 196 single looms. They were the only manufacturers of "Gulistan Rug" carpets, a style which they developed. They were commissioned to make the carpet for Radio City Music Hall in 1932 and for the United States Supreme Court building in 1933.

The company A. & M. Karagheusian, Inc. was headquartered at 295 Fifth Avenue in Manhattan. The manufacturing plant was located in Freehold Borough, New Jersey, where it operated for 60 years before closing in 1964. At its peak operation in the 1930s, it employed 1,700 people. They stopped manufacturing oriental-style carpets in 1953.

Arshag Karagheusian and his wife had the following children:

- Jean Karagheusian (1898–2000), who married Mr. Jean Hallaure; she was aka Alice Hallaure;
- Charles Karagheusian (1903–1977), who married Artemis Tavshanjian (1904–1990) on April 30, 1927;
- Marguerite Karagheusian (1904–1986), who married Mr. Oshin Agathon.

Arshag Karagheusian died on September 24, 1963, in Larchmont, New York.
