= Unity Party (Armenia) =

Unity Party Միասնություն կուսակցություն
- Leader: Vartan Oskanian
- Founded: April 27, 2016
- Headquarters: Yerevan, Armenia
- Ideology: National liberalism Pro-Europeanism; Pro-Western
- Political position: Centre
- National affiliation: ORO Alliance (2016-2017)
- Slogan: "Heritage, unity, victory"

The Unity Party (Armenian: Միասնություն կուսակցություն), also known as the Consolidation Party, is an Armenian political party.

== History ==
The party was founded in April 2016 and Vartan Oskanian, who served as the former Minister of Foreign Affairs of Armenia, was nominated to represent the party as leader. The party participated in the 2017 Armenian parliamentary election as part of a political alliance with the Heritage Party. The alliance, known as the 'Ohanyan-Raffi-Oskanyan' or 'ORO Alliance', won just 2.07% of the vote and failed to gain any seats within the National Assembly.

The party did not participate in the 2018, nor 2021 Armenian parliamentary elections. Currently, the party acts as an extra-parliamentary force.

== Ideology ==
The party believes in establishing a strong liberal market economy and democratic society, modeled after the success of the Baltic States development following the collapse of the Soviet Union. The party supports the European integration of Armenia. Party leader Vartan Oskanian stated, "The Armenian people, being in the realm of Christian and Western values, as a member of the pan-European family, can take its place and role in the civilized world."

The party also supports the independence and right to self-determination of the Republic of Artsakh, as well as, developing closer and balanced political and economic relations with Russia, the United States, Iran, Georgia, and with the European Union. Oskanian stated that the party would be ready to cooperate with various political forces, strengthen relations with the outside world and with the Armenian Diaspora, and also tackle poverty and increase the population of Armenia, while pursuing peace in the South Caucasus region.

== See also ==
- Programs of political parties in Armenia
