= Pan-Armenian National Agreement =

Pan-Armenian National Agreement Համահայկական ազգային համաձայնագիր
- Leader: Arthur Babayan
- Founded: 2019
- Headquarters: Yerevan, Armenia
- Ideology: Armenian nationalism Social conservatism
- Political position: Centre
- Alliance of: Hayk Party; Christian People's Revival Party; Nzhdehian Tseghakron Party; Social Justice Party

Website
- https://www.aanc.am/

The Pan-Armenian National Agreement, sometimes called the All-Armenian National Consensus (Armenian: Համահայկական ազգային համաձայնագիր) is an Armenian political alliance.

== History ==
The alliance was founded on 22 June 2019 and consists of the Hayk Party, the Christian People's Revival Party, the Nzhdehian Tseghakron Party, and the Social Justice Party. The alliance does not have any representation within the National Assembly and currently acts as an extra-parliamentary force.

During the 2020−2021 Armenian protests, the alliance called for the resignation of Prime Minister Nikol Pashinyan and for free elections to follow. The alliance is against holding the 2021 Armenian constitutional referendum and opposes any of the former leaders of Armenia, including Robert Kocharyan and Serzh Sargsyan, of returning to power.

== Ideology ==
The alliance believes in direct democracy, abolishing the Presidency, strengthening the sovereignty of Armenia, continuing the economic development of the country, establishing independent media, making university education free of charge, encouraging repatriation of the Armenian Diaspora, protecting rights of ethnic minorities, supports the concept of Wilsonian Armenia and the unification of Artsakh with Armenia. The alliance also opposes same-sex marriage and the operation of foreign military bases in the country.

== Leadership ==
Leadership of the alliance consists of a Political Council, led by Arthur Babayan, and includes:

- Artyom Khachikyan, Chairman of the Hayk Party
- George Hovsepyan, President of the Nzhdehian Tseghakron Party
- Mkrtich Gimishyan, President of the Christian People's Revival Party

== See also ==
- Programs of political parties in Armenia
