= Social Justice Party (Armenia) =

Social Justice Party Սոցիալական արդարություն կուսակցություն
- Leader: Arthur Baloyan
- Founded: 1999
- Headquarters: Yerevan, Armenia
- Ideology: Liberalism; Progressivism
- Political position: Centre to centre-left
- National affiliation: ORO Alliance (2017); Pan-Armenian National Agreement (supportive); National Democratic Pole (supportive)
- National Assembly: 0 / 107

Website
- party.ardarutyun.am/

The Social Justice Party (Armenian: Սոցիալական արդարություն կուսակցություն, romanized: Sots’ialakan ardarut’yan kusakts’ut’yun) is an Armenian political party. It was founded in 1999 and is currently led by Arthur Baloyan.

== History ==
The party participated in the 2003 Armenian parliamentary election, but failed to win any seats in the National Assembly, gaining just 0.54% of the popular vote.

The party's leader, Arthur Baloyan, participated in the 2017 Armenian parliamentary election as part of the ORO Alliance, but failed to win a seat in the National Assembly.

The party boycotted the 2018 Armenian parliamentary election, due to concerns that the election was not fair. However, the party stated that it would support non-partisan candidates and work closely with other political parties as an extra-parliamentary force.

In June 2019, Arthur Baloyan signed a joint agreement with the other members of the Pan-Armenian National Agreement calling for the protection of the Constitution of Armenia.

Following the 2021 Armenian political crisis and the 2020–2021 Armenian protests, the party condemned the Armenian military's interference in the countries political affairs. The party also signed a declaration of cooperation with the National Democratic Pole, an alliance of opposition political figures in Armenia. The declaration called on the Prime Minister of Armenia Nikol Pashinyan to resign, for the territorial integrity of Armenia and Artsakh to be upheld, and to prepare for free and fair elections.

== Ideology ==
The party supports a strong democratic Armenia and advocates for respecting the rule of law, free speech, equality, fighting against discrimination, respecting human rights, and ensuring the environmental protection of the country. The party's manifesto states, "The state must ensure that all citizens live by the rule of law, without discrimination on the basis of race, religion, ethnicity, gender, sexual orientation or any other grounds." The party also supports equal pay work and gender equality, increasing minimum wage, and improving health care.

In regards to foreign policy, the party advocates for peace and cooperation in the Caucasus region.

== Activities ==
In 2014, the Justice Party held a joint rally with the Rule of Law party in Yerevan. Both party's were protesting against the rise of electricity prices in Armenia.

In December 2020, Arthur Baloyan met with the President of Armenia, Armen Sarksyan to discuss the political situation in the country.

On 15 April 2021, the party signed a joint declaration with eight other political parties calling on the President of Armenia to ensure democracy and the Constitution of Armenia is upheld in the country during the 2020–2021 Armenian protests.

== See also ==
- Programs of political parties in Armenia
