= Third Republic Party =

Third Republic Party Երրորդ Հանրապետություն կուսակցություն
- Leader: Viktor Dallakyan
- Founded: 2016
- Headquarters: Yerevan
- National Assembly: 0 / 107

The Third Republic Party (Armenian: Երրորդ Հանրապետություն կուսակցություն, romanized: Yerrord Hanrapetut’yun kusakts’ut’yun) is an Armenian political party. It was founded in 2016 and is currently led by Viktor Dallakyan.

== History ==
The Third Republic Party was founded on 28 November 2016. In 2016, Edward Antinyan stepped down as chairman of the party and was replaced by Viktor Dallakyan, former member of the Republican Party of Armenia and former deputy chief of staff of the President of Armenia.

Prior to the 2017 Armenian parliamentary election, the party announced its intentions to participate in the elections with the ORO Alliance. However, three months before the election, the party stated that it would no longer be participating in the elections and would not join the ORO Alliance.

The party does not currently maintain any representation in the National Assembly.

== Ideology ==
The party supports promoting the economic development of the country, overcoming poverty, investing in agriculture, and alleviating unemployment. The party believes in transforming Armenia into a modern, competitive state and supports the international recognition of the Republic of Artsakh.

== See also ==
- Programs of political parties in Armenia
