= Civilitas Foundation =

Armenian non-profit organization

Coordinates: 40.183701°N 44.515191°E

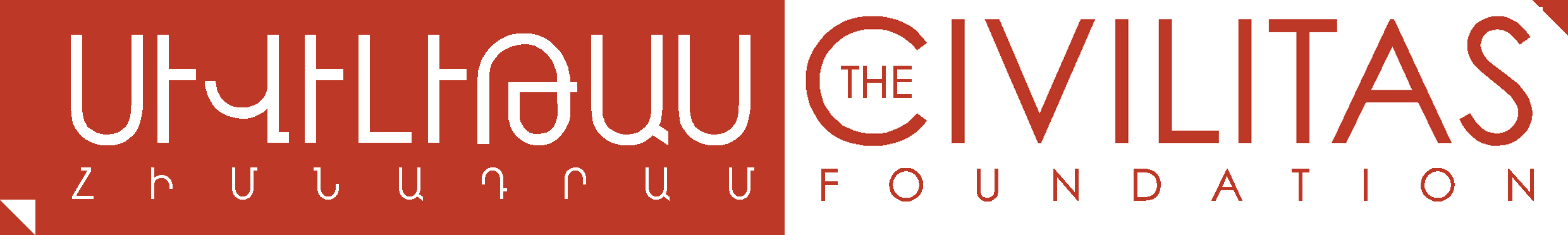
- Founder: Vartan Oskanian
- Founded at: Armenia
- Type: Nonprofit
- Legal status: Foundation
- Headquarters: One Northern Avenue, Suite 30, Yerevan, Armenia
- Location: Armenia
- Official language: Armenian, English
- Website: civilitasfoundation.org

The Civilitas Foundation (Armenian: Սիվիլիթաս հիմնադրամ) is an Armenian non-profit organization based in Yerevan. It is a development agency and think tank currently directed by Apo Boghigian that works to strengthen civil society, promote democracy, economic development and education in Armenia, and facilitate dialogue between Armenia and the international community on a number of pertinent political issues. In doing so, Civilitas has strengthened the ties between Armenia and the Armenian Diaspora. The organization houses CivilNet, an independent media outlet.

== History ==
The organization was founded in October 2008 by Vartan Oskanian, who formally had served as Armenia's Minister of Foreign Affairs. The name was derived from the Latin word Civilitas.

== CivilNet Media ==
CivilNet -- an independent and online multilingual media outlet of the Civilitas Foundation -- was launched by Oskanian on September 21, 2011. CivilNet is certified as compliant with the journalistic standards of the International Fact-Checking Network and the European Fact-Checking Standards Network.

Through CivilNet, the foundation produces content in Armenian and English like interviews, articles and weekly wrap-up videos, which focus on fundamental human rights, Armenian democracy, regional peace and the Diaspora, as well as political, economic, social and cultural events in Turkey that are directly or indirectly related to Armenia-Turkey relations, also providing contextual background to the topics.

CivilNet produced three films about the 1918 Treaty of Batum, the 1920 Treaty of Alexandropol, and the 1921 Treaty of Moscow and Treaty of Kars respectively. CivilNet also produced the 2017 documentary film Survival Songs: From West to East, an ethnographic collage showcasing stories and folk music of various Armenian communities formed after the emigrations from Western to Eastern Armenia. Its screening on November 13 at the Armenian Embassy in Russia was organized by the initiative of Barev Cultural Club in Moscow.

== The Council on International Relations ==
The Civilitas Council on International Relations advocates peace and stability in the Caucasus through multifaceted dialogue and open discourse. It hosts monthly discussion forums which inform Armenia's opinion and policymaking process and the international academic, political and media communities about Armenia's foreign and domestic policy choices, options and actions in the context of Armenia's national security challenges. Through public and private discussions, research and publications, the Council promotes the Armenian perspective internationally and domestically.

Since its establishment, the Council has published annual reports on the state of Armenia up to 2013, providing an in-depth analysis of Armenia's current political standing. Their first ever report, Armenia in 2008: Crisis and Opportunity, was published in 2008.

The Council on International Relations organized the Neighbors About Each Other project with support from USAID, Eurasia Partnership Foundation and the Hrant Dink Foundation. The project offered translations of articles from both the Turkish and Armenian press. Turkish articles about Armenia and Armenians were translated into the Armenian language and made available to Armenian publications, while Armenian articles about Turkey and the Turkish people were translated into the Turkish language and made available to Turkish publications. All articles were also translated into English for the benefit of the international community. The various translations were archived on the project's now-defunct website.

== Democracy and Development ==
The Democracy and Development Initiative of the Civilitas Foundation supports and promotes democratization in Armenia. Currently, the initiative is focusing on rural development and education projects.

=== Rural Economic Facilitation Program ===
The Civilitas Foundation initiates, executes and backs projects which facilitate, support sustainable, comprehensive and even development in Armenia's villages, enabling villagers to live a self-reliant, dignified life in Armenia's border areas. From small social and economic undertakings to larger infrastructure projects, the Foundation works with donors and implementers to assure an inclusive, comprehensive approach.

The Rural Economic Facilitation Program's main initiative is the Dairy Production Assistance Program, which sells cows and milking machines to Armenian farmers on a microfinance loan basis, with 0% interest rate. The farmers pay back in full the price of the cow or milking machine within ten months, and that money is used to buy a new one for another farmer, thereby increasing the number of beneficiaries.

=== Libraries as Centers of Civil Society ===
The Libraries as Centers of Civil Society project supports and strengthens public libraries in a number of rural and urban communities throughout Armenia, in order to transform them into true centers of community life providing a number of services to the population. With funds from the US Embassy, the Civilitas Foundation is currently rebuilding 10 libraries in the Armenian provinces and stocking them with new books in both Armenian and English.

== Civilitas Generation Center ==
The Civilitas Generation Center was designed to support new approaches and solutions to Armenia's geographic, economic and experiential limitations. In keeping with its mission, the Generation Center has developed a database of existing NGOs in Armenia in the now-defunct website Civil.am, which was updated with the aid of participating NGOs. The database served to introduce projects to people, help NGOs identify alternative sources of support, and link new initiatives with existing experience.

== See also ==
- Economy of Armenia
- Education in Armenia
