= ORO Alliance =

ORO Alliance ՕՐՕ դաշինք
- Leader: Seyran Ohanyan; Raffi Hovannisian; Vartan Oskanian
- Founded: February 13, 2016
- Headquarters: Yerevan, Armenia
- Ideology: National liberalism
- Political position: Centre
- Slogan: "Heritage, unity, victory"

The ORO Alliance (Armenian: ՕՐՕ դաշինք), also known as the Ohanyan-Raffi-Oskanian Alliance, was an Armenian political alliance formed by the merger of the Unity and Heritage Parties and the former Minister of Defence Seyran Ohanyan to run in the 2017 Armenian parliamentary election.

== History ==
The alliance was established on 13 February 2016. The name of the party reflects the three politicians who signed the memorandum founding the alliance. The surnames of Seyran Ohanyan (former Defence minister of Armenia), Raffi Hovannisian (Heritage Party Leader), and Vartan Oskanian (Unity Party Leader), were used as an acronym to name the alliance.

Prior to the election, the alliance stated that they would be open to working with all other political parties within Armenia for the betterment of the country. However, the alliance is very critical of the Republican Party of Armenia and stated that they would refuse to work with them. Meanwhile, the Sasna Tsrer Pan-Armenian Party, the Social Justice Party, and the People's Party announced their support to the ORO Alliance. The Third Republic Party announced its intention to join the ORO Alliance, however, the party ultimately decided not to cooperate with the alliance.

== Electoral record ==
The alliance participated in the 2017 Armenian parliamentary election. Following the election, the alliance received just 2.07% of the popular vote, failing to win any seats within the National Assembly. Following the election, the alliance claimed that the results were rigged. The alliance has not participated in any subsequent elections, however, the alliance confirmed that all three of the leaders would continue to work together as an extra-parliamentary force. The alliance ceased most of its political activities following the 2017 elections.

== Ideology ==
Prior to the election, the ORO Alliance held a rally in central Yerevan calling for radical reforms in Armenia, including fighting corruption and tackling the economic mismanagement of the country. The alliance favors establishing a competitive liberal market economy in Armenia, as well as, improving human rights for all citizens. The alliance also supports the independence of the Republic of Artsakh and a peaceful settlement to the Nagorno-Karabakh conflict.

In regards to foreign policy, Heritage and the Union party are both considerably Pro-Western and Pro-European, and support balanced relations with both the United States and Russia.

== See also ==
- Programs of political parties in Armenia
