= Louise Manoogian Simone =

Armenian American philanthropist (1933–2019)

Louise Manoogian Simone (May 19, 1933 – February 18, 2019) was an Armenian American philanthropist. She was president of the Armenian General Benevolent Union (AGBU) from 1989 to 2002.

== Life ==
Louise Manoogian was born in Detroit, Michigan. Her father Alex Manoogian, an immigrant from Smyrna, founded Masco in 1929 and became wealthy after developing the one-handed faucet in the 1950s. Alex Manoogian was fifth president of the AGBU and a philanthropist for Detroit civic causes and Armenian political and cultural causes.

She was on the AGBU's central council for eight years before succeeding her father as its president. She organized AGBU disaster relief after the 1988 Armenian earthquake. In 1962, her parents established the Louise Manoogian Simone Foundation, which was later renamed the Manoogian Simone Foundation. In 2007 it donated $1.2m to the University of Michigan's Armenian Studies program. In 1979 Simone served a term on the Council of the Eastern U.S. Prelacy of the Armenian Apostolic Church, the first woman in such a senior position. Simone and her brother Richard Manoogian contributed $2m in 2000 towards the construction of Saint Gregory the Illuminator Cathedral, Yerevan.

== Personal life ==
Louise Manoogian married Arman Simone and lived in Manhattan. Simone had a daughter, Christine, and two sons, David and Marc.
