= Alex Manoogian =

American businessman

National Hero of Armenia Alex Manoogian
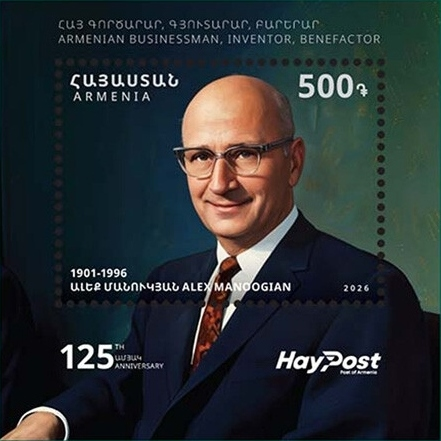
- Manoogian on a 2026 stamp of Armenia
- Born: Alexander Manoogian; June 28, 1901; Kasaba, Ottoman Empire (Turgutlu, Turkey)
- Died: July 10, 1996 (aged 95); Detroit, Michigan, United States
- Occupations: Businessman, entrepreneur, industrial engineer
- Spouse: Marie Tatian
- Children: Louise Manoogian Simone; Richard Manoogian

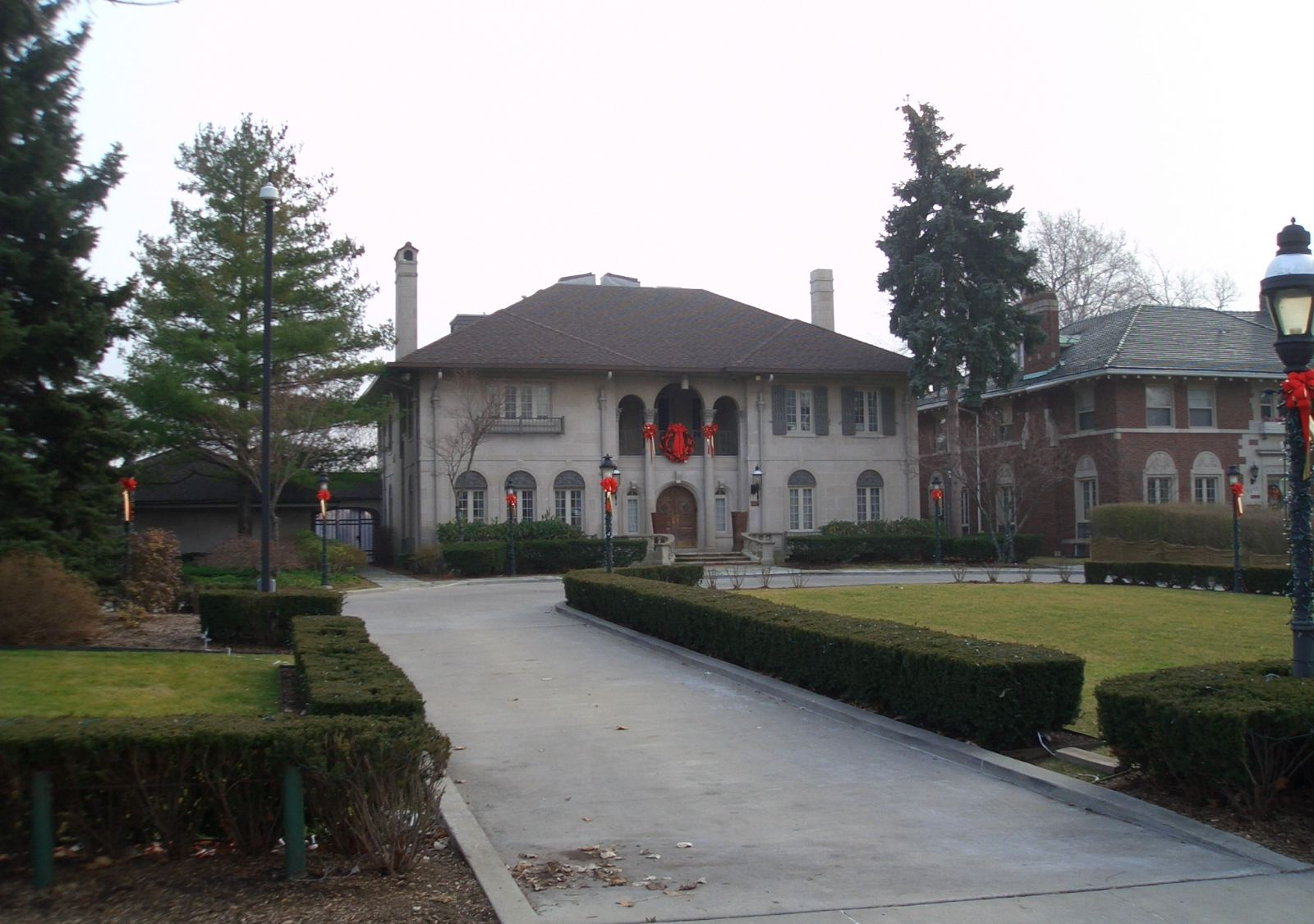
The Manoogian Mansion, Detroit, Michigan.

Alexander Manoogian (Armenian: Ալեք Մանուկեան; June 28, 1901 – July 10, 1996) was an Armenian-American industrial engineer, businessman, and philanthropist who spent most of his career in Detroit, Michigan. He was the founder of the Masco Corporation, which in 1969 was listed on the NYSE (XNYS:MAS). In 1954, he patented and brought to market the first successful washerless ball valve faucet, the Delta faucet, named for the faucet cam shaped like the fourth letter of the Greek alphabet.

He and his wife Marie donated the Manoogian Mansion to the city of Detroit, which uses it as the official residence of the Mayor of Detroit. In addition to donations to local universities, the Manoogians donated substantial amounts of money to churches, educational institutions and charities of the Armenian Diaspora to preserve and continue their culture.

== Early life and career ==
Manoogian was born in 1901 to Tagvor (Armenian: Թագւոր Մանուկեան) and Taguhi Manoogian (Armenian: Թագուհի Մանուկեան) in Kasaba, Ottoman Empire (later Turgutlu, Turkey), near Smyrna. His father was a grain wholesaler. He attended Armenian schools in Smyrna. In 1915, during the Armenian Genocide, Manoogian and his family escaped what is now Turkey through Greece. He later settled in Canada. In 1920, Manoogian immigrated to the United States after escaping the aftermath of the Armenian Genocide, arriving at Ellis Island and settling in Bridgeport, Connecticut. Manoogian began working as a machinist. He also worked for short periods in Rhode Island and Massachusetts.

Manoogian and his family moved to Detroit, Michigan, in 1924, attracted to opportunities in the booming auto industry. After gaining more experience, in 1929 he founded the Masco Screw Company, later known as Masco Corporation. By 1936, in the midst of the Great Depression, Manoogian had expanded Masco to the point that it was listed on the New York Stock Exchange (NYSE). Manoogian's redesign and production of the Delta faucet, which allowed one-handed use, resulted in best-selling status for the plumbing fixture and generated substantial profits for his business. In 1995, his company had $3 billion in sales and had 38 percent of the domestic market for faucets.

== Personal life and death ==
Manoogian married Marie Tatian (1902–1993), also an Armenian immigrant. Their daughter Louise Manoogian Simone (1933–2019) succeeded him as President of AGBU (see below). Their son Richard A. Manoogian (b. 1936) was CEO of the family business Masco.

Marie Manoogian died in 1993, and Alex in 1996. They were first interred in Detroit, Michigan. In 2007 they were reinterred with state honors in Armenia (see below).

== Philanthropy and civic organizations ==
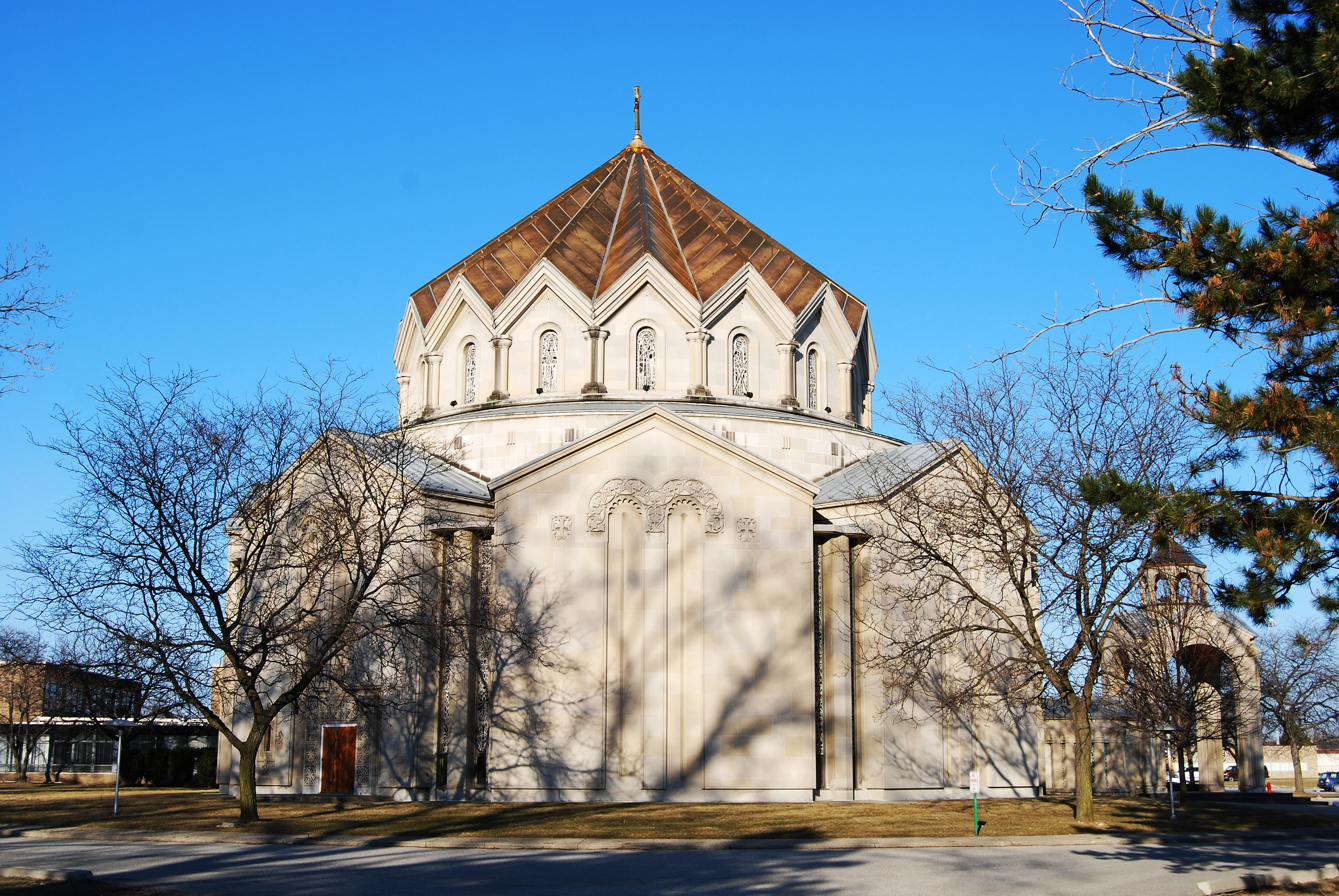
St. John Armenian Church in the Metro Detroit suburb of Southfield, Michigan, substantially funded by Manoogian in the 1960s.

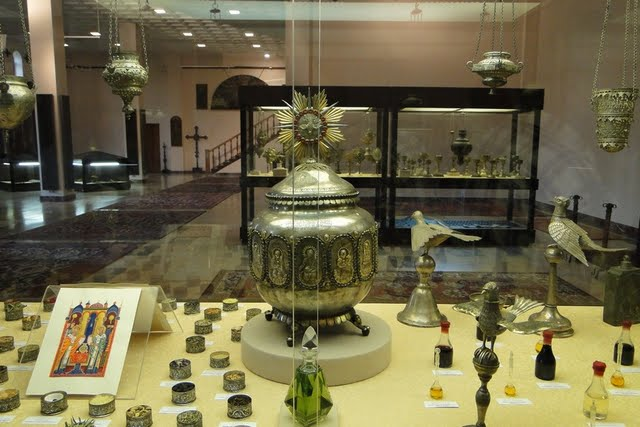
Interior view of Alex and Marie Manoogian Treasury Museum

Manoogian contributed generously to charitable organizations and educational institutions, especially to the Armenian General Benevolent Union (AGBU). In recognition, he was voted Life President in 1970 and Honorary Life President in 1989. Manoogian was also active in the Knights of Vartan; in 1940 he was elected its Avak Sparapet (National Commander).

In 1968 he established the AGBU Alex and Marie Manoogian Cultural Fund. The fund, seeded with a $1 million endowment, is devoted to the publication and translation of Armenian scholarly and literary works, and Armenian cultural material worldwide.

Through the AGBU, the Manoogians funded schools for ethnic Armenians in Southfield, Michigan; Los Angeles, California; Buenos Aires, Argentina; Sydney, Australia; Beirut, Lebanon; Zahle, Lebanon; Egypt; Tehran, Iran; Montreal, Quebec; Toronto, Ontario; and Montevideo, Uruguay (all are named for the Manoogian family). Manoogian also funded numerous Armenian churches, cultural centers, university chairs for Armenian studies and museums worldwide. He donated generously to Wayne State University in Detroit.

== Legacy and honors ==
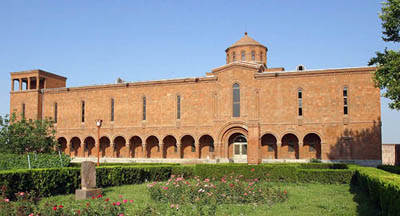
Alex and Marie Manoogian Treasury Museum (1982), designed by the architect Baghdasar Arzoumanian in the grounds of the Mother See of Holy Etchmiadzin.

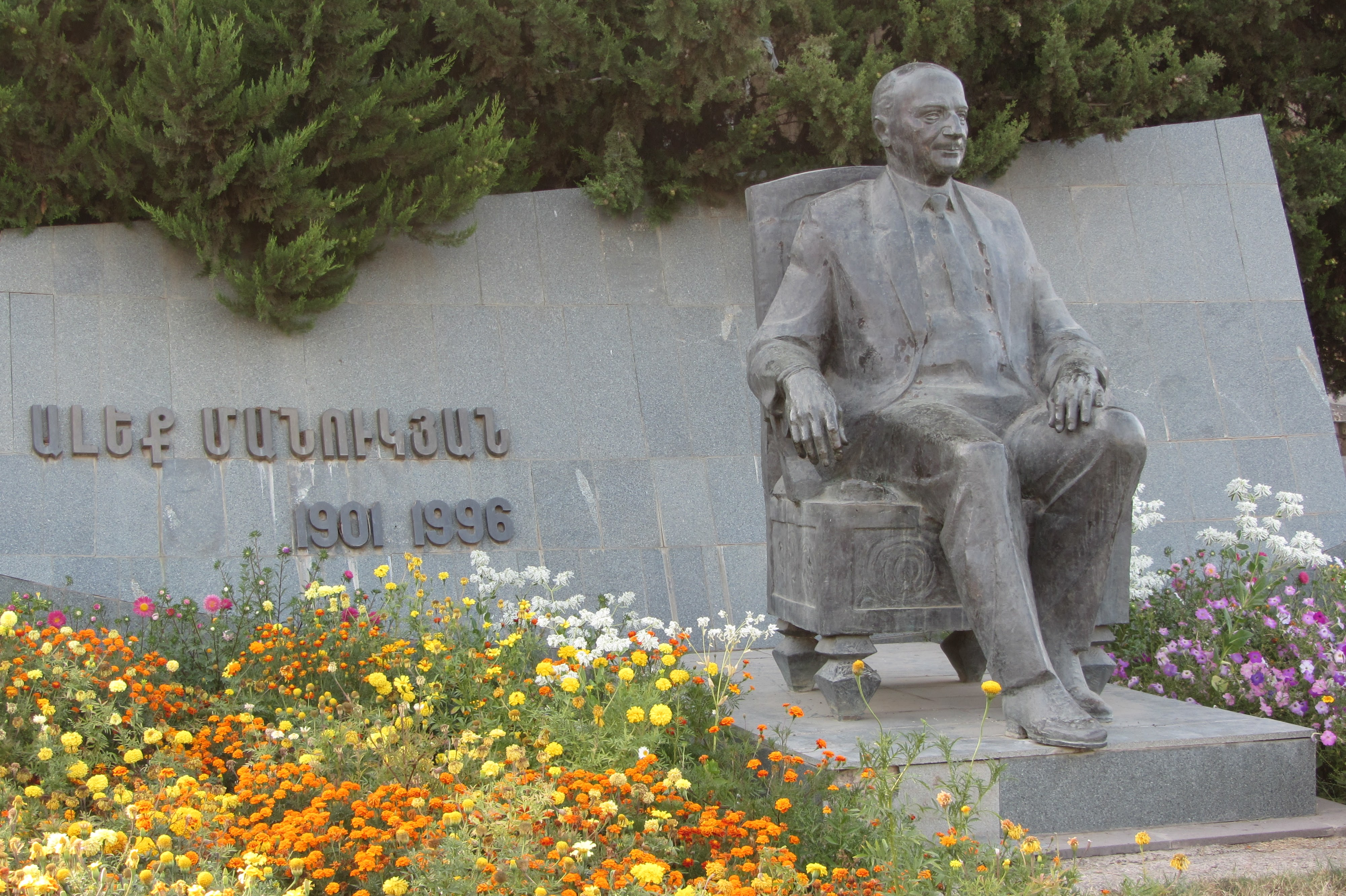
Statue of Manoogian, destroyed by Azerbaijan after it conquered Stepanakert

- Manoogian Hall, Wayne State's center for international language and linguistics, is named after him.
- In 1966 the Manoogians donated their mansion to the city of Detroit. It is used as the mayoral residence.
- In 1982 Alex and Marie Manoogian donated funds for the construction of a museum in their name, the Treasury House Museum, on the grounds of the Mother See of Holy Etchmiadzin in Armenia.
- 1990, was awarded the Ellis Island Medal of Honor.
- 1993, Alex Manoogian was named a National Hero of Armenia and a citizen of Armenia by President Levon Ter Petrosian, the first person outside the country to be so honored.
- 2007, at the invitation of the government of Armenia and the Armenian Apostolic Church, the remains of Marie and Alex Manoogian were moved and reinterred with full state honors on the grounds of Holy Etchmiadzin, in front of the Treasury Museum. The Archbishop, national officials and Louise Manoogian Simone, Richard Manoogian and others of their family attended the ceremony; the two children were among the speakers.
- Alex Manoogian streets in Yerevan, the capital of Armenia; in Montreal, Quebec, Canada; and in Stepanakert, the capital of Nagorno-Karabakh, were named in his honor. Alex Manoogian Street in Stepanakert had a statue of a seated Alex Manoogian on it. The statue was destroyed by Azerbaijanis after they attacked and captured Karabakh.
