= Zareh Nubar =

Armenian leader

Zareh Nubar (1883–1963; Armenian: Զարեհ Նուբար or Զարեհ Նուպար in Western Armenian) was the son of Boghos Nubar, the founder of the Armenian General Benevolent Union (AGBU) and grandson of the Egyptian Prime Minister Nubar Pasha. Nubar was born in Alexandria, Egypt, the youngest son of his father. Zareh Nubar took over the presidency of AGBU in 1932 after the tenure of Calouste Gulbenkian, and remained in the role until 1943.
