= Armenian General Benevolent Union =

Armenian organization

Armenian General Benevolent Union (AGBU)
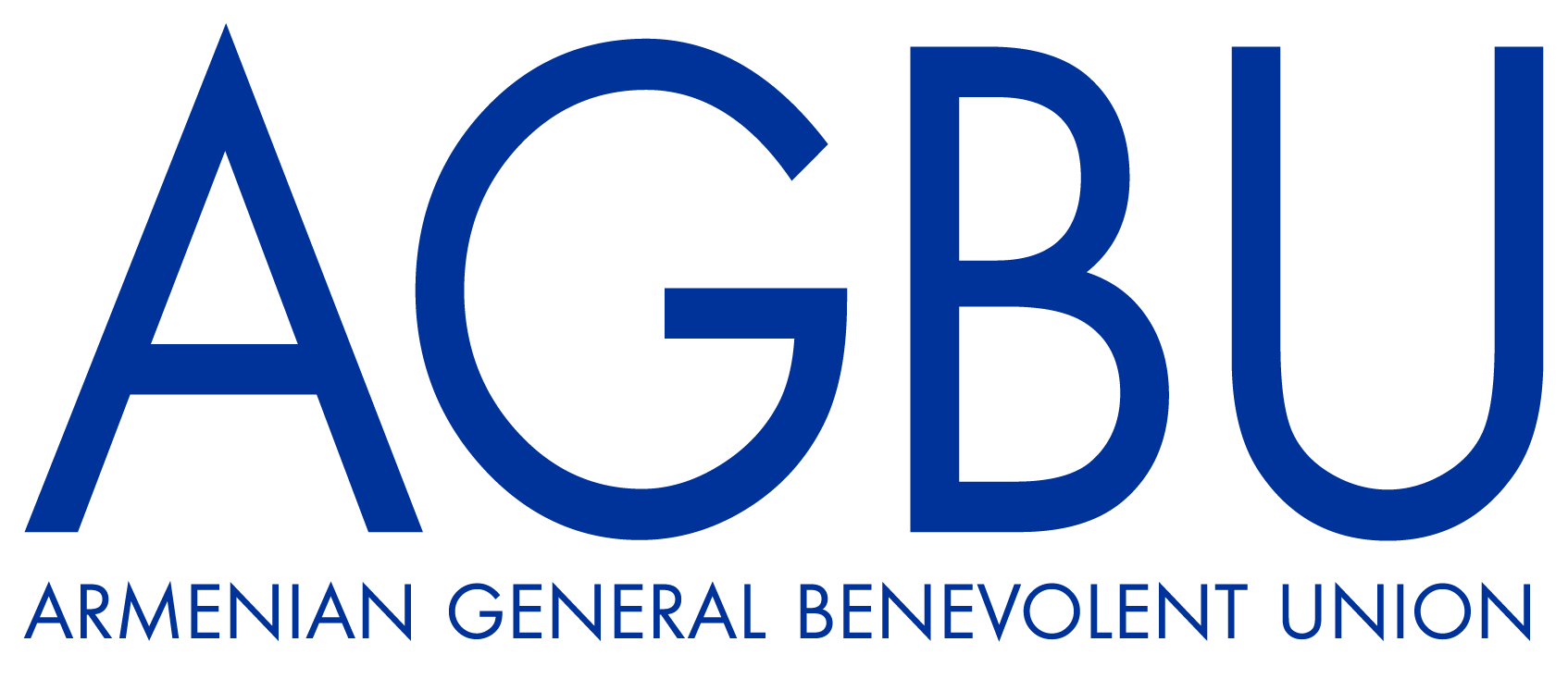
- Formation: April 15, 1906
- Type: NGO
- Headquarters: New York City, New York
- Members: 32,000
- Official language: Armenian, English, French, Spanish, Portuguese, Russian, Arabic
- President: Sam Simonian
- Founder: Boghos Nubar
- Budget: $47 million (annual)
- Website: agbu.am

The Armenian General Benevolent Union (AGBU, Eastern Armenian: Հայկական Բարեգործական Ընդհանուր Միություն, ՀԲԸՄ, Haykakan Baregortsakan Endhanur Miutyun, or Western Armenian: Հայ Բարեգործական Ընդհանուր Միութիւն,Hay Parekordzagan Enthanour Miyutyun or Hopenetmen for short, French: Union générale arménienne de bienfaisance, UGAB) is a non-profit Armenian organization established in Cairo, Egypt, in 1906. With the onset of World War II, headquarters were moved to New York City, New York.

With an annual international budget of over $47 million, AGBU preserves and promotes the Armenian identity and heritage through educational, cultural and humanitarian programs, annually serving some 500,000 Armenians in over 30 countries. In 2006, the AGBU celebrated its centenary in its headquarters in New York City. The Armenian General Benevolent Union (AGBU) was founded on April 15, 1906, in Cairo, Egypt, by the initiative of renowned national figure Boghos Nubar, son of Nubar Pasha (three times prime minister of Egypt) and other prominent representatives of the Egyptian-Armenian community to contribute to the spiritual and cultural development of the Armenian people.

The goal was to establish a union that would in every way assist the Armenian people, the future of which, as a minority in the Ottoman Empire, was endangered.

== History ==
Between 1906 and 1912, the AGBU provided the villagers of the Western Armenia with seeds, agricultural instruments, etc. It established schools and orphanages in Western Armenia, Cilicia and other Armenian-populated regions of the Ottoman Empire. In 1914, AGBU had 142 branches in Western Armenia, Cilicia, USA, Argentina, Europe and Africa with 8,533 members.

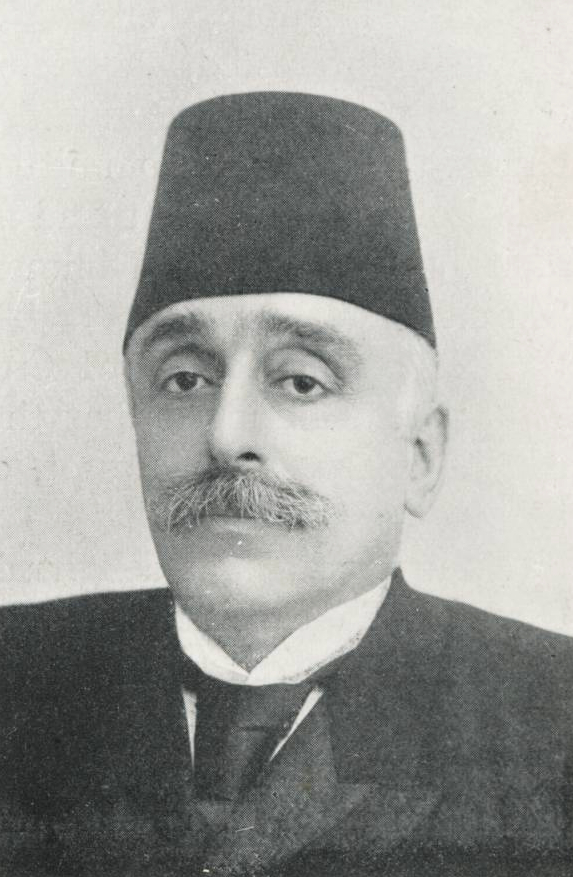
First AGBU president Boghos Nubar, the son of the prime minister of Egypt Nubar Pasha.

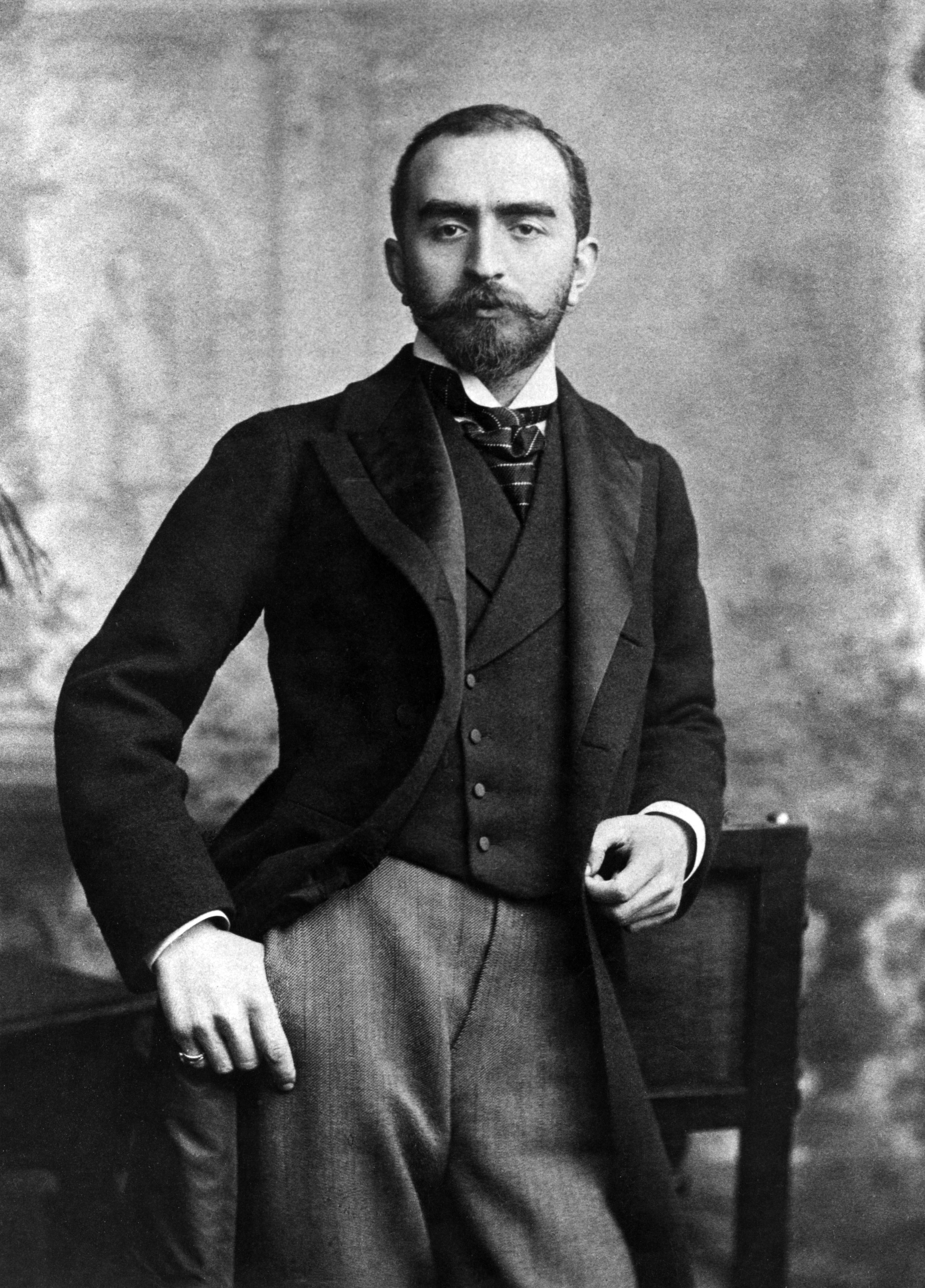
Second president of the AGBU oil tycoon Calouste Gulbenkian, who is credited with being the first person to exploit Iraqi oil.

The First World War and the Armenian genocide were turning points for both the Armenian nation and the AGBU. In 1914, Boghos Nubar left Egypt and moved to Paris. Despite the huge losses in different chapters of the union, the AGBU managed to render tangible help to the Genocide survivors. In October 1915, the Sisvan school with 1,222 students, later an orphanage and a camp for women refugees, was established by the AGBU in the desert near Port Said, Egypt. This camp is where survivors of Musa Dagh settled. In the years following the Genocide, the AGBU became mainly involved in taking care of orphans. After the war, the AGBU was reformed and founded new branches in Armenian-populated regions of the Near East, Greece, France and USA.

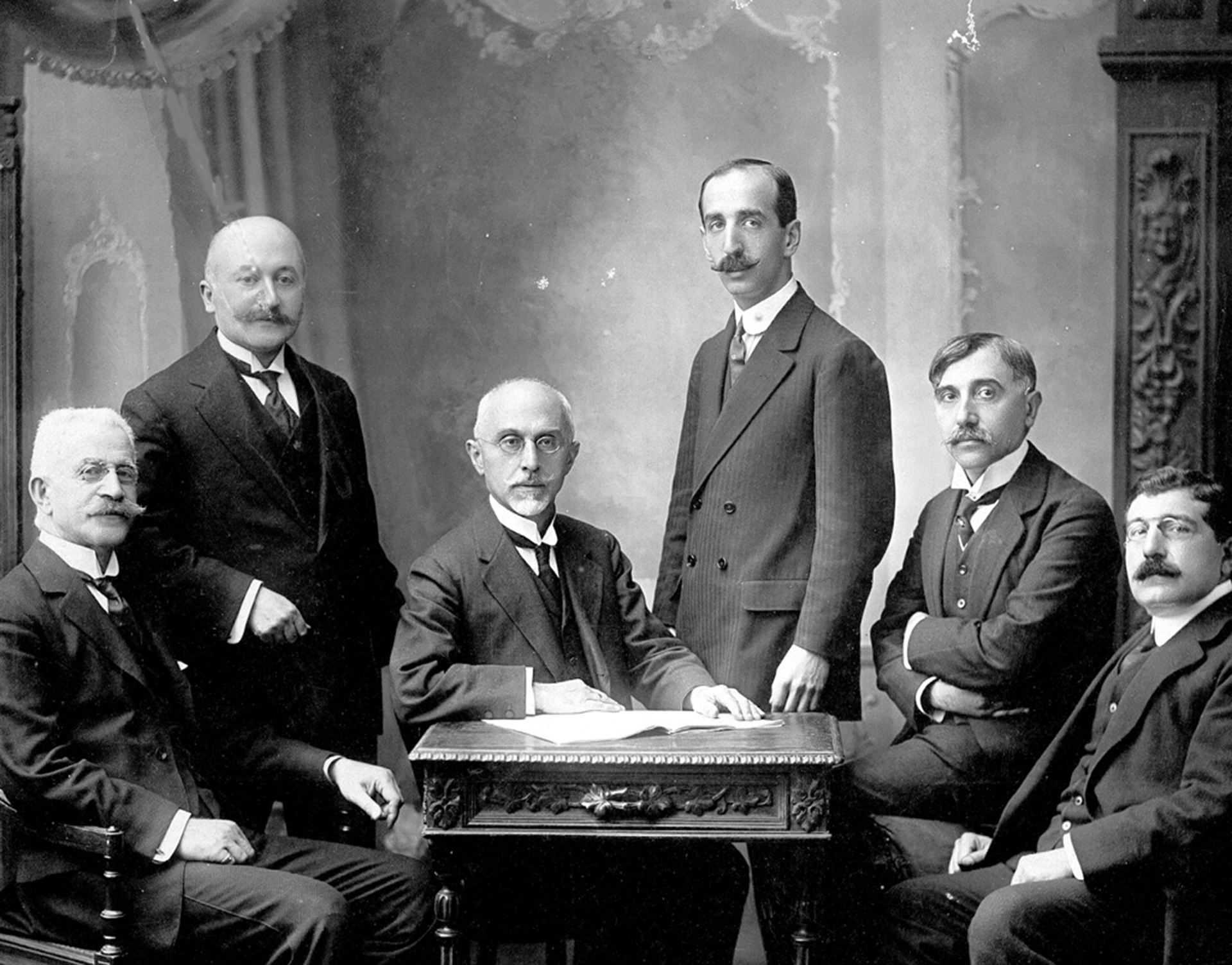
The AGBU's first European branch, founded in Manchester in 1909. From left to right: Sarkis Kuyumjian, S. Shnorhavorian, Mihran Manukian (president), M. Bakrjian, K. Funduklian, D. Iplikjian.

In 1921, the union's headquarters was moved from Cairo to Paris. After World War I, the main goal of the AGBU was to preserve and promote Armenian language, identity and heritage through educational, cultural and humanitarian programs. In 1926, AGBU established the Melkonian Educational Institution in Nicosia, Cyprus, Nubarian foundation, which provided scholarships to Armenian youngsters to study in European universities, and the Marie Nubar Dormitory in Paris in 1930.

After the death of Boghos Nubar in 1930, oil magnate and prominent Armenian figure Calouste Gulbenkian took over the presidency of AGBU. After heading the union for two years, the son of the former, Zareh Bey Nubar, replaced him and headed the union until 1940.

During World War II, the AGBU headquarters was moved from Paris to New York as a result of Nazi occupation. In 1942, Arshak Karagyozian became the fourth president of the AGBU.

The AGBU's activities aimed at national preservation became more effective during the post-war period, especially in Alex Manoogian's tenure between 1953–1989. The AGBU expanded and became the biggest and most influential Diaspora-Armenian organization in the world. In 1954, Alex Manoogian founded the "Alex and Marie Manoogian" cultural fund; in 1968 he established the "Alex Manoogian" cultural fund. Through these funds, a number of educational and other establishments were built over the next several years.

Today, the AGBU has chapters in 72 cities in 30 countries around the world, with 22,000 members, 120 branches, 27 cultural centers spread worldwide in the US, Europe, Near East, South America and Australia. The AGBU has 24 schools (6,600 students) and funds more than 16 educational establishments. The AGBU has two libraries, one in Paris and the other in New York City.

In 1989, Louise Manoogian Simone, the daughter of Alex Manoogian, became the president of the AGBU. It gave a new breath to the strengthening of ties between the Armenians of Armenia and diaspora. In 1988, immediately following the Spitak earthquake, the AGBU organized the transportation of food, clothes, and medicine to the disaster zone. In 1990, the AGBU opened a representative office in Yerevan. Restarting its activities in Armenia after a 50-year interval, along with humanitarian assistance, the AGBU carries out projects aimed at and contributing to the development of the country.

In 1995, the AGBU founded the first Young Professionals (YP) Group in Los Angeles; today, there are 37 YP Groups and Partners worldwide.

Since 2002 Berge Setrakian, partner at renowned law firm DLA Piper, is the president of AGBU.

In 2017, the AGBU opened the AGBU Vatche and Tamar Manoukian Performing Arts Center in Pasadena, California in the United States.

In 2017, AGBU, in collaboration with the Armenian Assembly of America, the Armenian National Committee of America, Children of Armenia Fund, and the Diocese and Prelacy of the Armenian Apostolic Church, launched "The Promise to Educate" campaign to send copies of director Terry George's 2016 film The Promise and relevant Armenian genocide curriculum resources to public educational institutions across the United States.

== Centers, chapters and offices ==
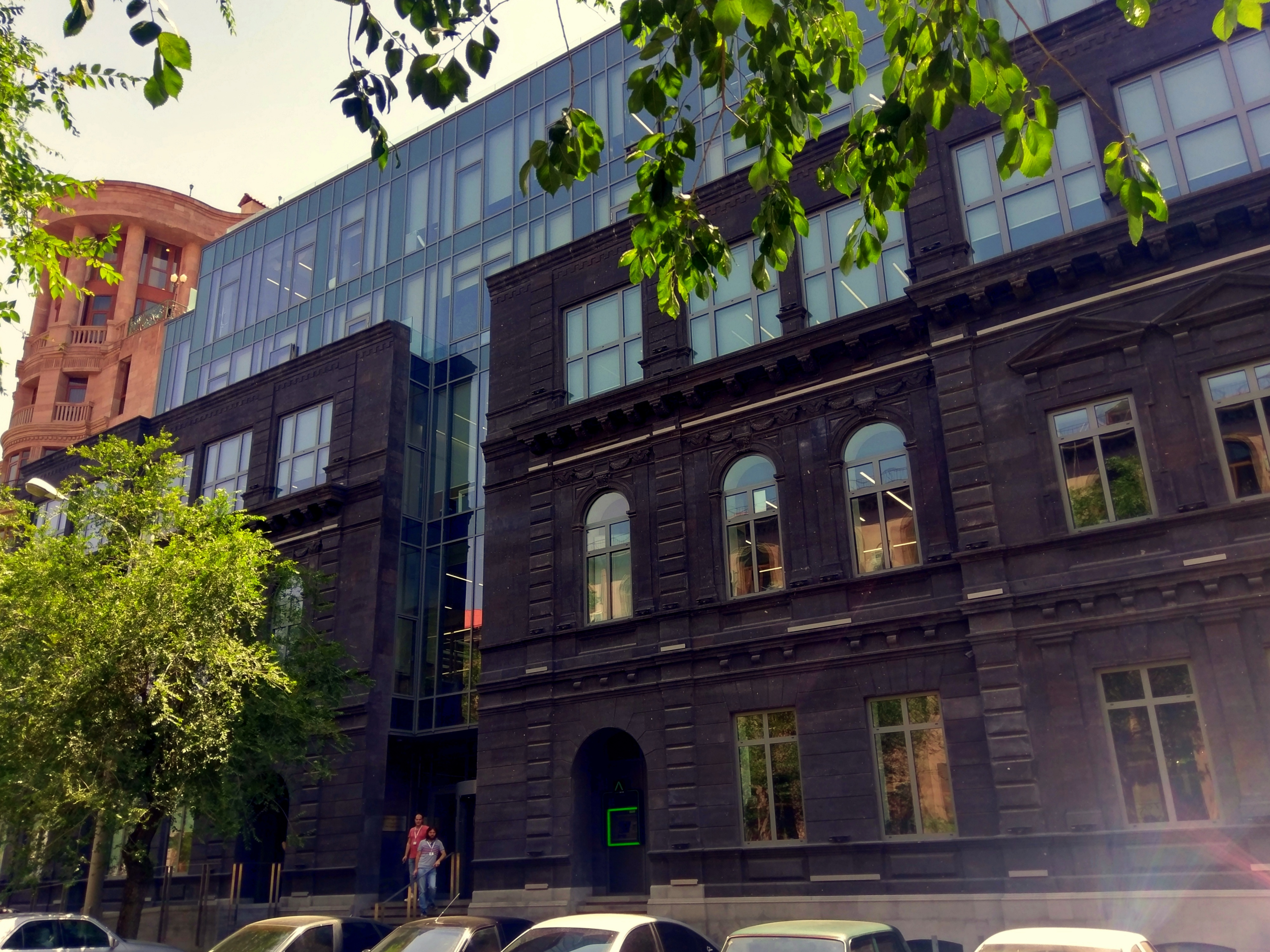
The AGBU head offices in Yerevan on Melik-Adamayan street

- Argentina: Buenos Aires, Córdoba
- Armenia: Yerevan
- Australia: Melbourne, Sydney
- Austria: Vienna
- Brazil: São Paulo
- Bulgaria: Burgas, Dobrich, Haskovo, Plovdiv, Ruse, Silistra, Sliven, Sofia, Varna, Yambol
- Canada: Montreal, Toronto, Vancouver
- Cyprus: Nicosia, Larnaca
- Egypt: Alexandria, Cairo
- Ethiopia: Addis Ababa
- France: Lyon, Marseille, Nice, Paris, Saint-Étienne-Saint-Chamond, Valence, Vienne
- Germany: Berlin
- Greece: Athens, Thessaloniki
- Iraq: Baghdad
- Iran: Tehran
- Lebanon: Beirut, Sin el Fil, Alay, Zahle, Tripoli, Sidon
- Italy: Milan
- South Africa: Johannesburg
- Switzerland: Geneva
- Syria: Aleppo, Damascus, Qamishli, Kessab, Latakia
- United Kingdom: London
- United States: Boston, Canoga Park, Chicago, Cleveland, Detroit, Fresno, California, Glendale, California-San Gabriel, California, Houston, Manhattan Beach, California, Los Angeles, New England District, Oakland, San Francisco, Orange County, Pasadena, California, Philadelphia, Providence, San Diego, San Fernando Valley, Silicon Valley, Washington, D.C., Watertown, Massachusetts
- Uruguay: Montevideo.
- Netherlands: Almelo.

== Education ==
AGBU operates 24 day and Saturday schools. Some of the schools run by the AGBU include:

- AGBU Manoogian-Demirdjian School, Canoga Park, Los Angeles, California
- AGBU Alexander Primary School, Sydney, Australia
- Manoogian School, Southfield, Michigan
- Alex Manoogian School, Montreal, Quebec.
- Marie Manoogian School, Buenos Aires, Argentina
- AGBU Armenian Central High School, Aleppo, Syria (since 1954),
- Nubarian (primary school) and Alex Manooguian (secondary school), Montevideo, Uruguay.

Shuttered Schools:

- AGBU Vatche and Tamar Manoukian High School, Pasadena, California

It awards scholarship grants and loans to more than 500 students worldwide; it supports the American University of Armenia and Yerevan State University.

The Union has funded a number of benevolent causes, including supporting the Lord Byron School, which was donated by the British government following the earthquake in Armenia in 1988. The school has continued to twin with the Holgate School in Nottingham.

== Youth and culture ==
Through its global network of 69 chapters, young professionals groups, centers and offices, the organization sponsors numerous cultural and humanitarian programs, including children's centers, soup kitchens, summer camps, athletics and Scouts, internship and mentoring programs and the performing arts. It claims to be the world's largest non-profit Armenian organization.

=== Sayat Nova International Composition Competition ===
One of AGBU's cultural efforts is the Sayat Nova International Composition Competition. Started in 2006, Sayat Nova International Composition Competition introduces the greater music community to Armenian cultural and inspires talented young composers. The competition seeks works written for a mixed ensemble of Armenian and Western instruments and set to the text of an Armenian poet. In 2006, the poetry of Sayat Nova was featured, in 2014 it was Daniel Varoujan, and 2016 will feature Grigor Narekatsi.

== Publications ==
With more than a dozen publications in six languages:

- Ararat Quarterly (first published in 1959) A quarterly of literature, history, popular culture and the arts.
- AGBU News (New York, NY, USA)
- AGBU Voice (Bulgaria)
- Arek Monthly (Cairo, Egypt)
- Desilk (Scarborough, Canada)
- Deghegadou (Cairo, Egypt)
- Generation 3 (Argentina)
- Hayatsk (Aleppo, Syria)
- Hoosharar (New York, NY, USA)
- Khosnag (Beirut, Lebanon)
- Mioutune (Sydney, Australia)
- Parekordzagani Tsayn (Sofia, Bulgaria)
- Revue Arménienne des Questions Contemporaines (France)
- UGAB-France (Paris, France)
- Yeram (Damascus, Syria)
- Generacion 3 (Buenos Aires, Argentina)
- AGBU Scout "Սկաուտ" (Yerevan, Armenia)

== Presidents ==
- Boghos Nubar (1906–1928) – Founder
- Calouste Gulbenkian (1930–1932)
- Zareh Nubar (1932–1943)
- Arshag Karagheusian (1943–1953) of A & M Karagheusian
- Alex Manoogian (1953–1989) – Honorary Life President.
- Louise Manoogian Simone (1989–2002)
- Berge Setrakian (2002–2024)
- Sam Simonian (2024–present)

== See also ==
- Armenian Relief Society
- Nubar Library
- Social issues in Armenia
