= Court of Cassation of Armenia =

Court in Armenia

- Հայաստանի վճռաբեկ դատարան
- Court logo
- Established: 10 July 1998
- Jurisdiction: Armenia
- Location: 5 Vazgen Sargsyan Street, Yerevan
- Motto: "To create a rule-based environment by developing the concept of predictable justice"
- Authorised by: Constitution of Armenia
- Website: Official website

President
- Currently: Lilit Tadevosyan
- Since: 9 February 2021

The Court of Cassation of Armenia (Armenian: Հայաստանի վճռաբեկ դատարան, romanized: Hayastani vchrrabek dataran) is the highest court of the three-level judicial system in Armenia. The court, established in 1998, is located in Yerevan.

== History ==
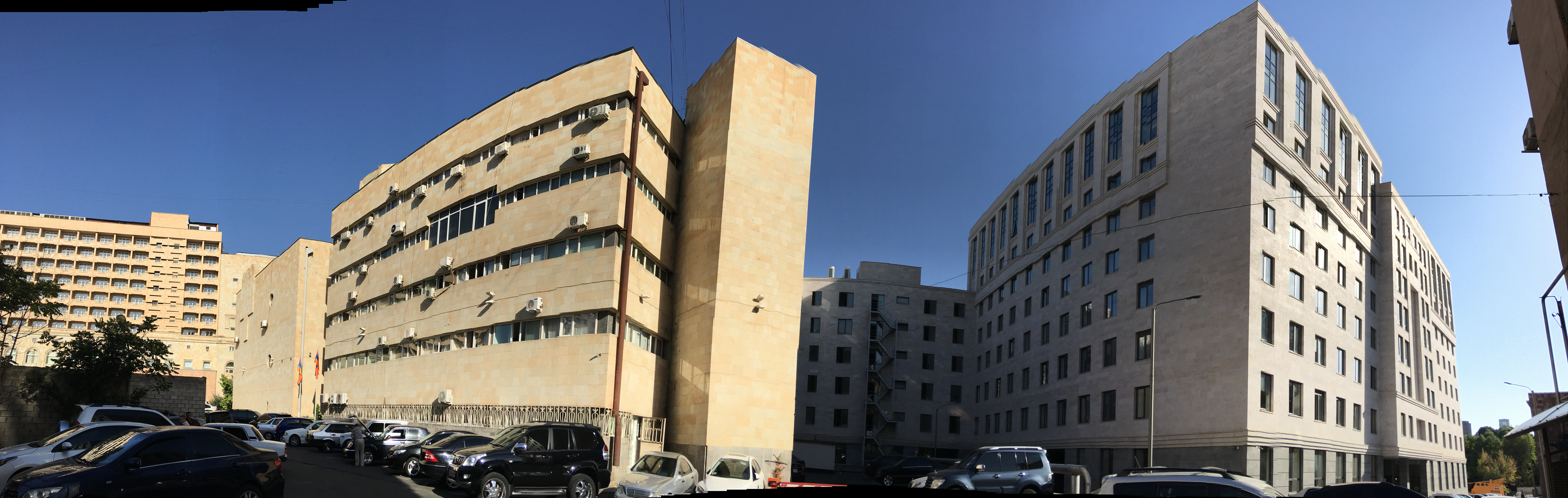
The Court of Cassation

The court was founded on 10 July 1998. According to Article 171 of the Armenian constitution, it is the highest court in Armenia, except in the sphere of constitutional justice, in which the Constitutional Court of Armenia maintains authority.

== Functions ==
The Court of Cassation was established to oversee the advancement of human rights in Armenia and tackle corruption. It seeks to eliminate violations of human rights, review judicial acts, contribute to the strengthening of the domestic legal system, and protect the integrity of the rule of law in the country.

The Court of Cassation ensures the harmony of domestic legislation and legal practices with the legal positions and adopted approaches of the Constitutional Court of Armenia and the European Court of Human Rights on the interpretation of the European Convention on Human Rights and Fundamental Freedoms. It also develops legislative regulations and brings them into line with advanced international standards.

== International cooperation ==
Since 2017, the Court of Cassation has been a member of the Superior Courts Network of the European Court of Human Rights. The court also cooperates with the European Union on the implementation of best practices.

On 7 June 2022, members of the court held high-level discussions with representatives of the Council of Europe.

On 14 June 2022, the court hosted a meeting with the President of the Court of the Eurasian Economic Union.

On 20 February 2023, the court presided over the inaugural organizational session of the Council of Presidents of the Supreme Courts of the Commonwealth of Independent States participating members.

On 3 May 2023, members of the court met with officials of the United States Embassy in Armenia.

== See also ==
- Legal system of Armenia
- List of supreme courts by country
- Ministry of Justice of Armenia
- Politics of Armenia
- Prosecutor General of Armenia
- Social issues in Armenia
