= Law of Armenia =

Armenian law (Armenian: Հայ իրավունք), that being the modern Legal system of Armenia (Armenian: Հայաստանի իրավական համակարգ), is a system of law acted in Armenia.

== History of law in Armenia ==
The modern legal system of Armenia was founded on 21 September 1991 following the 1991 Armenian independence referendum and by the country's declaration of independence on 23 September 1991. For the evolution of Armenian law this phase was a turning point in the nation’s historical development, because it marked the beginning of the establishment of an independent, sustainable legal system guaranteeing human rights and freedoms, legitimate interests, and welfare of citizens. The highest legal document of Armenian state and society – the Constitution of Armenia – was approved following the 5 July 1995 referendum.

The legal system of Armenia shares the patterns and characteristics that describe the legal systems of other civil law countries. The Constitution of Armenia is based on the model of the French Constitution, and several principal aspects of the Civil Code of Armenia depict the model code of civil law elaborated for the Commonwealth of Independent States. In previous years, the impact of German administrative legislation on the development of the relevant legal framework of Armenia has been noted. The legal system being built on new ideological and institutional merits continues to bear influence on various practices inherent to the legal procedures of former Republics of the Soviet Union.

Constitutional justice in Armenia is carried out by the Constitutional Court of Armenia, and by virtue of the article 92 of Constitution and the article 15th of Judicial Code it is the Court of Cassation of Armenia which is vested in the formation of predictable and consistent jurisprudence.

Armenia is a secular state, which presupposes regulation of public relationships solely by the state enacted legal acts. However, the Armenian Apostolic Church played and continues to play an essential role in the protection of humanitarian values constituting an indivisible part of the moral-physiological foundations of the Armenian legal system. For the aforementioned reason the wording of article 8.1 of the Armenian Constitution states: "The Republic of Armenia recognizes the exclusive historical mission of the Armenian Apostolic Church as a national church, in the spiritual life, development of the national culture and preservation of the national identity of the people of Armenia."

== Legal system of Armenia and international cooperation ==
Armenia participates in several bilateral and multilateral international treaties. International agreements become a constitutive part of the Armenian legal system when they are ratified or adopted by the relevant national authorities. Moreover, the wording of Article 6 of the Constitution indicates: "If a ratified international treaty stipulates norms other than those stipulated in the laws, the norms of the treaty shall prevail. International treaties contradicting Constitution cannot be ratified."

Armenia is a member of several international treaties in the field of human rights and fundamental freedoms. Including the following:

- European Convention for the Prevention of Torture and Inhuman or Degrading Treatment or Punishment
- European Convention on Human Rights and Fundamental Freedoms
- Convention on the Prevention and Punishment of the Crime of Genocide
- Universal Declaration of Human Rights

Armenia is also a contracting party of the European Court of Human Rights and the International Court of Justice. A comprehensive list of international treaties the Republic of Armenia has acceded/ratified may be found in the following Human Rights, 3rd edition.

== The system of law ==
The system of Armenian law is another component of the legal system. It comprises the structural elements such as norms, institutes, and branches that are classified based on various criteria. Thereby the branches of law are usually classified into public and private law or substantive and procedural.

The branches of Armenian Law are divided under the classification criteria of substantive and procedural law:

=== Substantive law ===
Constitutional Law
Civil Law
Criminal Law
Administrative Law
Financial Law
Labor Law
Environmental Law
Land Law
Customs Law
Family Law
Penitentiary Law

=== Procedural law ===
Civil Procedure Law
Criminal Procedure Law
Administrative Procedure Law

== The system of legislation ==
The system of legislation encompasses all the relevant legal acts regulating public and private relations within that legal system. The term "system of legislation" is applied broadly to refer to various legal acts of Armenia and, in a narrow definition, to refer to the laws adopted by the National Assembly of Armenia.

All acts of the Armenian legal system are available on arlis. Alphabetically classified laws are available via the web-page of the National Assembly of Armenia. The laws enacted before 2001 are available in English and Russian translations. The decisions of the Constitutional Court are available on Constitutional Court of Armenia.

== Recent developments ==
On 24 November 2017, Armenia and the European Union finalized the Armenia–EU Comprehensive and Enhanced Partnership Agreement. The agreement advances the bilateral relations between the European Union and Armenia to a new, partnership level and regulates cooperation in political and economic sectors. The agreement is also designed to bring Armenian laws and regulations gradually closer to the EU acquis. The agreement contains provisions to support policy and legal reforms, while strengthening the rule of law and democracy in Armenia.

On 5 April 2024, Armenia signed a cooperation agreement with Eurojust.

On 26 March 2025, Armenia's parliament adopted a bill supporting Armenia's accession to the EU. The bill officially became law and calls on the Armenian government to begin the process of gaining membership of the EU.

== See also ==
- Armenia in the Council of Europe
- Crime in Armenia
- List of national legal systems
- Police of Armenia
- Politics of Armenia
- Prosecutor General of Armenia
- Social issues in Armenia
