= Simon Kamsarakan =

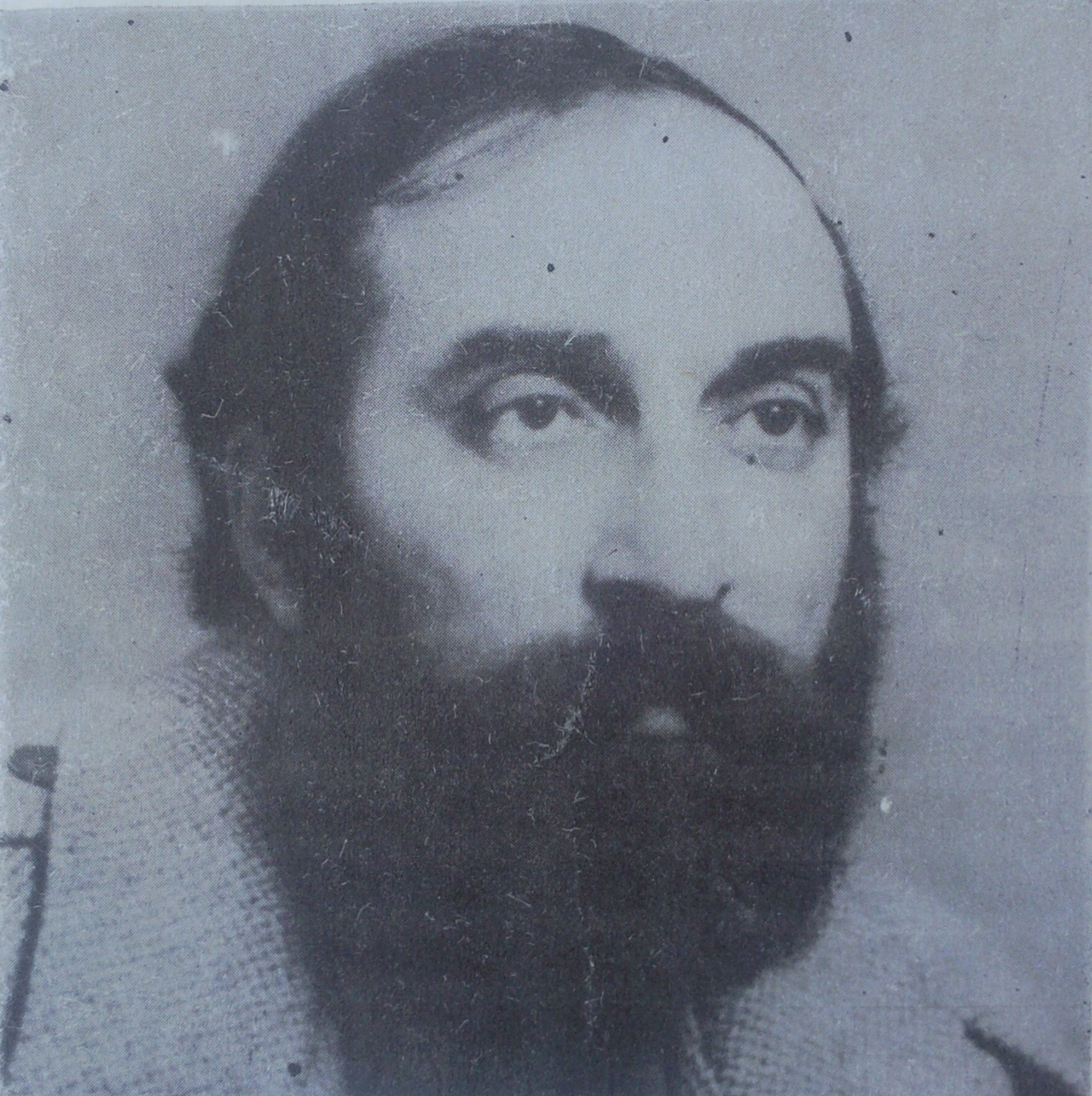
Simon Kamsarakan

Simon Kamsarakan (Simon Rafiki Shahazizyan) (Armenian: Սիմոն Կամսարական, 1950, Ashtarak – 2011, Yerevan) was an Armenian physicist, public activist, a Member of Republic of Armenia Public Council on Defense and National Security and Founding Director of National Institute of Fundamental Sciences, which he founded in 1992 in Armenia.

== Biography ==
Simon Shahazizyan was born in a family of a military officer. In 1974 he finished physical department of the Yerevan State University. He started his political activities in 1960's. On April 24, 1970, he was arrested by Soviet authorities as an organizer of a meeting dedicated to Armenian genocide recognition. He was one of the founders of Republican Party of Armenia, headed Party's board from 1992 to 1993, then left the party after it supported Levon Ter-Petrosyan's policy. From 1977 to 1992 Kamsarakan worked at the Yerevan Physics Institute.

In November 2009 Kamsarakan requested Prosecutor General of Armenia Aghvan Hovsepyan to institute a criminal case against Armenian Foreign minister Eduard Nalbandyan for violating constitutional order and abusing authority to the detriment of the Armenia's national security and defense. Kamsarakan found that Armenian minister is forced to provide information on Armenian-Turkish Protocols.

== Bibliography ==
- Երկիր մոլորակի ցամաքի բնապատմական ձեւավորումը, Սիմոն Կամսարական, Հիմնարար գիտությունների հայկական կենտրոն, Տիւ, 1999, ISBN 5808004039, 76 p.
