= Social issues in Armenia =

There are several social issues in Armenia including poverty, high unemployment rates, corruption, and inadequate public services.

== Background ==
Following the breakup of the Soviet Union in 1991 (which resulted in the Armenian Soviet Socialist Republic becoming the independent state of Armenia), masses of newly unemployed people found themselves with no income. The planned economy of Armenia was predominantly based on industry and trade. Following Armenia's independence, society was suddenly forced to rebuild the economy in a national shift towards economic liberalism. While some citizens who lost their livelihoods opted to transition into agriculture.

Between 2012 and 2018, GDP in Armenia grew by 40.7%. GDP growth is projected to grow in 2021 up to 3.4 percent and will increase up to 4.3 percent in 2022. Following the 2018 Armenian revolution, the Government of Armenia prioritized eliminating corruption and strengthening the economy. The government launched numerous criminal cases against alleged corruption by former high-ranking government officials and their relatives, parliamentarians, the former presidents, and in a few instances, members of the judiciary in a bid to tackle systemic corruption.

== Poverty in Armenia ==
According to the World Bank, after a sharp increase in poverty between 2008 and 2009 due to the 2008 financial crisis, poverty in Armenia has dropped continuously since 2010. The national poverty rate fell to its lowest level since 2004, reaching 23.5% in 2018 from a peak of 35.8 percent in 2010.

As of 2019, 26.4% of Armenians live below the national poverty line, with the COVID-19 pandemic and the effects of the 2020 Nagorno-Karabakh war playing a role. Rural populations are particularly vulnerable to poverty. Armenia's poorest citizens are concentrated along the nation's borders, in mountain areas and in earthquake zones. The Shirak Province in north-eastern Armenia, Lori Province in northern Armenia, and Kotayk Province in central Armenia are among the poorest provinces.

=== Child poverty ===
According to UNICEF, despite overall poverty reduction in Armenia, almost one in three children in the country are poor. The family benefit (FB) scheme is the largest support program to poor families. While the coverage of the population by the FB in Armenia is stable (13.6% of the population in 2016), its targeting needs improvement, so that the poorest and most disadvantaged are not left without essential support.

Since 2010, with UNICEF and World Bank support, Armenia has embarked on the reform of integrated social services in the country, introducing individual case management, local social planning and cooperation among social service providers.

In addition, Armenian law prohibits the sexual exploitation of children and provides for prison sentences of seven to 15 years for conviction of violations. Conviction for child pornography is punishable by imprisonment for up to seven years. The minimum age for consensual sex is 16. On 18 June 2020, the government established a referral mechanism for child victims of trafficking and exploitation.

== Disability rights ==
In 2021, authorities remained committed to ending institutionalization of children with disabilities. In April 2021, the government approved the 2020-2023 Comprehensive Program and Action Plan on Fulfillment of the Right to Live in a Family and Harmonious Development of the Child. The program features an alternative care service network, including specialized services for children with disabilities. Armenia plans to guarantee inclusive education by 2025, whereby children with and without disabilities study together in community schools.

A bill on rights of people with disabilities, which is set to replace a 1993 law and contains significant improvements, has not yet been ratified by the parliament.

== LGBT rights ==
According to Human Rights Watch, lesbian, gay, bisexual, and transgender (LGBT) people continue to face harassment, discrimination, and violence in Armenia.

In January 2021, the United Nations Human Rights Council held the Universal Periodic Review of Armenia. In the council's report, Armenia received numerous recommendations, including to ratify the Istanbul Convention without further delay; strengthen anti-discrimination policies; and criminalize all forms of torture and ill-treatment.

== Environmental issues ==
According to Amnesty International, mining for minerals has created significant challenges for environmental protection in Armenia.

Deforestation was particularly severe during the early 1990s. However, initiatives like the Armenia Tree Project has seen significant reforestation efforts. The initiative has planted more than 6.5 million trees in communities throughout Armenia.

== Democracy and governance in Armenia ==
Since Armenia declared independence in 1991, the country has undergone significant political changes. These changes have influenced the development of democratic governance, which has evolved through constitutional reforms, political transitions, and the strengthening of democratic institutions. The framework for governance in Armenia is defined by the Constitution of Armenia, adopted in 1995 and amended in 2005 to maintain democratic institutions and safeguard human rights protections.

== Political freedom and civil liberties ==
According to the Freedom House Freedom in the World 2024 report, Armenia is classified as "partly free," reflecting both positive progress and ongoing challenges. The report highlights improvements in the electoral process, particularly those following the 2018 Velvet Revolution, which marked a democratic power transfer. However, challenges remain in areas such as judicial independence, media freedom, and political polarization. These issues impact both political rights and civil liberties, indicating the need for continued reforms.

== The impact of the 2018 Velvet Revolution ==
The 2018 Velvet Revolution was a pivotal moment in Armenia's political history, leading to the resignation of long-time leader Serzh Sargsyan and the ascent of Nikol Pashinyan as prime minister. The revolution was sparked by mass protests against corruption and the perceived threats to democratic principles. As noted by the International Crisis Group, while the revolution led to a renewed focus on democratic reforms, challenges remain in strengthening independent institutions and promoting a more inclusive political environment. These challenges continue to affect the quality of democracy in Armenia and its people's everyday lives.

== International cooperation and governance reforms ==
Armenia's governance reforms have been supported by international organizations such as the United Nations Development Programme (UNDP). The UNDP's national report on Armenia underscores efforts to enhance public engagement and transparency. International cooperation has played an essential role in supporting these reforms, which include judicial improvements, anti-corruption measures, and initiatives designed to increase public participation in key decision-making processes. Despite these positive developments, Armenia continues to face significant challenges, including the need for further judicial independence, electoral reforms, and reduced political polarization. Continued international collaboration and active citizen involvement remain crucial for sustaining democratic progress.

== Other issues ==
A 2020 report conducted by the United States Department of State found that Armenian authorities generally respected rights of citizens as enshrined by the Constitution of Armenia. This includes, the right to peaceful assembly, the right to a fair trial, allowing academic and cultural freedom, freedom of religion, freedom of movement, not restricting or disrupting access to the internet or censoring online content, respecting freedom of expression for citizens and media, upholding rights to privacy and confidentiality, and ensuring no political prisoners were held in the country.

=== Refugees ===
In addition, the report concluded that authorities cooperated with the United Nations High Commissioner for Refugees to safeguard the rights of refugees, asylum seekers, and prevent abuse towards migrants. As of 10 August 2020, there were 976 stateless persons in Armenia. Armenian law provides for the provision of nationality to stateless children born within the country's territory.

=== Elections ===
In 2018, the Organization for Security and Co-operation in Europe, determined that elections in Armenia are generally free and fair. The report noted that election campaigning generally allowed equal opportunities for all contestants and that fundamental freedoms of association, assembly, expression and movement were fully respected. The report also concluded that Armenian law does not restrict the registration or activity of political parties.

=== Domestic violence ===
Domestic violence is prosecuted under general statutes dealing with violence and carries various sentences depending on the charge (murder, battery, light battery, rape, etc.). Meanwhile, rape is a criminal offense, and conviction carries a maximum sentence of 15 years. Domestic violence against women was widespread and was exacerbated by COVID-19 restrictions on movement. According to some officials, the absence of a definition of domestic violence in the criminal code hampered their ability to fight domestic violence.

=== Discrimination ===
Men and women enjoy equal legal status, however, discrimination based on gender was a continuing problem in both the public and private sectors. There were reports of discrimination against women with respect to occupation, employment, and pay. Women remain underrepresented in leadership positions in all branches and at all levels of government.

=== Prostitution ===
Prostitution in Armenia is illegal under administrative law (Article 179.1). Related activities such as running a brothel and pimping are prohibited by the Criminal Code, although there are known to be brothels in the capital, Yerevan and in Gyumri.

== International cooperation ==
=== Effects of partnership between Armenia and the ADB ===
The partnership between the Asian Development Bank (ADB) and Armenia affected the economy of Armenia positively. One of the advantages of this partnership includes the modernization of technologies and innovation. It has also created a better business environment for the locals and foreign investors, as well as increase private sector investment and overall economic growth.

According to the Asian Development Bank, as of 2020, the unemployment rate increased to 20.2%, while the proportion of employed people who receive less than $1.9 PPP a day is 0.3%. Meanwhile, the under 5 child mortality rate equals 12 per 1000 children.

Eliminating poverty is one of the sustainable development goals promoted by the ADB. In addition, the other primary goals are zero hunger, good health and well-being, gender equality, clean water and sanitation, affordable and clean energy, decent work and economic growth, industry, innovation, and infrastructure, reducing inequalities, growing sustainable cities and communities, promoting responsible consumption and production, and developing further partnerships to achieve these goals.

=== Effects of partnership between Armenia and the EU ===
The European Union is the biggest provider of financial support and a key reform partner in Armenia. As part of the European Neighbourhood Policy, Armenia benefits from EU financial assistance. The amount allocated to Armenia depends on Armenia's commitment to reforms. In July 2021, EU Commissioner for Neighborhood and Enlargement Oliver Varhelyi announced that the EU will be granting an amount of approximately US$3.1 billion in aid to Armenia, a 62% increase than the amount promised before.

The Armenia-EU Comprehensive and Enhanced Partnership Agreement was entered into force on 1 March 2021. The agreement advances the bilateral relations between the EU and Armenia and includes clauses on improving democracy, justice, protecting human rights and minority rights, rural development, employment and social affairs, fighting corruption, and increasing environmental protection.

== See also ==
- Anti-Armenian sentiment in Azerbaijan
- Armenia and the United Nations
- Armenia in the Council of Europe
- Capital punishment in Armenia
- Europe in Law Association
- Helsinki Citizens' Assembly–Vanadzor
- Helsinki Committee of Armenia
- Human rights in Armenia
- Open Society Foundations–Armenia
- Social protection in Armenia
