= Anna Vardapetyan =

Armenian lawyer

Anna Vardapetyan (Armenian: Աննա Վարդապետյան, born on February 18, 1986) is an Armenian lawyer who has been the Prosecutor General of Armenia since 15 September 2022.

== Education ==
Anna Vardapetyan is a graduate of the Yerevan State University Department of Law. After receiving her master's degree in 2008, she pursued her post-graduate studies in the same department. In 2012, she defended a thesis entitled "The Criminal-Legal Problems with the Transplantation of Human Organs and Tissues".

From 2007 until March 2013, Vardapetyan worked at the Court of Cassation of Armenia, ranking from the post of a Junior Specialist to a Senior Aide to the Chairman. Between 2014 and 2018, she was a deputy chief of the Judicial Department and a Secretary at the Council of Judges. In 2018, Vardapetyan was appointed an Advisor to the Minister of Justice of Armenia and held the post until early 2019.

In April 2019, Vardapetyan was promoted to the rank of a Deputy Minister of Justice, an office which she held until November the same year. From 2 March until 14 September 2022 she served as an aide to the Prime Minister of Armenia.

Anna Vardapetyan was elected as the Prosecutor General by the National Assembly on 29 June 2022.

== Additional information ==
Anna Vardapatyan has been a member of the London-based Royal Institute of International Affairs since 2015. She is an author and co-author of over 20 scientific articles, scientific-practical manuals, analytical reviews and books.

From 2016 until 2021, Vardapetyan was a member of professional board at the YSU Department of Law. On 22 June 2022, she was appointed as a member of the YSU Board of Trustees subject to the Prime Minister's decision.

Vardapetyan speaks Armenian, Russian, and English.

== Personal life ==
Vardapetyan is married.
