= Armenian Dream =

Armenian Dream Party Հայկական երազանքի կուսակցություն
- Leader: Armen Mkrtchyan
- Founded: 2018
- Headquarters: Yerevan
- National Assembly: 0 / 107

Armenian Dream (Armenian: Հայկական երազանքի կուսակցություն) is an Armenian political party. It was founded in 2018 and is currently led by Armen Mkrtchyan.

== History ==
The founding congress of the party was held on 24 October 2018, Armen Mkrtchyan was nominated as chairman. While the party did not directly participate in the 2018 Armenian parliamentary election, several party members ran under the We Alliance electoral list. Following the election, the We Alliance won just 2.0% of the popular vote, failing to win any seats in the National Assembly.

After the election, the Armenian Dream party congratulated the winning My Step Alliance and Nikol Pashinyan on his election as Prime Minister. The party further stated that the election was free and fair, and that citizens finally disavowed the former ruling Republican Party.

The party does not maintain any representation within the National Assembly and currently acts as an extra-parliamentary force.

In March 2023, the party participated in local elections in the Ani district of Shirak Province.

== Ideology ==
The party's declaration states that, "The velvet revolution lifted the heavy yoke of the criminal-oligarchic system from the shoulders of the Armenian citizens and now a new, truly democratic political and economic system of government must be created to achieve the final victory of the revolution."

== See also ==
- Programs of political parties in Armenia
