= Lilit Tadevosyan =

Armenian judge (born 1978)

- Լիլիթ Թադևոսյան

President of the Court of Cassation of Armenia
- Incumbent
- Assumed office 9 February 2021
- Preceded by: Yervand Khundkaryan

Personal details
- Born: 1978 (age 47–48) Yerevan, Armenia SSR
- Children: 2
- Education: Yerevan State University

Lilit Zelim Tadevosyan (Armenian: Լիլիթ Զելիմի Թադևոսյան; born 1978) is an Armenian judge. She has been serving as president of the Court of Cassation of Armenia since 2021.

== Early life and education ==
Tadevosyan was born in 1978 in Yerevan, Armenia SSR. She graduated with honors in law from Yerevan State University in 1998, subsequently earning a master’s degree in 2001 and a doctorate in law from the Academic Council of the University that same year.

== Career ==
She began her career with the Prosecutor General of Armenia in 1998, serving as an investigator, senior investigator, assistant prosecutor, and prosecutor before becoming a senior prosecutor in the Department for Corruption and Organized Crime. She also served on the Scientific-Methodological Council of the Prosecutor General's Office.

Alongside her legal career, she lectured at Yerevan State University and the Russian-Armenian University between 2000 and 2011. Tadevosyan has authored more than 60 scholarly publications, including five monographs.

She was appointed a judge of the Criminal Court of Appeal on 30 June 2012 by the President of Armenia, Serzh Sargsyan. In 2016, she became a judge of the Criminal Chamber of the Court of Cassation of Armenia and was appointed chairperson of the chamber for a six-year term in 2018. In October 2020, the Supreme Judicial Council nominated her to preside over the Court of Cassation of Armenia as the successor to Yervand Khundkaryan. On 9 February 2021 the National Assembly appointed Tadevosyan as president of the Court of Cassation. In a secret ballot, she received 102 votes in favor and one against. In her address to the Assembly, she noted that one of the main problems is the judges’ heavy workload, and she spoke about the importance of the judicial independence and autonomy.

== Personal life ==
She is married and have two children.
