= Europe in Law Association =

Organization

- Europe in Law Association logo
- Abbreviation: ELA
- Founded: 2011; 15 years ago
- Type: Non-governmental organization
- Legal status: Nonprofit
- Purpose: Anti-corruption, human rights in Armenia, judicial reform
- Headquarters: Yerevan
- Region served: Armenia
- Methods: Advocacy, capacity building, legal aid, research
- President: Lousineh Hakobyan
- Website: Europe in Law Association

Europe in Law Association (ELA) (Armenian: Իրավունքի Եվրոպա ասոցիացիան, romanized: Iravunk’i Yevropa asots’iats’ian) is a human rights non-governmental organization in Armenia. It was founded in 2011 and is headquartered in Yerevan.

== History and objectives ==
The Europe in Law Association was established on 31 January 2011. The ELA seeks to strengthen the core European values of liberty, human rights, the rule of law, democracy, and fundamental freedoms in Armenia. The ELA supports spreading these values among governmental bodies, local administrations, and in civil societies throughout the country. Lousineh Hakobyan serves as the current president of the ELA.

== Activities ==
In 2017, the ELA supported election monitoring in both parliamentary elections and Yerevan City Council elections.

The ELA supported the goals of the 2018 Armenian revolution and called for the elimination of corruption and for the government of Armenia to strengthen Armenia's democracy and judicial system.

In November 2019, the ELA announced support for the ratification of the Istanbul Convention. Hakobyan stated, "the staunchest critics of the Istanbul Convention are the representatives of the former regime and their supporters. They declare each and every step taken by the present authorities as the end, the apocalypse of the nation and the State and by doing this spread false information, including on the substance and the process of adoption of the Convention."

In March 2022, a roundtable discussion was held regarding the Russian invasion of Ukraine and how the European Union could assist Armenia, Georgia, and Moldova in maintaining their democracies and protecting them against Russian influence.

In September 2022, the ELA participated in the EU–Armenia Civil Society Platform. Members adopted a resolution supporting Armenia's closer relations and cooperation with the European Union, protecting free and fair elections, increasing government accountability and transparency, to implement International Labour Organization conventions, support free media and combat hostile propaganda aimed towards discrediting the EU and European values, and to support a peaceful resolution of the Nagorno-Karabakh conflict and achieve lasting peace in the South Caucasus region.

On 21 February 2023, the ELA and Council of Europe representatives organized a conference on supporting judicial reform in Armenia. Lousineh Hakobyan expressed hope for promoting judicial independence and increasing the effectiveness of legal proceedings. Hakobyan called for closer cooperation with the Council of Europe to support reforms and implement Venice Commission opinions.

On 3 March 2023, a meeting between the EU–Armenia Civil Society Platform and government of Armenia representatives was held in Yerevan. Lousineh Hakobyan was nominated as a Co-Chair. Hakobyan stressed the importance of implementing the Armenia–EU Comprehensive and Enhanced Partnership Agreement (CEPA). Members of the Confederation of Trade Unions of Armenia and Delegation of the European Union to Armenia, including the EU's ambassador to Armenia, Andrea Wiktorin, participated in the event. Hakobyan also held a meeting with the Deputy Prime Minister of Armenia Mher Grigoryan. The sides discussed the importance of civil society and involving the general public in the implementation of CEPA.

In March 2023, the Constitutional Court of Armenia declared that the Rome Statute was compliant with the Constitution of Armenia. The ELA released a statement supporting the National Assembly to ratify the Rome Statute which would allow Armenia to accede to the International Criminal Court.

In May 2023, the ELA participated in an anti-corruption coalition conference with the Armenian Association of Lawyers, the Anti-corruption Policy Council, the Union of Industrialists and Businessmen of Armenia, and the Eastern Partnership Civil Society Forum's Armenian National Platform. Former Minister of Justice Karen Karapetyan welcomed the initiative and supported the need to fight systemic corruption within government.

== See also ==
- Armenia in the Council of Europe
- Armenia–European Union relations
- Elections in Armenia
- Human rights in Armenia
- Law of Armenia
- Social issues in Armenia
