= We Alliance =

We Alliance Մենք դաշինք
- Leader: Aram Sargsyan; Khachatur Kokobelyan
- Founded: 10 November 2018
- Dissolved: 9 December 2018
- Headquarters: Yerevan
- Ideology: Liberalism; Pro-Europeanism; Pro-Western
- Political position: Centre
- Alliance of: Republic Party; Free Democrats

The We Alliance (Armenian: Մենք դաշինք, romanized: Menk’ dashink’) was a liberal political alliance of two political parties in Armenia: the Republic Party and the Free Democrats.

== History ==
The alliance was formed on 10 November 2018, leaders of both parties held a signing ceremony in Yerevan where a memorandum of cooperation was initialed. In addition, several members of the Armenian Dream party decided to join the We Alliance. The alliance participated in the 2018 Armenian parliamentary election, however they did not win any seats in the National Assembly. The alliance received 2.0% of the popular vote and had 133 candidates up for election across the country.

Despite the alliances loss, the leaders of both parties emphasized that the election was free and fair. Leaders also discussed the idea of both parties working together again in the future.

== Ideology ==
Both parties are considerably pro-European and have called for closer relations and integration between Armenia and the European Union. During the election campaign, the Free Democrats advocated that Armenia should withdraw its membership from the Eurasian Economic Union and pursue closer relations with the EU. The party also advocated for visa-free travel for Armenian citizens to the EU's Schengen Area. The Republic Party also campaigned on the platform that Armenia should withdraw from the Eurasian Union and the Collective Security Treaty Organization. The party supports Armenia's eventual accession to the EU, but stressed that it is not anti-Russian.

The alliance also supported the development of a Western style democracy, rule of law and a sustainable civil society in Armenia as well as developing a stronger liberal market economy.

== See also ==
- Politics of Armenia
- Programs of political parties in Armenia
