= Central Electoral Commission of Armenia =

Central Electoral Committee of Armenia
- Կենտրոնական ընտրական հանձնաժողով Kentronakan yntrakan handznazhogho

Agency overview
- Jurisdiction: Armenia
- Headquarters: Yerevan
- Agency executives: Tigran Mukuchyan, Chairman and President; Laura Galstyan, Deputy President
- Website: elections.am t.me/CentralElectoralComissionArmenia

The Central Electoral Commission of Armenia (CEC) (Armenian: Հայաստանի Կենտրոնական ընտրական հանձնաժողով) organizes elections and referendums in Armenia. The Commission oversees and regulates the electoral process, counts and publicizes results, among other duties. Before the formation of the Republic of Armenia in 1991, the Central Electoral Committee activities were carried out in accordance with Soviet Armenian laws set by the Election of People's Deputies. Electoral reforms were adopted in August 2011 concerning the organizing and conducting of presidential and regional elections in Armenia, three levels of electoral committees were established.

== Structure ==
Since June 2011, the Central Electoral Committee has 7 members, who are appointed by suggestions from the President of Armenia, Ombudsman, president of Appellate court and president of the control chamber. Members are assigned for six years with a few exceptions. Armenia is divided into 41 districts and 13 of them are located in the capital, Yerevan.

=== CEC President ===
The current President of the CEC is Tigran Mukuchyan.

- He supervises the ongoing process of work done by the committee
- He carries out authorial jobs stated by the code and regulations of the Republic of Armenia.
- His subordinates are the Deputy CEC President and the CEC President Secretary

=== Deputy CEC President ===
The current Deputy CEC President is Laura Galstyan

- She is responsible for the preparation of letters, applications, messages and other written formed documents constructed by the Head of the Committee
- She is also responsible for carrying out the recommendations and delegated tasks of the Head of the Committee

=== CEC Secretary ===
The current CEC Secretary is Armen Smbatyan

- He facilitates the regular activities of the CEC, including sessions, ensuring transparency, and accountability.
- He is responsible for the proper management and archiving of the electoral documents as per legislation.
- He coordinates the training and workshops conducted by the CEC for territorial electoral commissioners, observers, and other stakeholders.
- He is responsible for the partnership with international organizations (UNDP, IFES, Council of Europe, etc.).
- He coordinates the work of the CEC's Oversight and Audit Service.

=== Other members ===
- Georgi Martirosyan
- Silva Markosyan
- Nune Hovhannisyan
- Seyran Shahsuvaryan

== Formation ==
1. The Central Electoral Commission has seven members. The members of the Central Electoral Commission are appointed by the President of the Human Rights Defender, Chairman of the Court of Appeals of Armenia and the Chairman of the Chamber of Advocates of Armenia. The members of the Commission are appointed for a period of 6 years.

2. Three members of the Central Electoral Commission are appointed by the proposal of the Human Rights Defender, two by the proposal of the Chairman of the Court of Appeals, two by the proposal of the Chairman of the Chamber of Advocates. The members proposed by the Chairman of the Court of Appeals and the Chairman of the Chamber of Advocates must be representatives of different sexes and at least one out of the two members proposed by each Chairman should have an education or an academic degree in the field of law.

3. An Armenian citizen can be eligible to be selected as a member of the Central Electoral Commission who is not involved in social and political activities and has:

- a higher education in the field of law and 3 years of professional work experience in his field in at least the past 5 years
- an academic degree in law and 3 years of professional work experience in his field in at least the past 5 years
- a higher education and 5 years of work experience in the public services in the state bodies in at least the past 10 years, or
- a higher education and 3 years of work experience in the current electoral commission in at least the past 5 years.

4. The Head of the Central Electoral Commission, the Deputy Head of the Central Electoral Commission and the Secretary of the Central Electoral Commission should be elected by the Commission from among its members:

5. The details of the member candidates of the Central Electoral Commission are presented to the Staff of the President of the Republic not earlier than 30 days and not later than 20 days before the voting till 6 pm. The member candidates are informed about the day of the job expiry of the current commission member by the Head of the Central Electoral Commission not earlier than 50 days before the job expiry day.

6. The Decree of the President of the Republic about the appointment of the new members is published not later than 7 days before job expiry of the current member.

7. In case of an early job termination of a member of the Central Electoral Commission the vacant position is occupied in a period of 21 days. The new member should work in the commission for as long as the early terminated member did not work at the Commission. If this period is below 1 year then the new member gets to have the job for as long as it was supposed to be occupied plus 6 extra years.

8. The right to nominate candidates for the positions of the Head of the Central Electoral Commission, the Deputy Head of the Central Electoral Commission and the Secretary of the Central Electoral Commission belong to the members of the Central Electoral Commission.

9. The Head, The Deputy Head and The Secretary of the Central Electoral Commission should be elected by an open vote. If only one person has been selected as a candidate for the Head, Deputy Head or Secretary of the Central Electoral Commission then he should be elected if he receives the majority of the votes of the voters. If more than one person has been selected as a candidate for the Head, Deputy Head or Secretary of the Central Electoral Commission then the candidate to receive the majority of the votes gets elected. In case of a tie, the candidate gets selected by a draw.

== Obligations ==
1. The Central Electoral Commission is a public authority which organizes elections and controls their process. The Central Electoral Commission

- supervises the preparation and conduct of elections for the use of funds allocated from the state budget.
- adopts its rules of procedure and lower electoral commissions.
- organizes and carries out professional courses for the control process of the elections, sets the rules and regulations for the organization and the qualification of the courses.
- controls the implementation of the uniform application of The Electoral Code of the Republic of Armenia
- sets the ballots, voting records and other documents, their completion and maintenance of the electoral commissions with the necessary election documents.
- sets the required forms of the election ballots of the candidates, political parties
- makes decisions within its authority which are to be obliged throughout the country.
- eliminates invalid, void or invalidate commissions decisions contrary to the Electoral Code, except for the National Assembly elections, MP, mayor or council members elected to the district election commission decisions.
- listens to election commissions and state authorities in the preparation and conduct of elections.
- accreditation by the mass media, and observers.
- organizes the presidential candidates' biographic data.
- record the National Assembly deputies elected by proportional representation, deputies to the National Assembly Deputy;
- appoints Armenia's National Assembly and call for new elections.
- makes decisions set by the Electoral Code and makes decisions about electoral process which do not collude with the Electoral Code.
- during all national elections, publishes a training manual for precinct election commission members, proxies and observers.
- sets out the procedure for drawing the electoral commissions.
- approve the sample ballot box (dimensions).
- exercise control over the financial activities of political parties.
- may be required by law to establish institutions.
- perform other duties prescribed by the Electoral Code.

2. Within 3 months of the publication of the results of national elections, the Head of the Central Electoral Commission or a member appointed by him comes to the National Assembly with a message about the election process, analyses of Electoral Code violations and legislative amendments to the Electoral Code. This message is posted on the Central Electoral Commission web site. 3. The Central Election Commission may be appealed to the Government of the Republic of Armenia, to improve the electoral law amendments.

== Committee ==
1. Local electoral committee is in charge of defining the three members of local electoral commission who will sign all the sheets with the names of electors and the election ballots as well with the draw that takes place the day before the elections.
2. The president and the secretary of local electoral committee are not participating in a draw that defines the distribution of functions among the members of the Commission.
3. By the reserved authorization of the Constitution of the Republic of Armenia and the Code of laws the committee is in charge of ensuring the realization of its duties according to the Constitution and the Code of laws.
4. The committee should organize and manage the whole process of the elections, preparation and the calculation of the ballots.
5. The committee should manage and spend the budgeted money for the preparation and the process of elections.
6. The committee should research, observe and promulgate the decisions made by the committee.
7. The committee should provide the necessary documents concerned to the organizing and processing elections.
8. The structure of the committee is based on the structural departments and divisions and sub departments as well.
9. The committee is run by the president and the vice president of the committee
10. The head of the committee is the president of the commission

== See also ==
- Elections in Armenia
- Government of Armenia
- Politics of Armenia
