= Crime in Armenia =

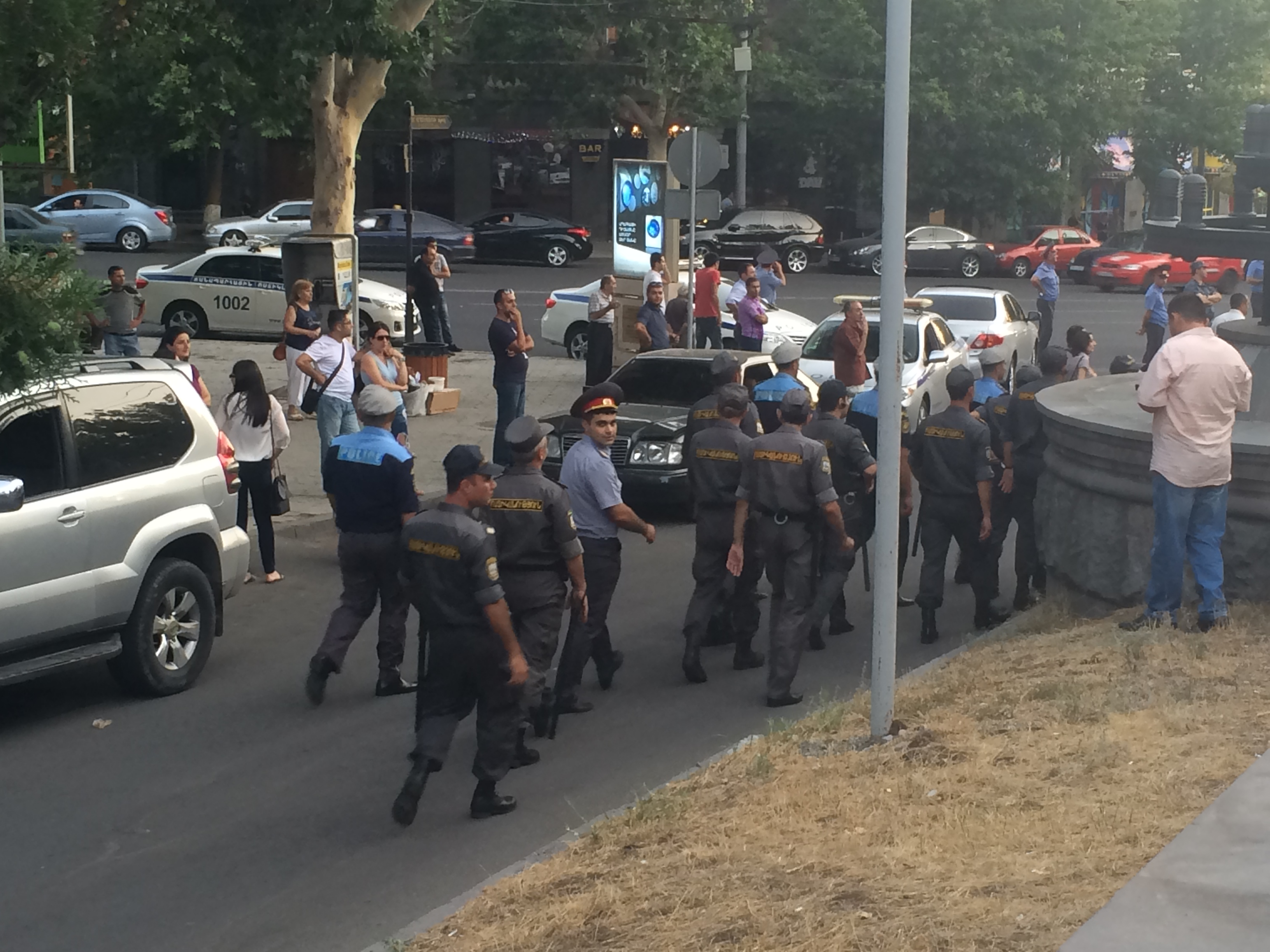
Armenian police in the capital Yerevan.

Crime in Armenia is multi-dimensional. It includes murder, tax evasion, corruption, extortion, money laundering, police brutality, organized crime, and clan or gang violence.

In 2017, there were 20,284 criminal cases registered in Armenia, an increase from 18,764 in 2016. the number went up again in 2018, reaching 22,551 cases, marking an 11.2% increase from 2017.

In 2018, Armenia had been classified as one of the safest countries in the world for travelers. The United States Department of State has classified Armenia as a safe country for tourists, giving Armenia the highest safety rating in the Caucasus region.

== Crime by type ==
=== Murder ===
In 2012, Armenia had a murder rate of 1.8 per 100,000 population. There were a total of 54 murders in Armenia in 2012.

In 2017, there were 49 cases of murder in Armenia (about 1.6 per 100,000 population), down from 66 in 2016. A total of 409 persons died because of various criminal cases (down from 424 in 2016), including 202 cases of death because of crime leading to road accidents.

In 2018, with 38 cases, Armenia recorded the lowest murder rate in 38–40 years.

=== Organized crime ===
Organized crime permeates the Armenian economy. In Yerevan, there are organized, criminal clans known as "akhperutyuns" (Armenian: ախբերություն, or brotherhoods). They assert their power through their position and connections. The various factions sometimes battle for rights over their "turf". Members are guided by the underworld laws brought from Russian prisons.

=== Corruption ===
In 2017, 634 corruption related criminal cases were registered, which led to criminal prosecutions of 376 persons.

The United Nations Development Programme in Armenia views corruption in Armenia as "a serious challenge to its development".

=== Domestic violence ===
A 2008 study by Amnesty International stated that more than a quarter of women in Armenia "have faced physical violence at the hands of husbands or other family members." Since reporting domestic violence is heavily stigmatized in Armenian society, many of these women have no choice but to remain in abusive situations.

In January 2018, Armenia signed the Council of Europe Convention on Preventing and Combating Violence Against Women and Domestic Violence. Armenia has also signed the Convention on the Elimination of All Forms of Discrimination Against Women.

=== Environmental protection ===
In 2017, there were 885 cases of breaches of legislation on environmental protection, leading to total 3346 million AMD compensation demands.

In 2018, the Government of Armenia and the European Union launched a joint action plan to develop and implement policies which will ensure a high level of environmental protection in Armenia.

== By location ==
In 2017, there were 10219 criminal cases registered in Yerevan, representing about half of all 20284 criminal cases in Armenia.

== See also ==
- Armenian mafia
- Human rights in Armenia
- Judiciary of Armenia
- Law of Armenia
