= Declaration of State Sovereignty of Armenia =

Declaration signed in 1990 in Yerevan, Armenia

The Declaration of State Sovereignty of Armenia was signed by Armenia's president Levon Ter-Petrossian and Supreme Council of Armenia secretary Ara Sahakian on August 23, 1990 in Yerevan, Armenia. The Republic of Armenia was established on September 21, 1991 upon dissolution of the Soviet Union. The declaration was rooted in the December 1, 1989, joint decision of the Armenian SSR Supreme Council and the Artsakh National Council on the "Reunification of the Armenian SSR and the Mountainous Region of Karabakh" with ties to the Republic of Armenia established on May 28, 1918 and the Declaration of Independence of Armenia (1918).

The statement include 12 declarations including the establishment of a right of return for the Armenian diaspora. It renames Armenian SSR to the Republic of Armenia and establishes that the state have a flag, coat of arms, and national anthem. It also states the nation's independence with its own currency, military, and banking system. The declaration guarantees free speech, press, and a division of governance between a judiciary, legislature and presidency. It calls for a multiparty democracy. It establishes the Armenian language as official. It also supports "recognition of the 1915 Genocide in Ottoman Turkey and Western Armenia". It served as the "basis for the development" for the Constitution of Armenia.

The 1990 declaration was preceded by the Declaration of Independence of Armenia (1918), before Armenia was invaded and became part of the Soviet Union.

== See also ==
- History of Armenia
- Politics of Armenia
