= Judiciary of Armenia =

Overview of Armenia's judiciary system

The judicial hierarchy of Armenia

The Judiciary of Armenia interprets and applies the laws of Armenia. Under the doctrine of the separation of powers, judiciary exercises judicial power separately from the legislative power of Parliament and executive power of the Prime Minister. Per the Constitution, it is defined with a hierarchical structure regulated by the Supreme Judicial Council of Armenia. On the other hand, the Ministry of Justice of Armenia (Armenian: Հայաստանի արդարադատության նախարարություն) is a government agency which possesses executive authority and executes policies of the Government of Armenia in sectors that are closely associated with laws and regulations.

== Judiciary of Armenia ==
Supreme Judicial Council emblem

Based on article 7 of the Constitution of Armenia, judiciary in Armenia is exercised only by the courts through a three-tier judicial system, with the guarantor of its unrestricted implementation being the Supreme Judicial Council.

=== Constitutional Court of Armenia ===
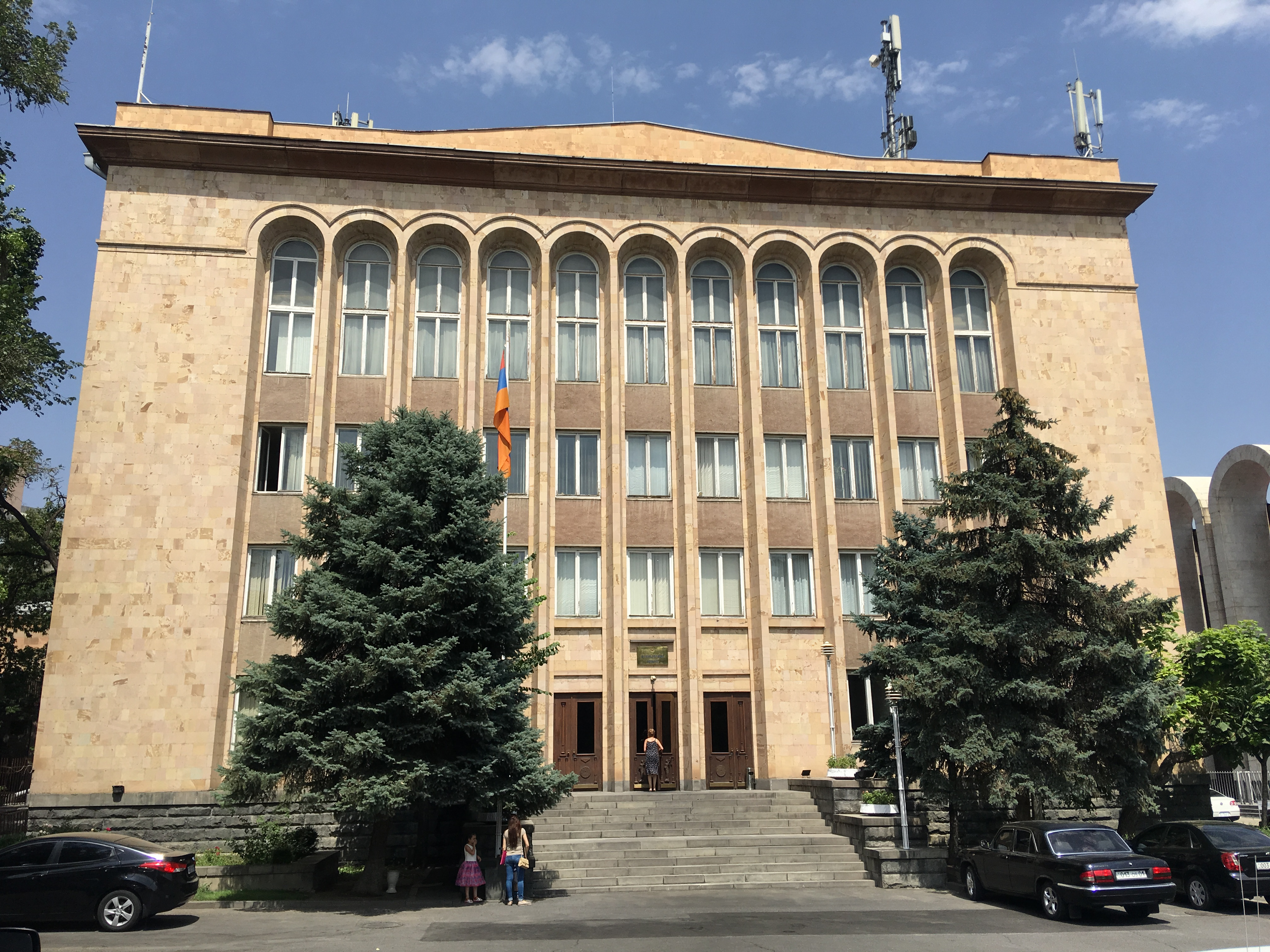
The Constitutional Court of Armenia

In its turn, the Constitutional Court of Armenia (Armenian: Հայաստանի սահմանադրական դատարան) is the highest legal body for constitutional review in Armenia. It is a judicial body which is separate and independent from the executive, the legislative and the judiciary. It is responsible for supervising the constitutionality of laws and other legislative instruments. The law of constitutional court of Armenia is defined both in Armenian constitution and in law.

== Courts ==
The Supreme Judicial Council of Armenia (Armenian: Հայաստանի բարձրագույն դատական խորհուրդ) is the guarantor of the unrestricted implementation of the judicial system. It consists of five distinguished members elected by the National Assembly, as well as five experienced judges elected by the general assembly of judges who forms the representative body of the judiciary.

=== Court of Cassation ===
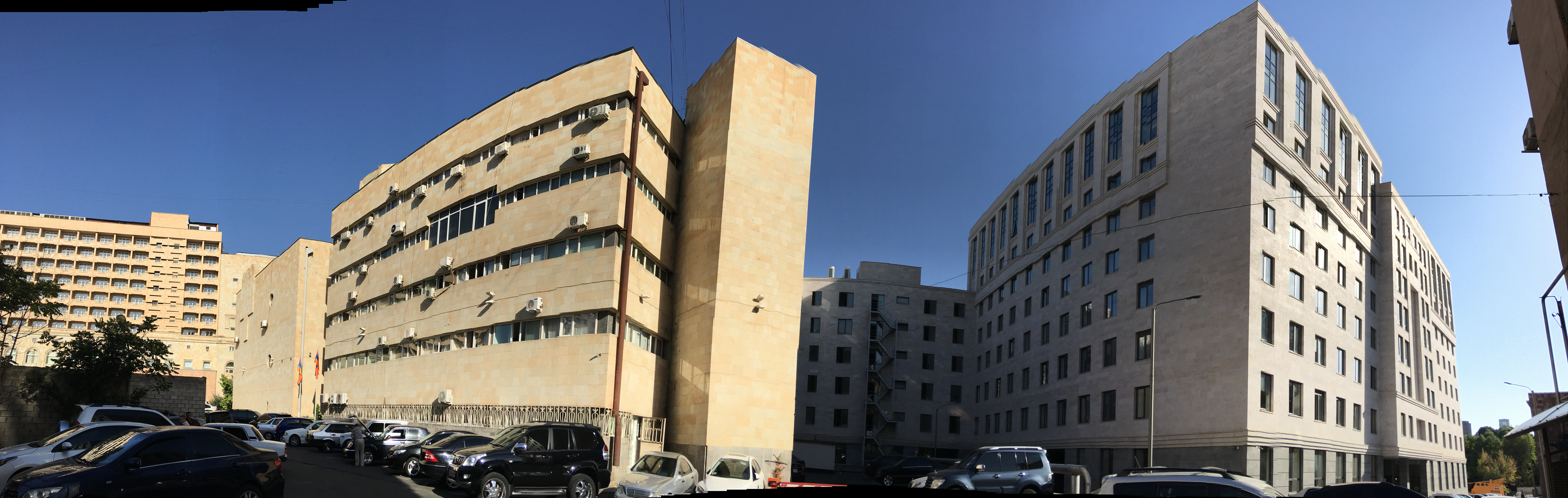
The Court of Cassation

The Court of Cassation of Armenia (Armenian: Հայաստանի վճռաբեկ դատարան) is based in the capital Yerevan and their jurisdiction covers the entire territory of the republic.

=== Appellate Court ===
Known as the Court of Appeals of Armenia (Armenian: Հայաստանի վերաքննիչ դատարան), including three types: Civil Court of Appeal (Armenian: Վերաքննիչ քաղաքացիական դատարան), Criminal Court of Appeal (Armenian: Վերաքննիչ քրեական դատարան), and Administrative Court of Appeal (Armenian: Վերաքննիչ վարաչական դատարան). The courts are based in the capital Yerevan and their jurisdiction covers the entire territory of the republic.

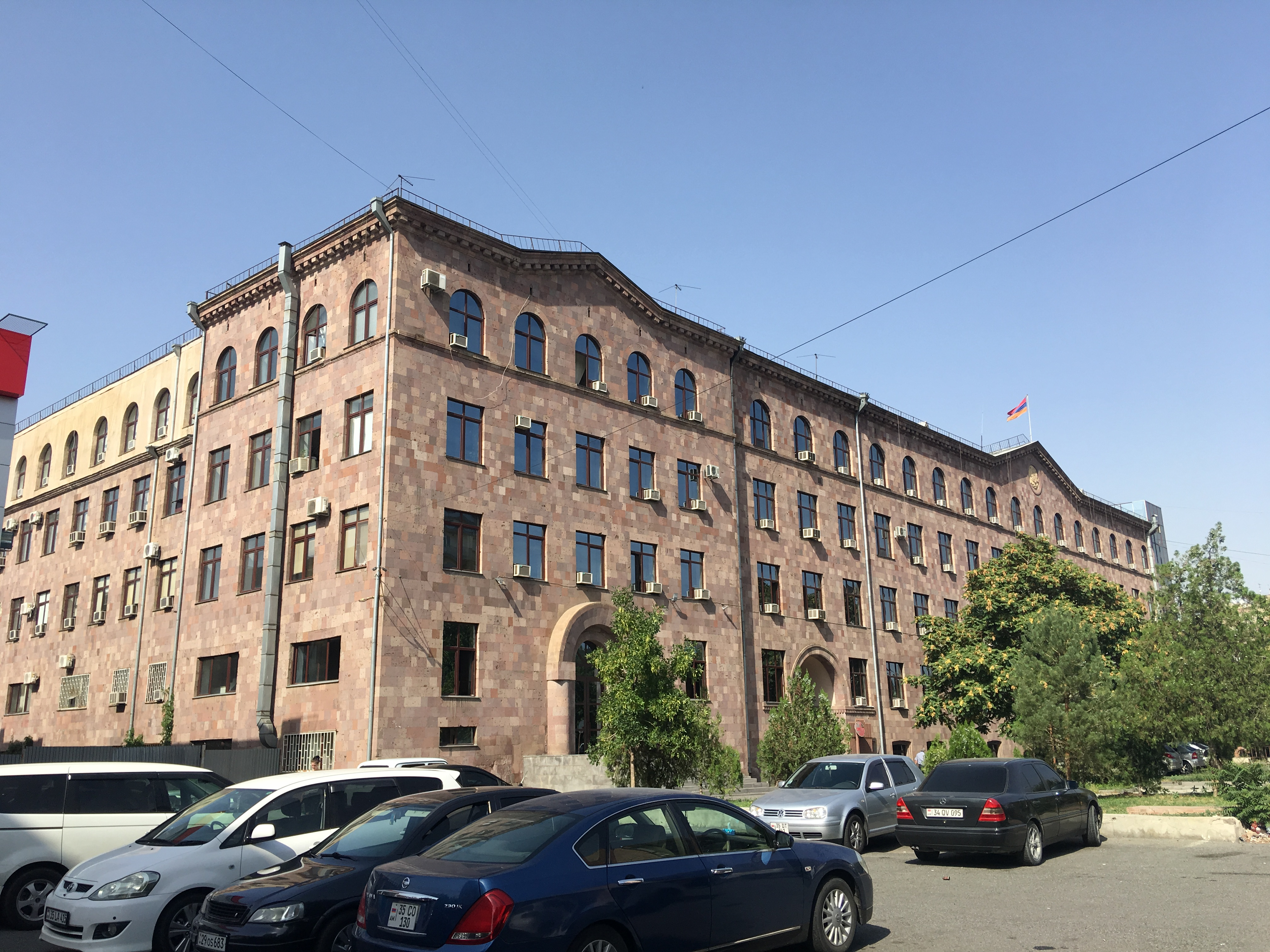
Civil Court of Appeal

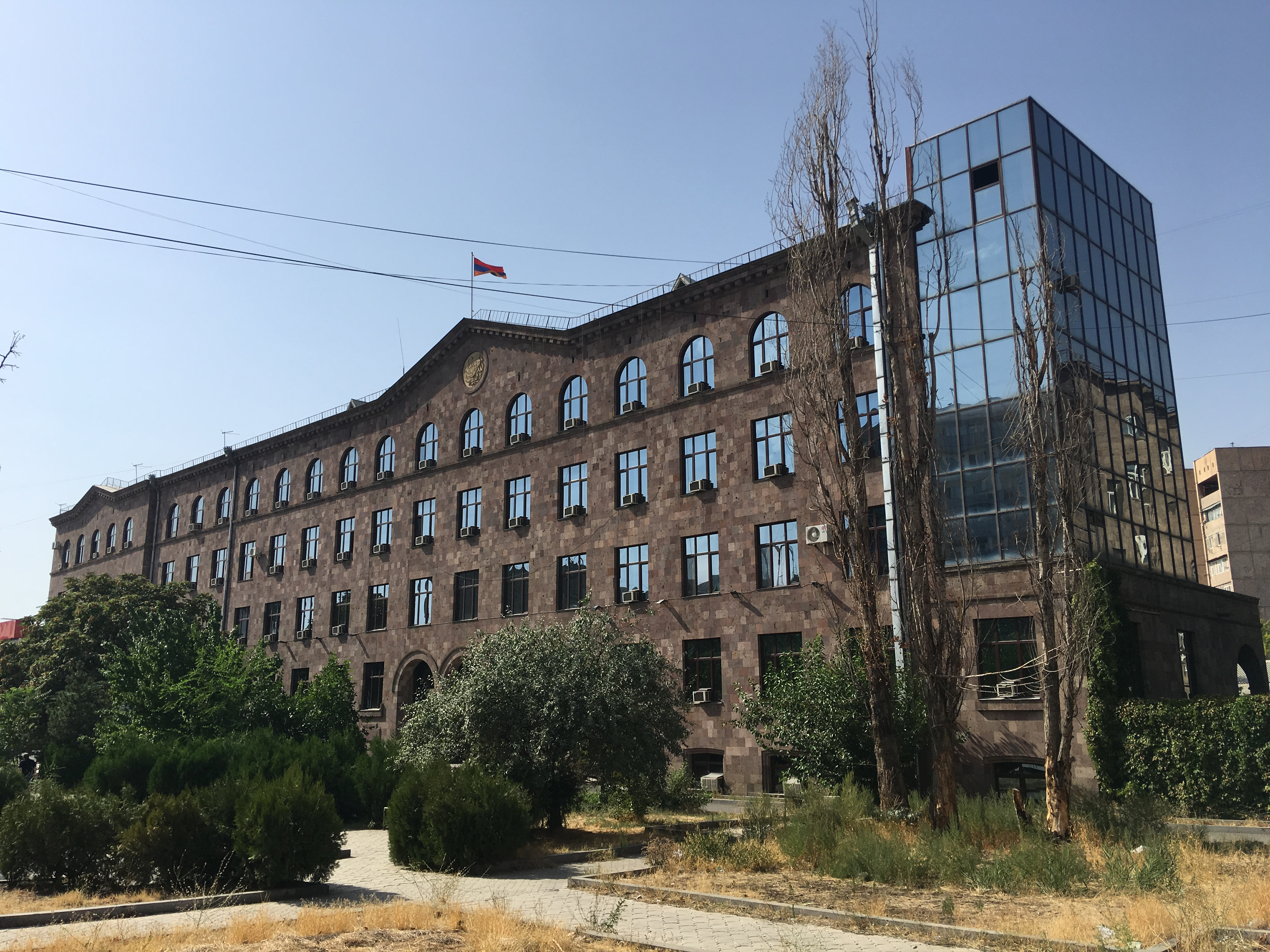
Criminal Court of Appeal

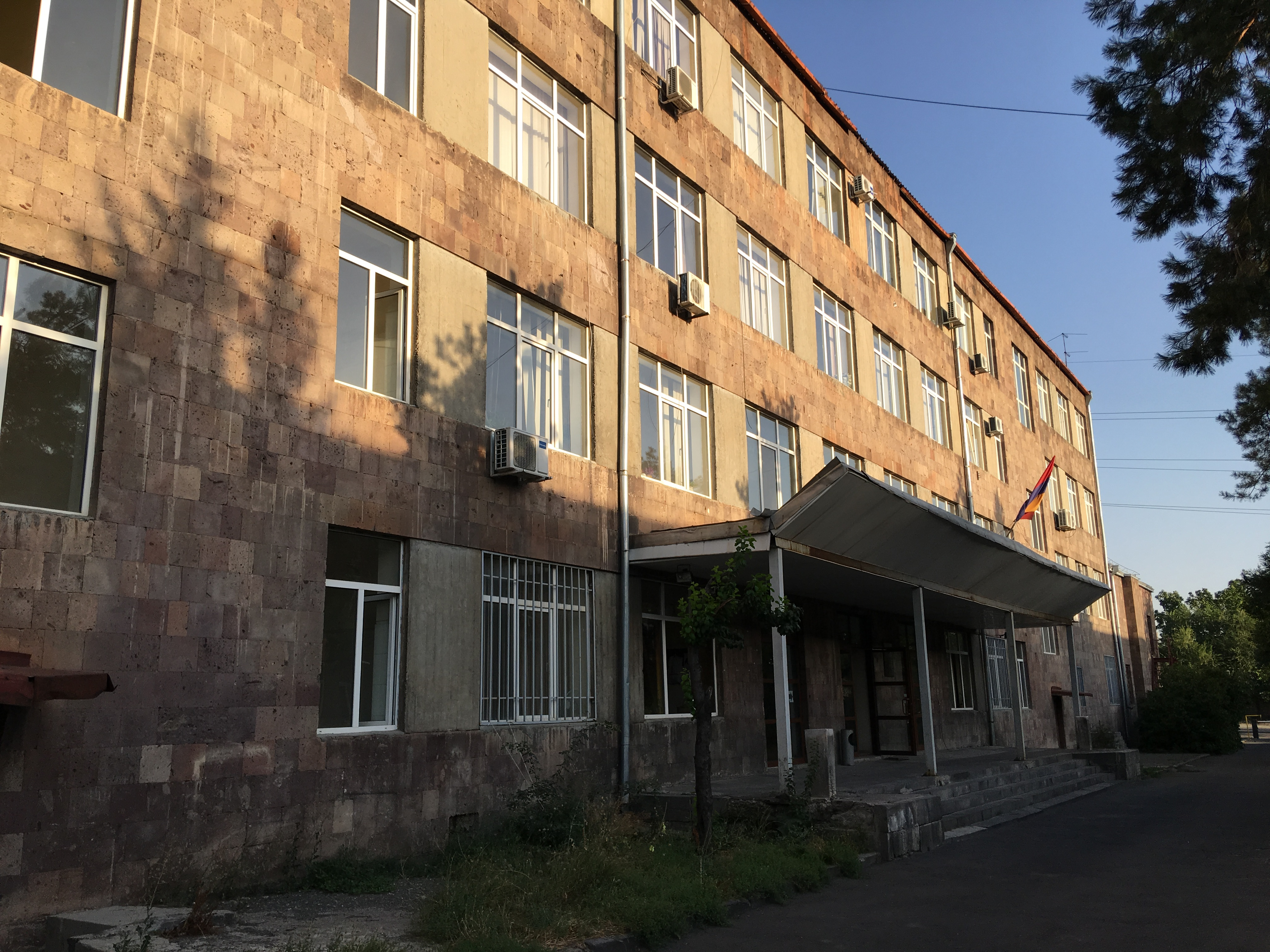
Administrative Court of Appeal

=== Trial courts ===
Known as the Courts of First Instance of General Jurisdiction of Armenia (Armenian: Հայաստանի առաջին ատյանի ընդհանուր իրավասության դատարաններ). Currently, there are 8 courts covering the 12 districts of the capital Yerevan, and 9 courts throughout the other 10 provinces of Armenia; one for each province, with the exception of Ararat and Vayots Dzor provinces which are directed by a single court based in Ararat province.

=== Specialized courts ===
Additionally, there are two types of Specialized Courts (Armenian: Մասնագիտացված դատարաններ) based in the capital Yerevan: Administrative court (Armenian: Վարչական դատարան), and Bankruptcy court (Armenian: Սնանկության դատարան).

== See also ==
- Europe in Law Association
- Legal system of Armenia
- Politics of Armenia
- Prosecutor General of Armenia
