= Politics of Armenia =

Political System of Armenia Հայաստանի պետական համակարգ
- Coat of arms of Armenia
- Polity type: Unitary parliamentary republic
- Constitution: Constitution of Armenia

Legislative branch
- Name: National Assembly
- Type: Unicameral
- Meeting place: National Assembly Building
- Presiding officer: Alen Simonyan, President of the National Assembly

Executive branch
- Head of state
- Title: President
- Currently: Vahagn Khachaturyan
- Appointer: National Assembly
- Head of government
- Title: Prime Minister
- Currently: Nikol Pashinyan
- Appointer: President
- Cabinet
- Name: Government of Armenia
- Current cabinet: Pashinyan government
- Leader: Prime Minister
- Appointer: President
- Headquarters: Government House
- Ministries: 12

Judicial branch
- Name: Judiciary of Armenia
- Constitutional Court of Armenia
- Chief judge: Arman Dilanyan
- Seat: Yerevan

The politics of Armenia take place in the framework of the parliamentary representative democratic republic of Armenia, whereby the president of Armenia is the head of state and the prime minister of Armenia the head of government, and of a multi-party system. Executive power is exercised by the president and the Government. Legislative power is vested in both the Government and Parliament.

== History ==
Armenia became independent from the Russian Empire on 28 May 1918 as the Republic of Armenia, later referred as First Republic of Armenia. About a month before its independence Armenia was part of short lived Transcaucasian Democratic Federative Republic. Suffering heavy losses during the Turkish invasion of Armenia and after the Soviet invasion of Armenia, the government of the First Republic resigned on 2 December 1920. Soviet Russia reinstalled its control over the country, which later became part of the Transcaucasian SFSR. The TSFSR was dissolved in 1936 and Armenia became a constituent republic of the Soviet Union known as the Armenian SSR, later also referred as the Second Republic of Armenia.

During the dissolution of the Soviet Union the population of Armenia voted overwhelmingly for independence following the 1991 Armenian independence referendum. It was followed by a presidential election in October 1991 that gave 83% of the votes to Levon Ter-Petrosyan. Earlier in 1990, when the National Democratic Union party defeated the Armenian Communist Party, he was elected Chairman of the Supreme Council of Armenia. Ter-Petrosyan was re-elected in 1996. Following public discontent and demonstrations against his policies on Nagorno-Karabakh, the President resigned in January 1998 and was replaced by Prime Minister Robert Kocharyan, who was elected as second President in March 1998. Following the assassination of Prime Minister Vazgen Sargsyan, parliament Speaker Karen Demirchyan and six other officials during parliament seating on 27 October 1999, a period of political instability ensued during which an opposition headed by elements of the former Armenian National Movement government attempted unsuccessfully to force Kocharyan to resign. In May 2000, Andranik Margaryan replaced Aram Sargsyan (a brother of assassinated Vazgen Sargsyan) as prime minister.

Kocharyan's re-election as president in 2003 was followed by widespread allegations of ballot-rigging. He went on to propose controversial constitutional amendments on the role of parliament. These were rejected in a referendum the following May. Concurrent parliamentary elections left Kocharyan's party in a very powerful position in the parliament. There were mounting calls for the President's resignation in early 2004 with thousands of demonstrators taking to the streets in support of demands for a referendum of confidence in him.

The Government of Armenia's stated aim is to build a Western-style parliamentary democracy. However, international observers have questioned the fairness of Armenia's parliamentary and presidential elections and constitutional referendum between 1995 and 2018, citing polling deficiencies, lack of cooperation by the Electoral Commission, and poor maintenance of electoral lists and polling places. Armenia is considered one of the most democratic nations of the Commonwealth of Independent States and the most democratic in the Caucasus region.

The observance of human rights in Armenia is uneven and is marked by shortcomings. Police brutality allegedly still goes largely unreported, while observers note that defendants are often beaten to extract confessions and are denied visits from relatives and lawyers. Public demonstrations usually take place without government interference, though one rally in November 2000 by an opposition party was followed by the arrest and imprisonment for a month of its organizer. Freedom of religion is not always protected under existing law. Nontraditional churches, especially the Jehovah's Witnesses, have been subjected to harassment, sometimes violently. All churches apart from the Armenian Apostolic Church must register with the government, and proselytizing was forbidden by law, though since 1997 the government has pursued more moderate policies. The government's policy toward conscientious objection is in transition, as part of Armenia's accession to the Council of Europe.

Armenia boasts a good record on the protection of national minorities, for whose representatives (Assyrians, Kurds, Russians and Yazidis) four seats are reserved in the National Assembly. The government does not restrict internal or international travel.

=== Transition to a parliamentary republic ===
In December 2015, the country held a referendum which approved transformation of Armenia from a semi-presidential to a parliamentary republic.

As a result, the president was stripped of his veto faculty and the presidency was downgraded to a figurehead position elected by parliament every seven years. The president is not allowed to be a member of any political party and re-election is forbidden.

Skeptics saw the constitutional reform as an attempt of third president Serzh Sargsyan to remain in control by becoming Prime Minister after fulfilling his second presidential term in 2018.

In March 2018, the Armenian parliament elected Armen Sarkissian as the new President of Armenia. The controversial constitutional reform to reduce presidential power was implemented, while the authority of the prime minister was strengthened. In May 2018, parliament elected opposition leader Nikol Pashinyan as the new prime minister. His predecessor Serzh Sargsyan resigned two weeks earlier following widespread anti-government demonstrations.

In June 2021, early parliamentary elections were held. Nikol Pashinyan's Civil Contract party won 71 seats, while 29 went to the Armenia Alliance headed by former President Robert Kocharyan. The I Have Honor Alliance, which formed around another former president, Serzh Sargsyan, won seven seats. After the election, Armenia's acting prime minister Nikol Pashinyan was officially appointed to the post of prime minister by the country's president Armen Sarkissian. In January 2022, Armenian President Armen Sarkissian resigned from office, stating that the constitution does no longer give the president sufficient powers or influence. On 3 March 2022, Vahagn Khachaturyan was elected as the fifth president of Armenia in the second round of parliamentary vote. In June 2024, Armenia suspended its membership in the CSTO, and in February 2025, it ratified its accession bill for EU membership.

== Government ==
Main office-holders
Office	Name	Party	Since
President	Vahagn Khachaturyan	Independent	13 March 2022
Prime Minister	Nikol Pashinyan	Civil Contract	8 May 2018

== Legislative branch ==
The unicameral National Assembly of Armenia (Azgayin Zhoghov) is the legislative branch of the government of Armenia.

Before the 2015 Armenian constitutional referendum, it was initially made of 131 members, elected for five-year terms: 41 members in single-seat constituencies and 90 by proportional representation. The proportional-representation seats in the National Assembly are assigned on a party-list basis among those parties that receive at least 5% of the total of the number of the votes.

Following the 2015 referendum, the number of MPs was reduced from the original 131 members to 101 and single-seat constituencies were removed.

== Political parties and elections ==
As of January 2025, there are 123 political parties registered in Armenia. The electoral threshold is currently set at 5% for single parties and 7% for blocs.

== Independent agencies ==
Independent of three traditional branches are the following independent agencies, each with separate powers and responsibilities:

- the Constitutional Court of Armenia
- the Central Electoral Commission of Armenia
- the Human Rights Defender of Armenia
- the Central Bank of Armenia
- the Prosecutor General of Armenia
- the Audit Chamber of Armenia

== Corruption ==
Transparency International's 2024 Corruption Perceptions Index ranked Armenia 60th out of 180 in the world with 47 points. This has pushed the country up from being ranked at 60th in 2020 and 58th in 2021. According to Transparency International, Armenia has improved significantly on the Corruption Perception Index since 2012, especially since the 2018 revolution, the country has taken steps to counter corruption. Further mentioning that "Armenia has taken a gradual approach to reform, resulting in steady and positive improvements in anti-corruption. However, safeguarding judicial independence and ensuring checks and balances remain critical first steps in its anti-corruption efforts. The effectiveness of those efforts is additionally challenged by the current political and economic crisis as a result of the recent Nagorno Karabakh conflict and the subsequent protests against Prime Minister Nikol Pashinyan over a ceasefire deal".

In 2008, Transparency International reduced its Corruption Perceptions Index for Armenia from 3.0 in 2007 to 2.9 out of 10 (a lower score means more perceived corruption); Armenia slipped from 99th place in 2007 to 109th out of 180 countries surveyed (on a par with Argentina, Belize, Moldova, Solomon Islands, and Vanuatu).

== See also ==
- Constitution of Armenia
- Constitutional economics
- Elections in Armenia
- Foreign relations of Armenia
- List of political parties in Armenia
- Politics of Artsakh
- Programs of political parties in Armenia
- Rule according to higher law
