= Aghvan Hovsepyan =

Armenian jurist and politician

Aghvan Garniki Hovsepyan (Armenian: Աղվան Գառնիկի Հովսեփյան; born January 7, 1953) is an Armenian jurist and politician who served two terms as Prosecutor General of Armenia, first from 1998 to 1999 and again from 2004 to 2013. From 2014 to 2018, he served as head of the Investigative Committee of Armenia. He also served secretary of the Prosecutor General from 1999 to 2004.

Hovsepyan belonged to the editorial board of the journal Preliminary Investigation.

On September 7, 2021, Hovsepyan was arrested on several corruption charges, including the laundering of 1.3 billion Armenian dram and stealing property worth 800 million dram.
