= Free Democrats (Armenia) =

Free Democrats Ազատ դեմոկրատներ
- Leader: Khachatur Kokobelyan
- Founded: May 22, 2011
- Headquarters: Yerevan
- Ideology: Liberalism; Pro-Europeanism; Pro-Western; Anti-EAEU
- Political position: Centre
- National affiliation: We Alliance (2018)
- Slogan: "We can"
- National Assembly: 0 / 107

Website
- http://www.fdp.am/

Free Democrats (Armenian: Ազատ դեմոկրատներ, romanized: Azat demokratner) is an Armenian liberal, Pro-European political party.

== History ==
The Free Democrats were founded in 2011 by Khachatur Kokobelyan, a former deputy chairman of the Armenian National Movement (ANM). The party's creation was described as the most serious split within the Armenian National Congress (ANC) camp since Levon Ter-Petrosyan returned to politics in 2007. Kokobelyan attributed the departure of party members from the ANC to strategic and organizational problems, and argued that the ANC was not genuinely liberal. Shortly after its founding, U.S. Ambassador Marie Yovanovitch visited the party's office and met with its leadership.

In the 2012 Armenian parliamentary election, the Free Democrats ran on a joint ticket with the Heritage Party led by Raffi Hovannisian, with party members included on Heritage's list. Kokobelyan rejected claims that the party was foreign-funded, stating that it relied on members' savings and supporters' contributions, and ruled out any coalition with the ruling authorities. Although Heritage held that Turkey must recognize the Armenian genocide before relations could be established, Kokobelyan said both parties supported establishing diplomatic relations with Turkey without preconditions. Heritage won 5.78% of the vote.

The party participated in the 2017 Armenian parliamentary election, however the party won just 0.94% of the vote, failing to win any political representation. Khachatur Kokobelyan headed the party list, while Hrant Bagratyan (former Prime Minister of Armenia and leader of the Freedom Party) was the candidate for the post of Prime Minister.

Prior to the 2018 Armenian parliamentary election, the Free Democrats formed a political alliance known as the We Alliance with the Hanrapetutyun Party, another pro-Western and pro-European party in Armenia. During the election campaign, the Free Democrats advocated that Armenia should withdraw its membership from the Eurasian Union and pursue closer relations with the European Union. The party also advocated for visa-free travel for Armenian citizens to the EU's Schengen Area. The Alliance received 2.00% of the votes. As this was lower than the 5% minimum threshold required, the We Alliance of Hanrapetutyn and Free Democrats failed to gain any representation in the National Assembly.

In November 2019, the party hosted American Ambassador to Armenia Lynne M. Tracy at the parties headquarters in Yerevan, where a range of issues were discussed.

On 21 April 2021, the Free Democrats had confirmed it would participate in the 2021 Armenian parliamentary elections. However, the party ultimately did not register to participate. Currently, the party acts as an extra-parliamentary force.

== Ideology ==
The Free Democrats believe in establishing a more democratic Armenia, including developing a stronger civil society, a liberal market economy, greater protection of the environment and integrating Armenia into the European Union. The party firmly believes that Armenia's future is connected with Europe.

Party leader Khachatur Kokobelyan, had previously submitted a draft resolution calling for Armenia's Eurasian Economic Union membership to be terminated. Kokobelyan stated that, "After joining the Eurasian Union, Armenia has faced greater problems, for example, in its relations with the EU, than it has received dividends. I am confident that we do not need this organization. After leaving it, Armenia will have alternatives."

In addition, the Free Democrats believe in strengthening Armenia's democracy, promoting human rights and equality, the rule of law and support for civil society. In terms of economics, the party advocates for a strong liberal market economy and believes that by following the European path of development and standards, Armenia will achieve greater prosperity and security.

== See also ==
- Liberalism in Armenia
- Programs of political parties in Armenia
