= Constitution of Armenia =

Supreme law of Armenia

The Constitution of Armenia was adopted by a nationwide Armenian referendum on July 5, 1995. This constitution established Armenia as a democratic, sovereign, social, and constitutional state. Yerevan is defined as the state's capital. Power is vested in its citizens, who exercise it directly through the election of government representatives. Decisions related to changes in constitutional status or to an alteration of borders are subject to a vote of the citizens of Armenia exercised in a referendum. There are 117 articles in the 1995 constitution. On November 27, 2005, a nationwide constitutional referendum was held and an amended constitution was adopted. The constitution was amended again in a national referendum on December 6, 2015 that changed the political structure from a semi-presidential system to a parliamentary republic.

According to the November 2005 Constitution, the president of the Republic appoints the prime minister based on the distribution of the seats in the National Assembly and consultations with the parliamentary factions. The President also appoints (or dismisses from office) the members of the Government upon the recommendation of the Prime Minister.

== Early constitutional history and drafting of the 1995 constitution ==
Immediately after independence, the 1978 constitution, a replica of the Soviet Union's 1977 document, remained in effect except in cases where specific legislation superseded it. At the end of 1992, the president and the APM parliamentary delegates presented a draft constitution. They put forward a revised version in March 1993. Then, after nearly a year's work, a bloc of six opposition parties led by the Armenian Revolutionary Federation (ARF) presented an alternative constitution in January 1994 that would expand the parliament's power, limit that of the president, expand the authority of local government, allow Armenians everywhere to participate in governing the republic, and seek international recognition of the 1915 Genocide. As 1994 began, observers expected a long struggle before parliament adopted a final version.

== Structure of the constitution ==
The Constitution of Armenia consists of a preamble (preface) and 9 chapters. The Preamble sets out the general principles and aims of the constitution (the Armenian people, based on the fundamental principles and national goals of Armenian statehood enshrined in the Declaration of Independence of Armenia, carrying out the sacred aspiration of the restoration of its sovereign state, dedicated to the strengthening of the homeland, prosperity, civic solidarity, affirming adherence to universal values, adopts the Constitution of the Republic of Armenia). The Preamble is also important from a legal point of view in that it refers to the Declaration on Independence of Armenia, adopted on August 23, 1990, thus raising the principles and goals of the Armenian statehood to a constitutional-legal level. This 1990 declaration cites the 1989 unification act by the legislative bodies of the Armenian Soviet Socialist Republic and the Nagorno-Karabakh Autonomous Oblast. It also calls for the recognition of the Armenian genocide.

=== Chapter 1: The Basis of the Constitutional Order. ===
This chapter defines the nature of the state (sovereign, democratic, social, legal state), the power of the people, the state's restriction on human rights and freedoms, the supreme legal force of the constitution with all other legal acts, its immediate effect, the principle of separation and balance of powers, political, the basics of economic and social systems, the separation of the church from the state, the status of the armed forces, administrative-territorial organization of the state, the official language, state symbols and capital.

=== Chapter 2. Human Rights and Citizens' Basic Rights and Freedoms. ===
The Fundamental human and civil rights and freedom rights, enshrined in accordance with internationally recognized norms. Human and citizen rights and freedom rights are divided into personal, political, citizen and socio-economic rights. This chapter also sets out the specific duties of the individual and citizen, namely the duty of each person to pay taxes in a manner and amount prescribed by law, to make other obligatory payments, to uphold the Constitution and the laws, to respect the rights, freedom, and dignity of others, as well as duty of each citizen to participate in the defense of the Republic of Armenia in the manner prescribed by law.

=== Chapter 3: The President of the Republic. ===
Defines the status of the president of the Republic, his / her power, the procedure of election and the terms of office, the requirements for a candidate for president. The elections of the president of the Republic, the National Assembly, the local self-government bodies, as well as the referendum, shall be held by universal, equal and direct suffrage by secret ballot.

=== Chapter 4: Parliament. ===
Defines the status, power, procedure of elections of the legislature, the status of deputies and the procedure of election, and the legislative process.

=== Chapter 5: Government. ===
It defines the powers and procedures of the executive power - the government.

=== Chapter 6. Judicial Power. ===
It defines the structure of the judicial system, the procedure of its formation, the procedure and powers of the formation of the Constitutional Court, as well as the powers of the Prosecutor's Office of the Republic of Armenia, which is separate from the judiciary, and the procedure for appointing the Prosecutor General.

=== Chapter 7. Local Self-Government. ===
Guarantees local self-government to communities, the community's right and authority to resolve issues of local importance in accordance with the Constitution and laws to secure the well-being of its residents. Local self-governing bodies are defined as the head of the community and the council, their powers, the basis of financing the communities, and the government's control over the communities.

=== Chapter 8. Adoption, Amendment and Referendum of the Constitution. ===
States that the Constitution shall be adopted and amended only by referendum, which shall be set by the President of the Republic upon the recommendation or consent of the National Assembly. Laws may also be adopted by referendum, which are subject to later amendment by referendum. Also defines the bases for a referendum.

=== Chapter 9. Concluding and Transitional Provisions. ===
Defines the transitional provisions related to constitutional amendments.

== Main provisions of the constitution ==
The 117 articles of the Constitution are divided into nine chapters. Chapters 2-5 concern Fundamental Rights and Freedoms (chapter 2), the president of the Republic (chapter 3), the National Assembly (chapter 4), the Government (chapter 5), and the Judicial Power (chapter 6). Their main provisions are summarized here.

=== President of the Republic ===
The President of Armenia (Armenian: Հայաստանի Նախագահ, Hayastani Nakhagah) is the head of state and the guarantor of independence and territorial integrity of Armenia elected to a single seven-year term by the National Assembly of Armenia. Under Armenia's parliamentary system, the President is simply a figurehead and holds ceremonial duties, with most of the political power vested in the Parliament and prime minister.

=== Prime minister ===
The Prime Minister of Armenia is the head of government and most senior minister within the Armenian government, and is required by the constitution to "determine the main directions of policy of the Government, manage the activities of the Government and coordinate the work of the members of the Government." Also -according to the constitution-, the Prime Minister heads the Security Council, which prescribes the main directions of the country's defense policy; thus, the Prime Minister is effectively the commander-in-chief of the Armed Forces of Armenia.

Under the 2015 constitution, the Prime Minister is the most powerful and influential person in Armenian politics. The Prime Minister is appointed by the President of Armenia upon the vote of the National Assembly. The Prime Minister can be removed by a vote of no confidence in Parliament. In the constitutional referendum held in 2015, citizens voted in favor of transferring Armenia into a parliamentary republic.

=== National Assembly ===
The National Assembly of Armenia (Armenian: Հայաստանի Հանրապետության Ազգային ժողով, Hayastani Hanrapetyut'yan Azgayin zhoghov or simply Ազգային ժողով, ԱԺ Azgayin Zhoghov, AZh), also informally referred to as the Parliament of Armenia (խորհրդարան, khorhrdaran) is the legislative branch of the government of Armenia.

=== Government ===
The Government of Armenia (Armenian: Հայաստանի Հանրապետության Կառավարություն) is the executive branch of the government in Armenia. It is an executive council of government ministers headed by the Prime Minister of Armenia.

=== Judicial Power ===
The Judiciary of Armenia interprets and applies the law of Armenia. Under the doctrine of the separation of powers, judiciary exercises judicial power separately from the legislative power of parliament and executive power of the prime minister. As per the Constitution, it is defined with a hierarchical structure headed by the Supreme Judicial Council.

Based on article 7 of the Constitution of the Republic of Armenia, judiciary in Armenia is exercised only by the courts through a three-tier judicial system, with the guarantor of its unrestricted implementation being the Supreme Judicial Council.

=== Minorities ===
The Constitution sets aside four seats in Parliament for ethnic minorities, one each for Russians, Yezidis, Assyrians and Kurds, respectively.

== See also ==
- Armenian National Constitution
- Constitutional economics
- Constitutionalism
- Europe in Law Association
- Media of Armenia
- Politics of Armenia
- Prosecutor General of Armenia
- Social issues in Armenia
