= 1995 Armenian constitutional referendum =

5 July 1995

Results
Choice	Votes	%
Yes	828,370	70.31%
No	349,721	29.69%
Valid votes	1,178,091	96.76%
Invalid or blank votes	39,440	3.24%
Total votes	1,217,531	100.00%
Registered voters/turnout	2,189,804	55.6%

A constitutional referendum was held in Armenia on 5 July 1995. The changes to the constitution were approved by 70.3% of voters, with a turnout of 55.6%.

== Results ==
Choice	Votes	%
For	828,370	70.3
Against	349,721	29.7
Invalid/blank votes	39,440	–
Total	1,217,531	100
Registered voters/turnout	2,189,804	55.6
Source: Nohlen et al.
