= Constitutional Court of Armenia =

Highest legal body for constitutional review in Armenia

- Հայաստանի Հանրապետության սահմանադրական դատարան
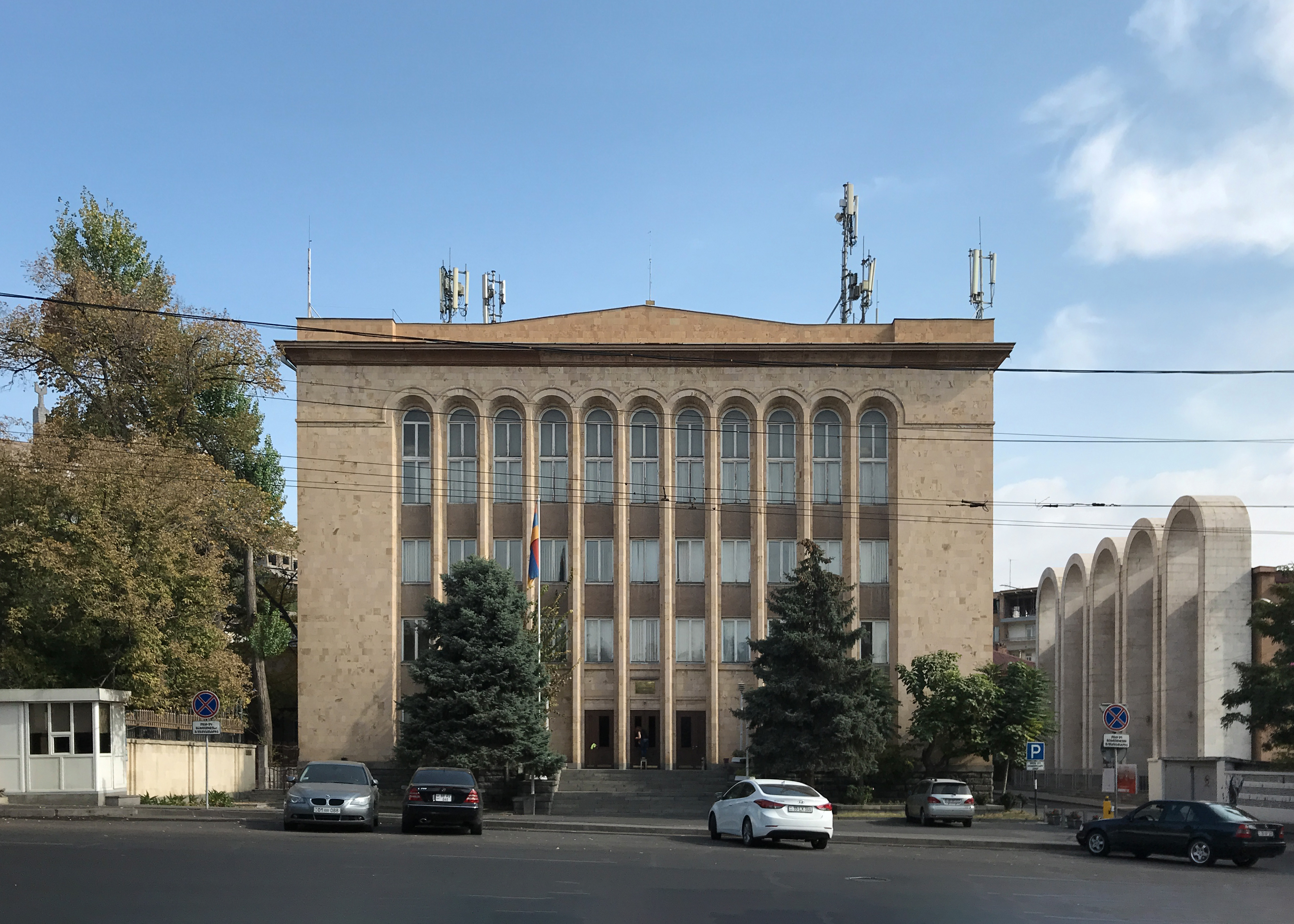
- Interactive map of Constitutional Court of Armenia
- Established: 1995
- Location: 10 Baghramyan Avenue, Yerevan
- Composition method: Elected/appointed by the National Assembly with an equal number of nominations by the president, the government and a general meeting of judges
- Authorised by: Constitution of Armenia
- Judge term length: Twelve years, non-renewable
- Number of positions: Nine, including the president
- Website: Official website

President
- Currently: Arman Dilanyan
- Since: 12 October 2020

The Constitutional Court of Armenia (Armenian: Հայաստանի Հանրապետության սահմանադրական դատարան, romanized: Hayastani Hanrapetut'yan sahmanadrakan dataran) is the highest legal body for constitutional review in Armenia. It is responsible for supervising the constitutionality of laws and other legislative instruments. The law of the constitutional court is defined in the Armenian constitution and by statute. The court, established in 1995, is located in Yerevan.

== History ==
In December 1988, a constitutional control committee was set up in accordance with an amendment to the Constitution of the Soviet Union. The Armenian legislature considered setting up a Constitutional Court in 1991; two laws, the 1 October 1991 Law on the President of the Republic and the 19 November 1991 Law on the Supreme Council of the Republic of Armenia, alluded to such a court.

The new Armenian constitution, approved by referendum on 5 July 1995, established the court. The Law on the Constitutional Court was adopted by the Armenian National Assembly on 20 November 1995 and was signed by President Levon Ter-Petrosyan on 6 December of that year. On 5 and 6 February 1996, the members of the court were appointed; it began operating on 6 February, when its members were sworn in before the National Assembly.

In 2005, Armenia enacted constitutional reforms. On 27 November of that year, the text of the RA Constitution (with amendments addressing the system of constitutional justice) was adopted by referendum. According to article 93 of the constitution, "The Constitutional Court shall administer constitutional justice in the Republic of Armenia." According to article 94, "The powers, the procedures of formation and activities of the courts shall be defined by the Constitution and laws." As a result of the amendments, the court's authority was substantially expanded.

== Membership ==
The court is made up of nine members, and membership is open to any Armenian citizen aged 35 or over. According to Article 166 of the Armenian Constitution, members of the court may remain in office until age 70. The National Assembly and the president may appoint members of the court. Five members are elected by the National Assembly, on the recommendation of its chair; the other four members are appointed by the president.

The president of the Constitutional Court is not elected by its membership, but is appointed by the National Assembly after a nomination by the assembly chair. If the National Assembly fails to appoint the president of the Constitutional Court within 30 days of a vacancy, the president of Armenia must do so.

The requirements for court membership are: • Armenian citizenship, age 35, no citizenship of another country • Higher legal-education qualifications or an academic degree in constitutional law, and 10 years of legal experience • Command of the Armenian language

Members of the court may not be engaged in entrepreneurial activity, hold any office in state or local self-government bodies not related to their duties, hold any position in a commercial organization or engage in any other paid occupation, except for scientific, educational and creative work not hindering them from fulfilling the duties of court membership.

Members of the court cease to discharge their functions when they 1) reach age 65, 2) die, 3) lose their citizenship or are granted foreign citizenship, 4) resign in writing to their appointing body and the court, 5) are determined by a court to be unable to work, missing or dead, 6) have been convicted of a crime, or 7) are appointed in violation of the constitution.

Members of the court must be dismissed if they 1) were absent three times within one year from court sessions without an excuse 2) have been unable to fulfill their powers for six months due to a temporary disability or other lawful reason, 4) express an opinion in advance on a case being reviewed or otherwise raise suspicions about their impartiality, or 5) are affected by disease or illness which prevents them from fulfilling their duties.

== Powers ==
The court shall, in conformity with procedures defined by law:

1. Determine compliance of the laws, resolutions of the National Assembly, decrees and orders of the president, decisions of the prime minister and local governing bodies with the constitution
2. Determine compliance of international treaties with the constitution before ratification
3. Resolve disputes arising from the outcomes of referendums
  3.1 Resolve disputes arising from decisions adopted concerning the election of the president and deputies
4. Declare insurmountable or eliminated obstacles to a candidate for president
5. Rule on the existence of grounds for impeaching the president
6. Rule on the incapacity by the president to discharge his or her responsibilities
7. Rule on terminating the power of a member of the constitutional court, detaining him or her, agreeing to accuse him or her or instituting a court proceeding to subject him or her to administrative liability
8. Rule on the grounds to discharge the head of community
9. In cases prescribed by the law, rule on suspending or prohibiting the activities of a political party

== International relations ==
In 1996, the court became a member of the Council of Europe's European Commission for Democracy through Law (otherwise known as the Venice Commission). The court is also a member of the European Court of Human Rights' Superior Courts Network, the World Conference on Constitutional Justice, and the Association of Francophone Constitutional Courts.

Armenia signed the Rome Statute in 1999, but has not yet ratified the treaty. On 29 December 2022, the government of Armenia announced it was beginning the process of ratifying the Rome Statute, which would allow Armenia to accede to the International Criminal Court. According to Justice Minister Grigor Minasyan, Armenia would declare that the Rome Statute would apply to Armenia retroactively from 12 May 2021. On 1 September 2023, prime minister Nikol Pashinyan's administration sent the Rome Statute to the National Assembly for ratification.

On 22 February 2023, the court participated in the European Union and Council of Europe's Partnership for Good Governance conference in Yerevan. The stated aim of the conference is to encourage the implementation of judicial reform in Armenia, strengthen the independence of the judiciary, and align legal practices to European standards. The conference was attended by government representatives, civil society, and delegates from the European Council. President of the Constitutional Court Vahe Grigoryan stated, "the Council of Europe is considered as a key partner of the long-term reform program of the Constitutional Court."

== Legal profession ==
According to a report requested by the OSCE's Office for Democratic Institutions and Human Rights for the Workshop on Reform of the Legal Profession, the 2004 Law of the Republic of Armenia requires bar admission for attorneys to practice law; before then, there was no nationwide bar. In 1998, after the passage of the first law on advocacy, three bar associations were created: the Union of Advocates of the Republic of Armenia (succeeding the Collegium of Advocates), the International Bar Union, and the International Union of Armenian Advocates. The International Bar Union and the International Union of Armenian Advocates merged into one organization, and the unified Chamber of Advocates was founded in 2005.

== See also ==
- Constitution of Armenia
- Court of Cassation of Armenia
- Europe in Law Association
- Judiciary of Armenia
- Law of Armenia
- Member states of the Venice Commission
- Prosecutor General of Armenia
- States parties to the Rome Statute of the International Criminal Court
