= Corruption in Armenia =

Corruption in Armenia has decreased significantly in modern times, but remains an ongoing problem in the country. Despite this, fighting corruption following the 2018 Armenian revolution has recorded significant progress. Armenia is a member of the Council of Europe's Group of States Against Corruption (GRECO) and the OECD's Anti-Corruption Network and Armenia's anti-corruption measures are regularly evaluated within their monitoring mechanisms.

== Progress since 2018 ==
In 2025, Armenia ranked 65th out of 182 countries in the Corruption Perceptions Index (CPI), scoring 46 on a scale from 0 ("highly corrupt") to 100 ("very clean"). A rank of 180 (and a low score) is a country that is perceived to be highly corrupted and a rank of 1 (and a high score) is a country perceived to be corruption-free. Worldwide, the best score was 89 (ranked 1), the average score was 42, and the worst score was 9 (ranked 181, in a two-way tie). Thus, Armenia scored roughly in the middle in the 2025 CPI. Regionally, the best score among Eastern European and Central Asian countries (Note: Albania, Armenia, Azerbaijan, Belarus, Bosnia and Herzegovina, Georgia, Kazakhstan, Kosovo, Kyrgyzstan, Moldova, Montenegro, North Macedonia, Russia, Serbia, Tajikistan, Turkey, Turkmenistan, Ukraine, Uzbekistan) was 50, the average score was 34 and the worst score was 17.

Armenia recorded significant progress in fighting corruption between 2018 and 2020, improving its CPI score from 35 to 49 and its rank from 105th to 60th. Its CPI score increase of 7 points between 2019 and 2020 was the second-best improvement worldwide. In a comparison conducted in 2020, Armenia (ranked in 60th place in the 2020 CPI) was perceived to be less corrupt than three of its neighboring countries, Azerbaijan (ranked 129th), Iran (149th) and Turkey (86th). Armenia's fourth neighbor, Georgia, was ranked 45th in the 2020 CPI.

The European Union and Armenia ratified the Armenia-EU Comprehensive and Enhanced Partnership Agreement in March 2021. The agreement includes provisions to fight organized crime and corruption, protect human rights, and further develop democracy in the country.

== Anti-corruption strategy ==
Since 22 January 2001, the Government of Armenia has aimed to reach minimum corruption in the country by developing an anti-corruption strategy, while developing an implementation plan along with a Steering Committee. Armenia put large emphasis on the fight against corruption, ensuring the participation of various NGOs, governmental and non-governmental actors, and other institutions in the act of anti-corruption promotion. To reach the goal of eliminating corruption, the government focuses on:

1. The creation of a fair public administration system based on the rule of law.
2. The detection and investigation of the act of corruption and proper liability.
3. Raise awareness about the reasons and negative causes of corruption.
4. Disallowance of abuse from officials to an individual.
5. Enforcement of special laws against corruption.

The program sets priorities in the fight against corruption, which are raising public awareness of the danger posed to society by corruption and its consequences; preventing corruption and ensuring the rule of law in order to protect the rights and legitimate interests of individuals.

== Earlier developments ==
According to Transparency International's 2014 report, entrenched corruption, strong patronage networks, a lack of clear separation between private enterprise and public office, as well as, the overlap between political and business elites in Armenia render the implementation of anti-corruption efforts relatively inefficient and feed a pervasive political apathy and cynicism on the part of citizens, who do not see an impactful role for themselves in the fight against corruption.

In 2006, the United Nations Development Programme in Armenia stated that corruption in Armenia is "a serious challenge to its development." The selective and non-transparent application of tax, customs and regulatory rules, as well as weak enforcement of court decisions fuels opportunities for corruption. The Armenian procurement system is characterized by instances of unfair tender processes and preferential treatment. Relationship between high-ranking government officials and the emerging private business sector encourage influence peddling. The government has reportedly failed to fund implementation of the anti-corruption strategy and devoted no money and little commitment for anti-corruption efforts.

The main anti-corruption institutions of the Armenian government are an Anti-Corruption Council – headed by the prime minister – and the Anti-Corruption Strategy Monitoring Commission, established in June 2004 to strengthen the implementation of anticorruption policy. However, these institutions scarcely functioned in 2006-2007, even though they were supposed to meet twice-quarterly and monthly, respectively. Furthermore, the Armenian Anti-Corruption Council was accused of lavish spending and has largely failed to investigate or prosecute senior officials.

The late Prime Minister Andranik Margarian, launched Armenia's first post-Soviet campaign against corruption in 2003. The initiative, however, has been widely disparaged for being short on results. Former Prime Minister Tigran Sargsyan, has acknowledged that corruption is Armenia's "number one problem that obstructs all our reforms."

The government has launched an anti-graft campaign which has been accompanied by changes in customs regulations, reported tax police inspections of companies owned by pro-government businesspeople and numerous high-profile firings of people in the tax department, customs service and police. The recent crackdown on corruption has received mixed reactions.

== Areas ==
=== Mining ===
Regulation of mineral industry carries multiple corruption risks, as it was highlighted by international research.

=== Education ===
Despite the success of the authorities in reducing petty corruption/bribery in some citizen-government interactions, anti-corruption watchdogs report that entrenched corruption, strong patronage networks, a lack of clear separation between private enterprise and public office, as well as, the overlap between political and business elites limit the effective implementation of anti-corruption efforts. These problems affect the education system too. It is perceived as one of the sectors that is hit hardest by corruption. Attempts to fight the problem have brought mixed results and often opened new opportunities for malpractice instead of closing the existing ones.

=== Tax and customs agencies ===
In 2007, World Bank economists pointed to serious problems with rule of law and widespread corruption in the Armenian Tax Service and the Armenian Customs Service.

=== Misappropriation of international loans ===
In March 2004, an ad hoc commission of the National Assembly, investigating the use of a $30 million World Bank loan concluded that mismanagement and corruption among government officials and private firms was the reason of the failure of the program to upgrade Yerevan's battered water infrastructure. The World Bank issued the loan in 1999 in order to improve Yerevan residents' access to drinking water. The government promised to ensure around-the-clock water supplies to the vast majority of households by 2004, but as of 2008, most city residents continue to have running water for only a few hours a day.

Veolia Environnement, the French utility giant that took over Yerevan's loss-making water and sewerage network in 2006, has said that it will need a decade to end water rationing. In August 2007, Bruce Tasker, a Yerevan-based British engineer who had participated in the parliamentary inquiry as an expert, publicly implicated not only Armenian officials and businessmen but also World Bank representatives in Yerevan in the alleged misuse of the loan. In a 4 October 2007 news conference, the World Bank Yerevan office head Aristomene Varoudakis denied the allegations, claiming that the World Bank disclosed fully all information available on the project to the parliamentary commission and that based on this information, there was no evidence of fraud or mismanagement in the project.

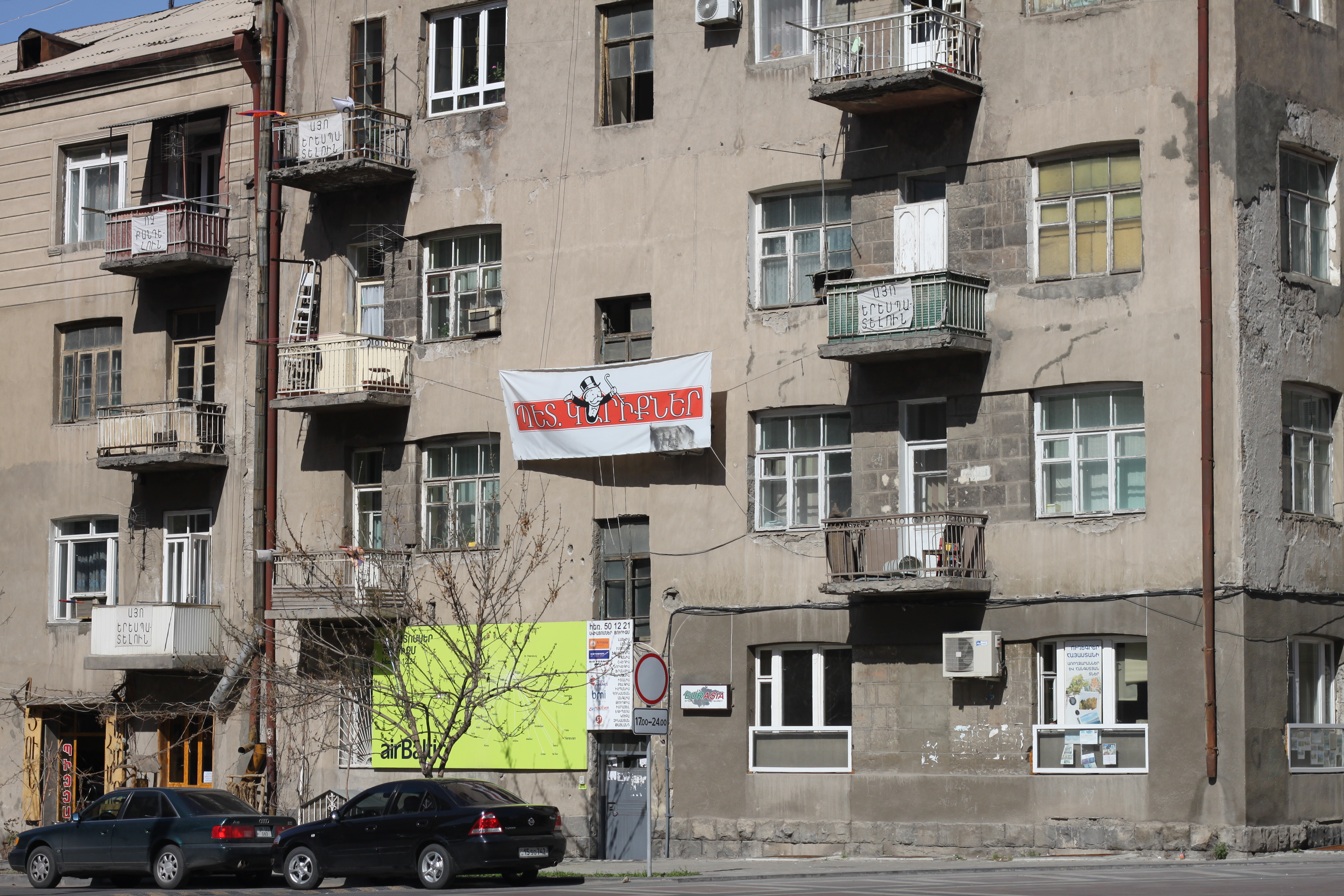
Northern Avenue residents protest the proposed demolition of their building through signs and posters, 2011.

=== Illegitimate use of eminent domain ===
Eminent domain laws have been used to forcefully remove residents, business owners, and land owners from their property. The projects that are built on these sites are not of state interest, but rather are privately owned by the same authorities who have executed the eminent domain clause. A prominent example is the development of Yerevan's Northern Avenue area. Another involves an ongoing project (as of November 2008) to construct a trade center near Yerevan's botanical garden. The new land owners were Yerevan's former mayor Yervand Zakharyan and Deputy Mayor Karen Davtyan, who was at one time Director of the Armenian Development Agency and successfully executed the eviction of residents on Northern Avenue.

== See also ==
- Armenian mafia
- Crime in Armenia
- Europe in Law Association
- Group of States Against Corruption
- International Anti-Corruption Academy
- International Anti-Corruption Day
- ISO 37001 Anti-bribery management systems
- OECD Anti-Bribery Convention
- Transparency International
- United Nations Convention against Corruption
