= 2018 Armenian Revolution =

Protests that led to Prime Minister Serzh Sargsyan's resignation

2018 Armenian Revolution (Velvet Revolution)
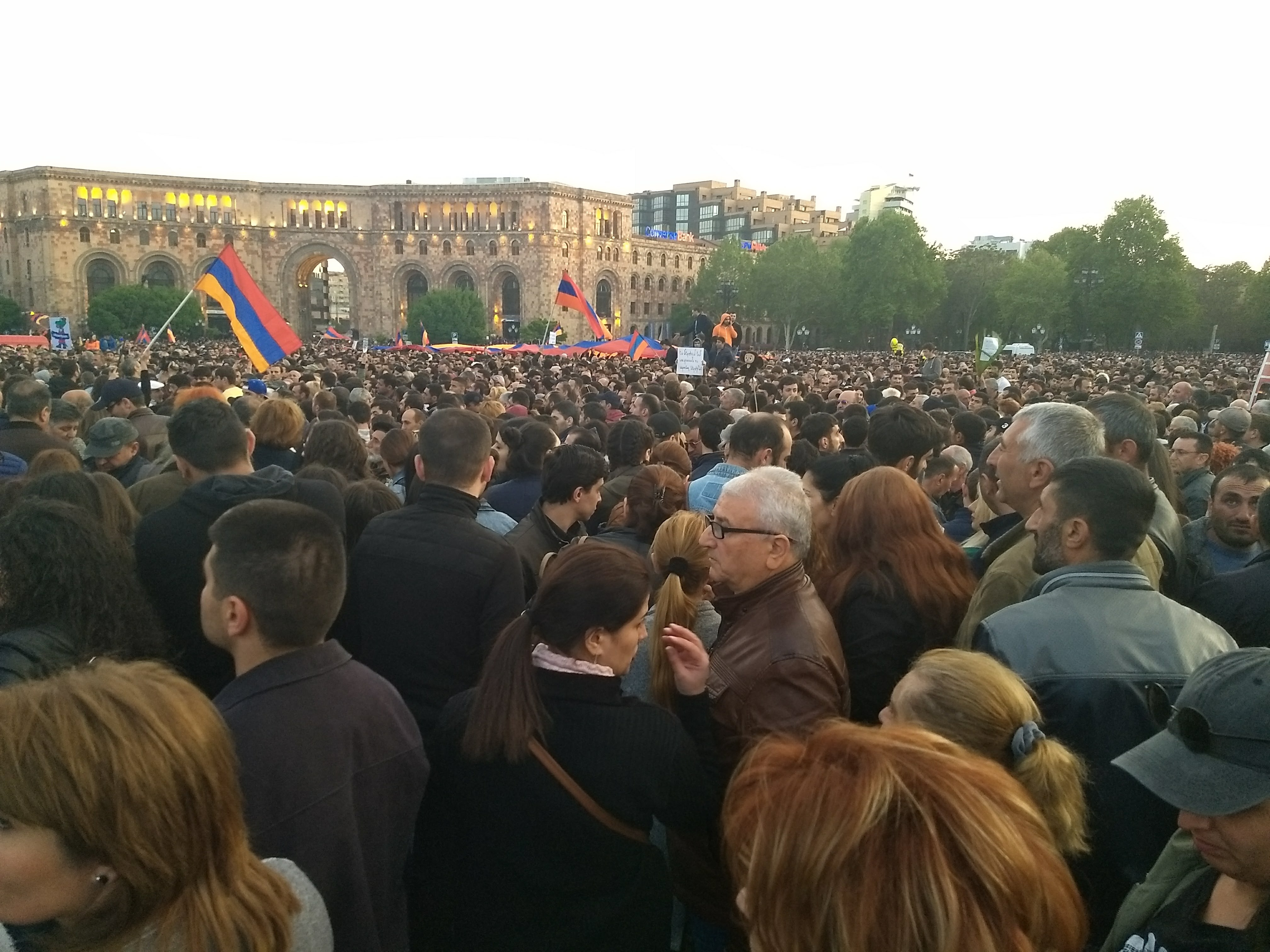
- Protest in Republic Square, Yerevan, 22 April 2018
- Date: 31 March – 8 May 2018 (1 month, 1 week and 1 day)
- Location: Armenia; Armenian diaspora: Los Angeles, Glendale, California, Moscow, Milan, Marseille, Toronto, Montreal, Sochi, Brussels, Vancouver, Athens, London, Berlin, Buenos Aires, Chicago, São Paulo
- Caused by: Re-election of Serzh Sargsyan as the Prime Minister; Detention of opposition leaders
- Goals: Originally: Resignation of Serzh Sargsyan as PM Later added: Snap elections to the National Assembly; Removal of the Republican Party from power; Appointment of Pashinyan as interim prime minister until snap elections are held
- Methods: Demonstrations, sit-ins, student protest, civil disobedience, online activism, boycotts of business, general strike
- Result: Protesters victory: Resignation of Serzh Sargsyan; Republican Party decided to not put forward candidate in votes for new Prime Minister on 1 and 8 May; Election of Nikol Pashinyan as the Prime Minister

Parties
Political opposition: Civil Contract; Supported by: Way Out Alliance; Sasna Tsrer Pan-Armenian Party; Armenian National Congress; Free Democrats; National Democratic Pole; Prosperous Armenia (since 23 April); Armenian Revolutionary Federation (since 28 April); Non-political groups: 12th Peacekeeping Brigade (23 April)	Armenian government: Police; National Security Service; Organized crime and oligarchs; Political parties: Republican Party of Armenia; Armenian Revolutionary Federation (until 25 April)

Lead figures
Nikol Pashinyan MP (detained from 22 to 23 April)	Serzh Sargsyan (ex-president, resigned Prime Minister); Karen Karapetyan (ex-prime Minister, acting Prime minister)

Number
Yerevan: 250,000 (1 May); 200,000 (23 April); 150,000 (2 May); 115,000 (22 April); Gyumri: 10,000 (27 April); Glendale, California: 5,000	

Casualties and losses
40 injured including Nikol Pashinyan	6 policemen injured (on 16 April)

The 2018 Armenian Revolution, most commonly known in Armenia as #MerzhirSerzhin (Armenian: #ՄերժիրՍերժին, lit. '#RejectSerzh'), was a series of anti-government protests in Armenia from April to May 2018 staged by various political and civil groups led by a member of the Armenian parliament – Nikol Pashinyan (head of the Civil Contract party). Protests and marches took place initially in response to Serzh Sargsyan's third consecutive term as the most powerful figure in the government of Armenia, later broadening against the ruling Republican Party, who were in power since 1999. Pashinyan declared it a Velvet Revolution (Թավշյա հեղափոխություն, T'avshya heghap'vokhut'yun).

On April 22, Pashinyan was arrested and held in solitary confinement overnight, then released on April 23, the same day that Sargsyan resigned, saying "I was wrong, while Nikol Pashinyan was right". The event is referred to by some as a peaceful revolution akin to revolutions in other post-Soviet states. By the evening of April 25, the Republican Party's coalition partner, the Armenian Revolutionary Federation, had withdrawn from the coalition.

By April 28, all of the opposition parties in Armenia's parliament had announced they would support Pashinyan's candidacy. A vote was scheduled in the National Assembly for May 1; for Pashinyan to be elected prime minister, which required 53 votes, he would have had to win the votes of at least six members of the Republican Party. Pashinyan was the only candidate who was put forward for the vote. However, the Republican Party unanimously voted against Pashinyan – 102 MPs were present, out of which 56 voted against his candidacy and 45 voted for it. One week later, on May 8, the second vote took place. Pashinyan was elected prime minister with 59 votes.

The revolution was seen as an opportunity for Armenia to realign its foreign policy in the European direction. The revolution contradicted Russian policy, as it opposed the notion of the irreplaceability of post-Soviet leaders and posed a threat to authoritarianism in the post-Soviet space. The revolution in Armenia was deemed "European" in nature as it corresponded to European values and principles, both societal and political. The revolution signaled a significant shift in Armenia's domestic politics, with pro-Russian politicians being ousted from power and a reformist government taking their place. The change brought about a revaluation of Armenia's relations with Russia. The reformist government sought to distance itself from Russia's aggressive tactics and realign Armenia with the Western values of democracy and human rights.

== Preceding situation ==
Between 2012 and 2017, reported levels of trust in the national government were at 25%, while confidence in the judicial system was at 29%, figures which were below all of Armenia's neighbouring countries at the time.

== Nomination of Sargsyan for the post of Prime Minister ==
Demonstrations and protests began in March 2018, when members of the Republican Party did not exclude the option of nominating Serzh Sargsyan for the prime minister's post. This meant a continuation of Sargsyan's rule (as either prime minister or president) since March 2007. He had amended the constitution in 2015 to remove term limits which would have prevented him doing this.

Protesters had vowed to block the party's headquarters on April 14, where leaders were going to gather to formally nominate Serzh Sargsyan for prime minister. The Republican Party held its meeting outside of the capital Yerevan and unanimously voted to formally nominate Serzh Sargsyan for the office of prime minister. The coalition partner, the Armenian Revolutionary Federation, supported the ruling Republican Party's decision, as did most of the opposition Prosperous Armenia party caucus.

Meanwhile, the Way Out Alliance emerged as a pro-European and anti-Russian political alliance, which actively participated in street protests supporting Nikol Pashinyan following Serzh Sargsyan's nomination for prime minister. The alliance believed that Sargsyan was largely controlled by Moscow and labelled him a 'dictator' who rigged elections. Noting the rise of anti-Russian sentiments in the country, the alliance called for Armenia to develop closer ties with the European Union.

== Protests ==
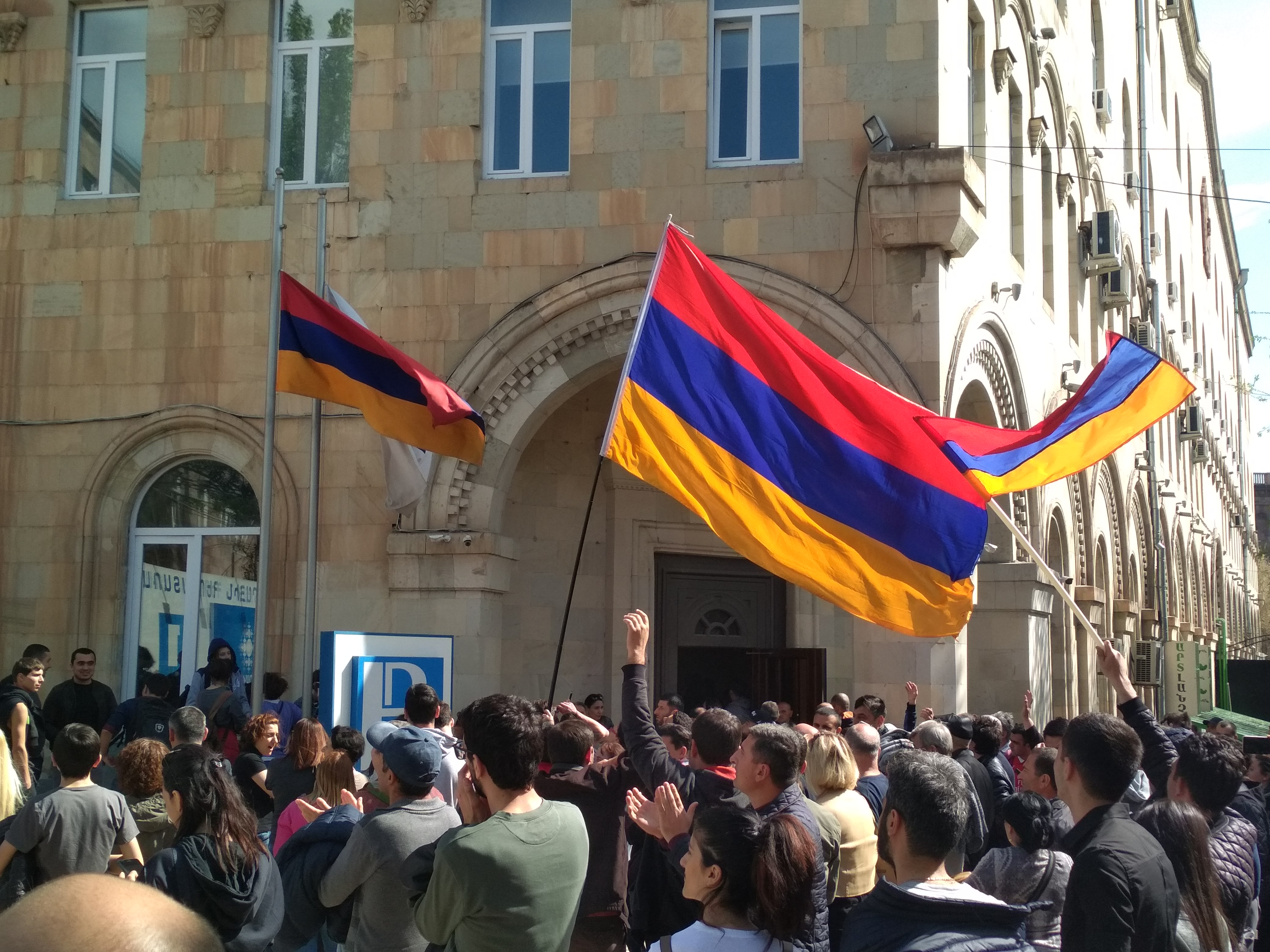
Protests on 14 April 2018

On March 31, 2018, Nikol Pashinyan began his Im Qayl (my step) protest walk, starting in the city of Gyumri, and walking through cities and towns such as Vanadzor, Dilijan, Hrazdan, and Abovyan, before finally reaching Yerevan on April 13 and holding a small rally.

About 100 protesters stayed overnight in France Square after the first day of protests, and an equal number did the same on Saturday night, some sleeping in tents, others gathered around fires. By Sunday morning, the Armenian police had made no effort to disrupt the demonstrations.

On Monday April 16, the "Take a Step, Reject Serzh" campaign began actions of civil disobedience. On April 17, the day that the prime minister's election was scheduled, the protesters intended to block entrances to the building of the National Assembly in order to prevent the vote from taking place. Lines of riot police stopped them from advancing further towards the National Assembly building.

After the election of the former president Serzh Sargsyan as the new prime minister, the protests continued to grow, despite hundreds of people being detained by police. The prime minister in response asked the government to take back the presidential mansion which it had given him a few weeks earlier. The crowds reached 50,000 on the night of April 21, with countless sporadic street closures in the capital, which also began to spread across the country.

As the crowds grew, the new prime minister called repeatedly for talks with the leader of the protest movement, Nikol Pashinyan, but Pashinyan said he was only willing to discuss the terms of the Prime Minister's resignation. After Pashinyan's rally was visited by the Armenian President on the evening of April 21 for a brief chat with Pashinyan, Pashinyan agreed to meet the prime minister at 10 am on April 22, saying he believed the topic would be Serzh Sargsyan's resignation.

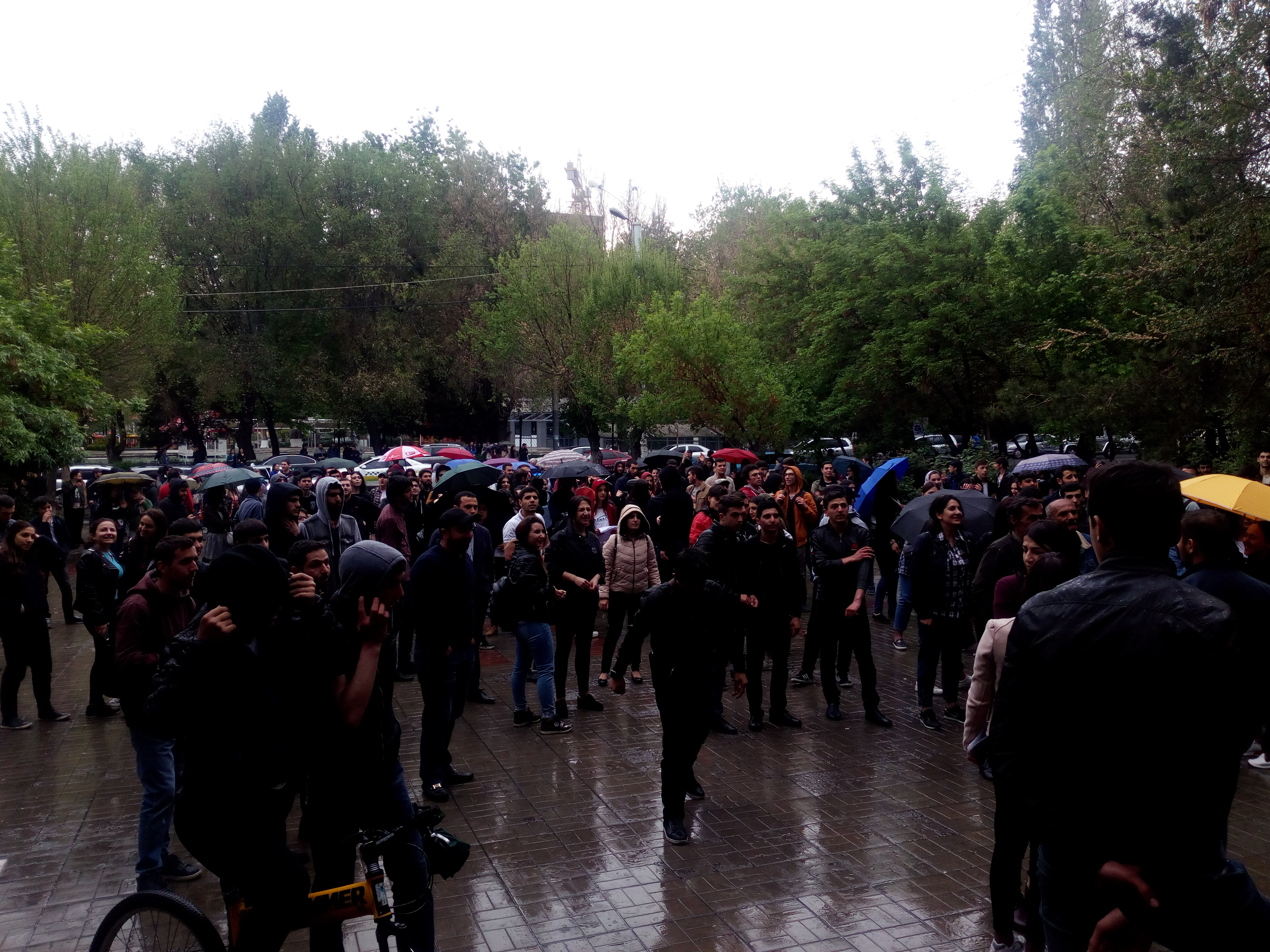
Protesters calling on students and teachers to join the demonstrations

=== April 22 ===
The meeting, which lasted for a mere three minutes, failed to achieve anything, with Sargsyan walking out of it and accusing the opposition of "blackmail" when Pashinyan stated he had only agreed to discuss terms of the Prime Minister's resignation and nothing else. During the meeting, Sargsyan asked Pashinyan not to speak on behalf of the people and not to issue ultimatums to the government, given the low level of support for his political alliance (less than 10 percent of the vote in the past parliamentary elections). He also warned that Pashinyan had not "learned the lessons of March 1", a reference to the protestors killed by police while contesting the validity of the election results of Sargsyan's election 10 years earlier, amounting to an open threat of violence against the protesters gathering daily in around the nation.

Immediately after the meeting, Pashinyan led a group of supporters from the site of the meeting by Republic Square on a long march down Tigran Mets and Artsakh streets to the Erebuni district, where they were met by riot police and stun grenades as Pashinyan was detained followed by mass detentions of protestors, including opposition lawmakers Sasun Mikayelyan and Ararat Mirzoyan. Protests continue throughout the city. By the evening 232 protestors had been detained or arrested, and, according to Radio Free Europe/Radio Liberty, tens of thousands gathered in Republic Square to continue to demand the resignation of PM Serzh Sargsyan. The police issued a statement saying that Pashinyan, Mikaelyan and Mirzoyan had been detained for 72 hours; however criminal charges could only be brought against them if the Republican-controlled National Assembly stripped them of their parliamentary immunity.

=== April 23 ===
Protests resumed on April 23, with media outlets reporting that former and current members of the Armenian armed forces, including participants of the 2016 April War, have joined in the rallies for the first time. This information was later confirmed by the Ministry of Defence.

Pashinyan was released at 3pm, and went directly to Republic Square where he spoke briefly, saying he would return at 6:30pm. By 4:30pm, Prime Minister Serzh Sargsyan had posted a message on the official website of the prime minister announcing his resignation. Former prime minister Karen Karapetyan succeeded Sargsyan as acting prime minister.

=== April 24 ===
April 24 is marked as the national day of remembrance of the Armenian genocide. The protesters gathered in masses and walked to Tsitsernakaberd, Armenia's national Genocide Memorial. No protest was held on that day.

=== April 25 ===
Pashinyan called for renewed protests on 25 April after talks with the Republican Party were cancelled due to Karapetyan's refusal to accept preconditions laid down by Pashinyan. Earlier, Pashinyan stated that the Republican Party had no right to hold power in Armenia, and that a "people's candidate" should be appointed prime minister prior to holding snap elections. He added that the protest movement should nominate this transitional prime minister, a position that was rejected by the current government as it would violate the law. Protesters took to the streets to block the road to Yerevan's international airport and the road leading to the border with Georgia. Meanwhile, the Prosperous Armenia Party and the Armenian Revolutionary Federation both declared their support for Pashinyan's movement, with the latter pulling out of the ruling coalition. Pashinyan vowed to continue the protests until he was appointed prime minister.

=== April 26 ===
Tens of thousands continued to protest on 26 April, though Pashinyan asked protestors to stop blocking streets. The ruling Republican Party announced it was ready to meet with Pashinyan without any preconditions, while Pashinyan offered to negotiate with them while insisting he must become prime minister.

=== April 27 ===
Pashinyan called on his supporters to suspend their rallies in Yerevan for 2 days while he held rallies in Gyumri on 27 April and Vanadzor on 28 April. In the morning he met with Armenia's largely ceremonial president, leaders of the governing party's former coalition partner the ARF, as well as Parliament's second largest faction, Prosperous Armenia. In an interview on the same day, the president hailed the "New Armenia" that has come about due to the protests, and the chance for "a real democratic state". Meanwhile, the ruling Republican Party announced that they do not see any regime change occurring in Armenia.

=== April 28 ===
On 28 April, Pashinyan held rallies in Vanadzor and Ijevan, while the second and third largest parties in Parliament – Prosperous Armenia and the ARF – announced they would support his candidacy for PM, and the ruling Republican Party announced they would not block Pashinyan's candidacy, and that they would not put forward their own candidate.

=== May 1 ===
Parliament held elections for a new prime minister, with the opposition leader Pashinyan the only nominee, as over 100,000 people watched the 9 hour session being broadcast live at Republic Square. However, the majority party blocked his nomination by voting against him with one exception. After the election, prominent Armenian singers such as Iveta Mukuchyan and Sona Shahgeldyan performed for the crowd and made inspiring speeches. Pashinyan walked to Republic Square and told the crowd to go on strike the next day, and block all transportation from 8:15 in the morning until 5 in the evening, then gather for another rally at 7pm in Republic Square.

=== May 2 ===
The nation ground to a halt as countless streets and highways were peacefully blocked throughout the nation, and many workers and businesses went on strike. The main airport access road was cut off, with some workers striking, and even land crossings were blocked. Approximately 150,000 people gathered in another evening rally in Republic Square to listen to Pashinyan speak, and were told that he had been informed that due to the strike, the ruling party had decided to support his candidacy in the next round of voting on May 8. Protests were suspended in the meantime.

=== May 8 ===
On May 8, Parliament had another vote for a new prime minister, and again Nikol Pashinyan was the only candidate. This time, the majority Republican Party gave Pashinyan enough votes to win with a 59–42 margin. All the votes against Pashinyan still came from the Republican Party.

== Reactions ==
On April 4 Edmon Marukyan, leader of the Bright Armenia party, which cooperated with the Civil Contract party led by Nikol Pashinyan in the Way Out Alliance published an article in Aravot newspaper, in which he stated his preference for formal means of counteracting the ruling coalition rather than civil disobedience actions.

Leader of the Free Democrats party and former MP Khachatur Kokobelyan attended protests and expressed his support for the actions.

Many cultural figures had already declared solidarity with the opposition movement. In particular, well-known musician Serj Tankian of System of a Down addressed the activists declaring his solidarity and support, stressing the impermissibility of one-party rule in Armenia. Some organizations of the diaspora, in particular the Assembly of Armenians of Europe, also expressed support for the opposition.

The Helsinki Committee of Armenia noted that freedom of expression and media had improved significantly. Meanwhile, the Helsinki Citizens' Assembly–Vanadzor called for further strengthening Armenia's democracy and government transparency. The Europe in Law Association called for the elimination of corruption and for the government to strengthen Armenia's judicial system.

Mamikon Hovespyan, Director of Pink Armenia, an LGBT rights group, stated "while LGBT+ people were present at previous protests, this time they were more visible and accepted."

Following the revolution, it was recommended that an EU Advisory Group to Armenia be reestablished as a way to counter Russian influence in Armenia, tackle corruption, and to assist post-revolutionary Armenia to build closer ties with the EU and continue implementing its reform agenda. Many called for prime minister Nikol Pashinyan to increase engagement with Europe as a way to reduce the country's overdependence on Russia.

Styopa Safaryan, founder of the Armenian Institute of International and Security Affairs stated that Armenian authorities have been making progress to implement democratic reforms following the revolution.

=== International reactions ===
- Council of Europe: The Council of Europe praised the peaceful transition of power, and hailed the protests as a milestone in Armenia's history and a "euphoric moment" that unified the nation.
- European Union: On April 24 the head of the EU Delegation to Armenia hailed the success in the civic disobedience campaign in the country, promising a more intensive process towards the ratification of the Comprehensive and Enhanced Partnership Agreement.
- Georgia: Mikheil Saakashvili, former president of Georgia, released a video on April 23 congratulating the Armenian people on Sargsyan's resignation. He stated: "Today you have every right to be proud of yourself, to be proud of the fact that you are Armenians, the proud people who could prove to the whole world that they have dignity, that they want to live in normal human conditions, free from corruption. Armenia has a great future; today I was convinced of it again. I support you, we will always be with you. Well done!" He also claimed that the movement is a "rebellion against Russia".
- Russia: Foreign Ministry spokeswoman Maria Zakharova praised the peaceful transition, adding that "Armenia, Russia is always with you!" A statement on the Foreign Ministry official web page reads: "We hope that the situation will develop exclusively in the legal and constitutional field, and all political forces will show responsibility and readiness for a constructive dialogue. We are convinced that the prompt return of life in the country to normal and the restoration of public accord meet the fundamental interests of the fraternal Armenia."
- United States: On April 23, US Ambassador Richard Mills praised the Armenian police and anti-government protesters led by Nikol Pashinyan for avoiding bloodshed during their standoff that led to the resignation of Prime Minister Serzh Sargsyan. A statement by the US State Department expressed hope that his successor will be chosen in a transparent and constitutional manner. The statement also called on Armenia's leading political groups to "avoid an escalation of the situation and any violent actions." Protests were held by Armenians in various communities of the United States, with 5,000 protesters gathering in solidarity with those protesting in Armenia on April 22 and additional protests being held on other days, including May 8.

== Impact ==
During the 2020 Belarusian protests, the Armenian revolution was brought up as a model for Belarus for its lack of anti-Russian or pro-Western geopolitical orientation by commentators such as Carl Bildt, Anders Åslund, Ian Bremmer, Yaroslav Trofimov, Ben Judah, and others. Belarusian journalist Franak Viačorka criticized this notion. Armenia's Foreign Minister Zohrab Mnatsakanyan also rejected the comparisons. "Armenia followed its own path and it's not quite correct to draw parallels based on that. True, there might be some common parameters, but on the whole these are different situations," he said.

== Armenian Velvet Revolution in art ==
The Armenian velvet revolution found response in modern Armenian art. One of the first artists who touched on the topic was the artist Anna Soghomonyan with her painting "The Armenian Velvet Revolution". This is a multi-figure composition which includes people of different types who participated in the events of spring 2018. According to the author, this painting holds the symbolism of being a concentrated reflection of the emotions experienced during the revolution. It was also sold on the day of the defeat of the Armenians in the Second Artsakh War which Soghomonyan argues may symbolize the failure of the hopes of the national awakening of 2018.

In July 2018, in the exhibition hall "Albert and Tove Boyajyan" of the State Academy of Fine Arts of Armenia, art historian Meri Ghazaryan organized a photo exhibition entitled "Velvet Revolution: Between Picture and Reality", which presented the works of young photographers who caught the fresh breath of the revolution, known and unknown pages of spring events, impressive episodes and faces.

In October 2018, art critic Vardan Jaloyan and a group of artists organized an exhibition of contemporary art "Revolutionary Sensorium" at the History Museum of Armenia, where the key events of the revolution were presented to museum visitors in a combination of photographs and video installations.

On May 9, 2019, within the framework of the 59th Venice Biennale of Art, the Armenian pavilion was opened, where the project "Revolutionary Sensorium" was presented under the curatorship of art critic Susanna Gulamiryan. The participants of the project were a group of artists "Artlab Yerevan" (Hovhannes Margaryan, Vardan Jaloyan, Artur Petrosyan, Gagik Charchyan) and artist Narine Arakelyan.

In November 2018, the literary website "Groghutsav", founded by writers Arpi Voskanyan and Hambartsum Hambartsumyan, was relaunched. Since 2011, Groghutsav has rallied writers involved in the opposition, political struggle and not disdaining to bring political and social problems to literature on one platform, but in July 2017, due to lack of financial resources, it ceased its activities. The restarted project has a number of subprojects, one of which is called the "Revolutionary Program". This program is carried out by publishing works that focus on the velvet revolution in Armenia in 2018 with its results and consequences.

== See also ==
- 2008 Armenian presidential election protests, especially clashes that occurred 1 March
- 2011 Armenian protests, triggered over Karen Karapetyan's decision to ban street vendors in Yerevan
- Mashtots Park Movement, 2012 protests to save green space in Yerevan
- 2013 Armenian protests, over Serzh Sargsyan's re-election
- 2013 Armenian protests over public transportation fare hikes
- Electric Yerevan, 2015 protests over electricity rate hikes
- 2016 Yerevan hostage crisis demonstrations
- I Am Not Alone, a 2019 documentary film about the revolution
- 2020–2021 Armenian protests
- Colour revolution
- Serzhik, go away!
- List of protests in the 21st century
