= Prosecutor General of Armenia =

Government agency overseeing public procurator system

Prosecutor General of Armenia emblem

The Prosecutor General's Office of Armenia (Armenian: Հայաստանի Հանրապետության դատախազություն, romanized: Hayastani glkhavor datakhazut’yun) is a government agency tasked for supervising the public procurator system in Armenia, exercising its authority through the Prosecutor General of Armenia. It oversees the enforcement of Armenian law by law enforcement agencies such as the Police of Armenia and the National Security Service. The office is located on 5 Vazgen Sargsyan Street, Yerevan. The current Prosecutor General is Anna Vardapetyan.

== History ==
The Prosecutor General's Office of the First Republic of Armenia began to operate on 6 December 1918, when the ruling council adopted the law "On the application of the laws of the former Russian Empire on the territory of Armenia”. In December 1922, the Soviet Union began to create its own governmental institutions and legal systems. During this period, a prosecutor's office in the USSR Supreme Court, with a subdivision of that office being created in the Transcaucasian Socialist Federative Soviet Republic (which was one of the predecessors to what is now Armenia) was established. On 20 July 1933, the Office of Public Procurator of the USSR was founded by a joint decision of the Central Executive Committee of the Soviet Union and the Council of People's Commissars, which resulted in the creation of republican affiliate units in Soviet Republics. On 27 February 1959, a board was established in the Soviet prosecutor's office headed by the chief prosecutor of the Armenian SSR.

On 5 July 1995, following the collapse of the Soviet Union, the first Constitution of Armenia was adopted. As a result, an independent military and prosecutor's office was established on 5 October of that year. The agency became a full member of the Coordinating Council of Prosecutors General of the Commonwealth of Independent States in 1999 and became a member of the International Association of Prosecutors and the Conference of Prosecutors General of Europe in 2005.

== Organizational structure ==
The office has the following organizational structure:

- Central office
  - Investigation department for
  - Supervision department
  - Department for Charge Defense and Appealing of Judicial Acts
  - Public security department
  - Department for the protection of state interests
  - Legal department
  - Department for international legal cooperation
  - Department for corruption and economic crimes
  - Department of organization legal assistance
  - IT department
  - Secretariat
  - Protocol department
  - Division of public relations
  - Internal audit division
  - Staff management division
  - Organizational division
  - Statistics and analysis division
- Military Prosecutor
  - Investigation division
  - Supervision division
  - Division for the protection of state interests
- Garrison offices
  - Yerevan Garrison Military Prosecutor's Office
  - Goris Garrison Military Prosecutor's Office
  - Lori Garrison Military Prosecutor's Office
  - Sevan Garrison Military Prosecutor's Office
  - Shirak Garrison Military Prosecutor's Office
  - Yeghegnadzor Garrison Military Prosecutor's Office
  - Garrison No. 1 Military Prosecutor's Office
  - Garrison No. 2 Military Prosecutor's Office
  - Garrison No. 3 Military Prosecutor's Office
- City of Yerevan prosecutors offices:
  - Prosecutor's Office of Yerevan City
  - Prosecutor's Office of the Avan and Nor-Nork Districts
  - Prosecutor's Office of the Malatia-Sebastia District
  - Prosecutor's Office of the Ajapnyak and Davtashen Districts
  - Prosecutor's Office of the Arabkir and Kanaker-Zeytun Districts
  - Prosecutor's Office of the Erebuni and Nubarashen Districts
  - Prosecutor's Office of the Kentron and Nork-Marash Districts
  - Prosecutor's Office of Shengavit Administrative District
- Regional prosecutor's offices:
  - Prosecutor's Office of Aragatsotn Region
  - Prosecutor's Office of Ararat Region
  - Prosecutor's Office of Armavir Region
  - Prosecutor's Office of Gegharkunik Region
  - Prosecutor's Office of Kotayk Region
  - Prosecutor's Office of Shirak Region
  - Prosecutor's Office of Lori Region
  - Prosecutor's Office of Syunik Region
  - Prosecutor's Office of Vayots Dzor Region
  - Prosecutor's Office of Tavush Region
- Territorial divisions

== List of Prosecutors General ==
- Suren Osipyan (1971–1988)
- Vladimir Nazaryan (1988–1990)
- Artavazd Gevorgyan (1990–1997)
- Henrik Khachatryan (1997–1998)
- Zhirayr Kharatyan (1998)
- Aghvan Hovsepyan (1998–1999)
- Boris Nazaryan (1999–2001)
- Aram Tamazyan (2001–2004)
- Aghvan Hovsepyan (2004–2013)
- Gevorg Kostanyan (2013–2016)
- Artur Davtyan (2016–2022)
- Anna Vardapetyan (2022–present)

== See also ==
- Constitutional Court of Armenia
- Constitution of Armenia
- Court of Cassation of Armenia
- Judiciary of Armenia
