= Alliance Party (Armenia) =

Political party in Armenia

Alliance Party Դաշինք կուսակցություն
- Leader: Tigran Urikhanyan
- Founded: 2015
- Headquarters: Yerevan, Armenia
- Ideology: Progressivism; Social capitalism; Russophilia
- Political position: Centre
- National affiliation: Tsarukyan Alliance (2017–2018); Homeland Salvation Movement (2020–2021); Armenia is Our Home (2021)
- National Assembly: 0 / 107

Website
- alyans.am

The Alliance Party (Armenian: Դաշինք կուսակցություն, romanized: Dashink’ kusakts’ut’yun), also known as the Alliance of Progressive Centrists, is an Armenian political party. It was founded in 2015 and is currently led by Tigran Urikhanyan.

== History ==
Tigran Urikhanyan had served in the National Assembly following the 2012 Armenian parliamentary election as a candidate running with the Prosperous Armenia party.

Urikhanyan subsequently left Prosperous Armenia and founded the Alliance Party in 2015. He was nominated as Chairman of the party. The party participated in the 2017 Armenian parliamentary elections as part of the Tsarukyan Alliance. The alliance won 31 seats out of 105 in the National Assembly. Despite the alliance's victory, it officially dissolved prior to the 2018 Armenian parliamentary election.

The Alliance Party chose not to participate in the 2018 elections, although Urikhanyan participated under Prosperous Armenia's electoral list.

Following the 2021 Armenian political crisis and the 2020–2021 Armenian protests, Urikhanyan announced that the Alliance Party would participate in the 2021 Armenian parliamentary elections. There was discussion of the Alliance Party joining the "New Union" political alliance with the Voice of the Nation Party and the Towards Russia Party, however Urikhanyan opted not to join.

On 26 May 2021, the Alliance Party confirmed its intentions to participate in the 2021 elections under the Armenia is Our Home party. The Armenia is Our Home party is led by Ara Abramyan, but Urikhanyan was nominated to be the candidate for prime minister. The Armenia is Our Home party included members from Urikhanyan's Alliance Party, as well as, members from the Union of Armenians of Russia organization. Following the election, the Armenia is Our Home party received just 0.96% of the popular vote, failing to win any seats in the National Assembly. The Alliance Party currently acts as an extra-parliamentary force.

Some Alliance Party members, including Tigran Urikhanyan, participated in the 2023 Yerevan City Council elections on the Public Voice Party's ballot. Following the election, the Public Voice Party won 7 seats in the Yerevan City Council.

== Ideology ==
The party self describes its principle ideology as progressive centrist and believes that liberal, democratic values are acceptable within the framework of preserving national and traditional values. The party believes in creating a strong state, promoting development, strengthening human rights, democracy, and the rule of law. In terms of economics, the party favors effectively applying a socialist-liberal system of economic order. The party recognizes the need for a system based on economic liberalism, however, some aspects of the economy would be regulated and coordinated by the state.

In regards to foreign policy, the party supports continued cooperation with Russia and believes Armenia should further integrate with other Eurasian Economic Union member states.

== Activities ==
On 9 November 2020, the party signed a joint declaration with the other member parties of the Homeland Salvation Movement calling on Prime Minister Nikol Pashinyan to resign during the 2020–2021 Armenian protests.

== Electoral record ==
=== Parliamentary elections ===
Election	Leader	Votes	%	Seats	+/–	Position	Government
2017 (Note: As part of Tsarukyan Alliance.)	Tigran Urikhanyan	428,965	27,35	31 / 105	▲31	▲2nd	Opposition
2018	Did not take part						
2021 (Note: Run as Armenia is Our Home Party.)	Tigran Urikhanyan	12,149	0.95	0 / 107	▼31	▼13th	Extra-parliamentary

== See also ==
- Programs of political parties in Armenia
