= Naira Zohrabyan =

Armenian politician

Member of the National Assembly
- In office 2008–2021

Personal details
- Born: 8 May 1965 (age 60) Yerevan, Armenian SSR
- Party: Independent

Naira Zohrabyan (born 8 May 1965) is an Armenian politician who was a member of the National Assembly of Armenia for the Prosperous Armenia party.

She stood for her party to become the Mayor of Yerevan at the 2018 Yerevan City Council election. She refused to attend a televised debate. She came a very distant second behind Hayk Marutyan.

== Biography ==
Naira studied in Yerevan School 21. In 1987 she graduated from the Yerevan Fine Arts and Theatre Institute, with a degree in Drama Studies.

From 1989 to 2006 she was a political analyst in Haykakan Zhamanak daily.

== Career ==
She previously served as a Representative of the Parliamentary Assembly of the Council of Europe and was the former Head of the Standing Committee on European Integration.

In December 2020, Parliament removed Zohrabyan from her position as Chair of the Human Rights Committee over her remarks made earlier in December addressed to Prime Minister of Armenia, Nikol Pashinyan.

In January 2021, at a meeting held by the Armenian government in the parliament, Pashinyan stated in response to a question from Zohrabyan in regard to the Battle of Shusha, that "there was no option in the whole negotiation process to prevent the Azerbaijani refugees from returning to Shusha," adding that before the Armenian forces seized control of Shusha in 1992, "90% or more of the city's residents were Azerbaijanis." These statements created a resonance in the country, with political figures including Aram Sargsyan, Mikayel Minasyan and Zaruhi Postanjyan, criticising Pashinyan. At a briefing, local journalists asked the MPs representing My Step Alliance, which is led by Pashinyan, whether or not they had "any doubts" of Shusha being "an Armenian city," though left the briefing without answering the question. On 3 December 2020, Deputy Head of the Shushi Province, Samvel Harutyunyan, stated that about 4,500 Armenians were displaced from Shusha.

On the land mine situation in Nagorno-Karabakh, Representative of the leader of Nagorno-Karabakh on special assignments Boris Avagyan claimed that HALO Trust handed over minefield maps to Turkish special services, which, in his opinion, helped Azerbaijan's successful military operations during the second Nagorno-Karabakh war in the autumn of 2020. Ayvagyan claimed that under the pretext of studying dangerous areas, this organization carried out reconnaissance work throughout the territory of Nagorno-Karabakh. Zohrabyan supported these claims. HALO Trust said the accusation was "an absolute lie".

== Personal life ==
Naira Zohrabyan is the widow of Samvel Mkrtchyan. She has one daughter.
