= Imran Usmanov =

Imran Usmanov Усманов Ӏимран
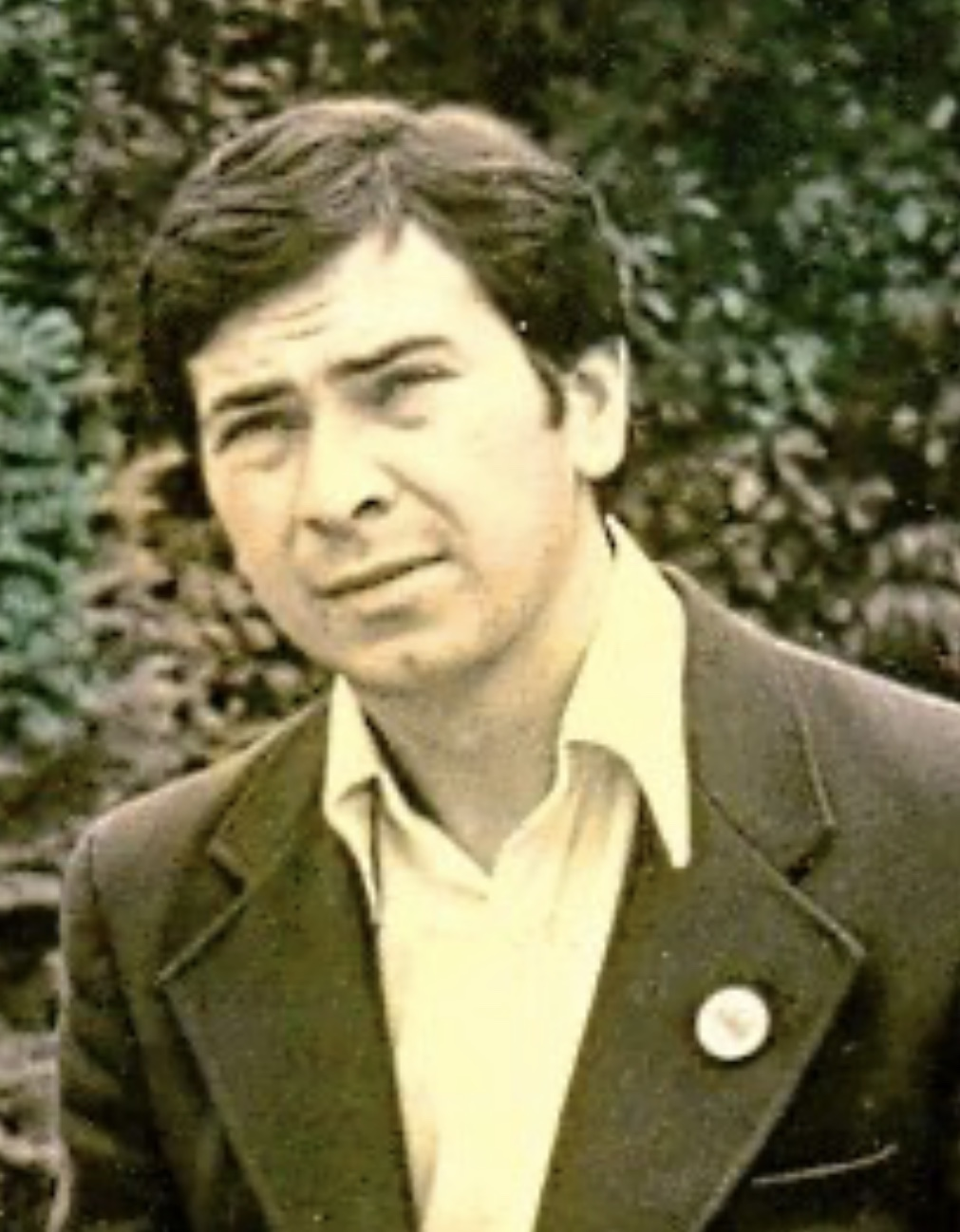

Background information
- Birth name: Imran Usmanov
- Born: 2 March 1953; Osh Region, Kirghiz Soviet Socialist Republic, Soviet Union
- Died: 11 July 2017 (aged 64); Grozny, Chechnya, Russia
- Genres: Music of Chechnya, Folk music, Torch song
- Occupation: Singer Music producer Songwriter
- Instrument: Voice
- Years active: 1971–2017

Imran Hermanovich Usmanov (Chechen: Усманов Ӏимран, Russian: Имран Германович Усманов) (2 March 1953 – 11 July 2017) was a Chechen music producer, song writer and folk singer whose deep baritone voice and songs about life are regarded as classics in Chechen music.

Born in 1953 to Chechen parents in Nozhay-Yurt, Chechnya, he graduated from Rostov-on-Don Music Teachers Training College. He is the eldest of two brothers; Ilman and Nazar.

In April 2004, Imran announced that he would compose music to educate children on the danger of land mines.

His final appointment was as Director of Chechnya's Philharmonic Society.
