= Union State =

Supranational union of Belarus and Russia

Union State: Союзное государство (Russian); Саюзная дзяржава (Belarusian)
- The Union State, with disputed territories in light green (Note: Crimea, which was annexed by Russia in 2014, remains internationally recognised as a part of Ukraine. Donetsk, Luhansk, Kherson, and Zaporizhzhia oblasts, which were annexed—though are only partially occupied—in 2022, also remain internationally recognised as a part of Ukraine. The southernmost Kuril Islands have been the subject of a territorial dispute with Japan since their occupation by the Soviet Union at the end of World War II.)
- Headquarters: 8/5 Staraya Square, Entrance 3, 103132 Moscow, Russia
- Largest city: Moscow; 55°45′N 37°37′E
- Official languages: Belarusian; Russian
- Demonyms: Russians, Belarusians
- Type: Supranational union
- Member states: Belarus; Russia
- Government: Supranational union
  - Chairman of the Supreme State Council: (Belarus) Alexander Lukashenko
  - Chairman of the Council of Ministers: (Russia) Mikhail Mishustin
  - General (State) Secretary: (Russia) Sergey Glazyev
- Legislature: Supreme State Council and Council of Ministers
  - Upper house: Supreme State Council
  - Lower house: Council of Ministers

Formation
  - Dissolution of the Soviet Union: 26 December 1991
  - Commonwealth of Belarus and Russia: 2 April 1997
  - Treaty on the Creation of a Union State of Russia and Belarus: 8 December 1999

Area
  - Total: 17,305,846 km^{2} (6,681,824 sq mi)^{a}

Population
  - 2025 estimate: ▲159,729,208^{a}
  - Density: 8.9/km^{2} (23.1/sq mi)
- GDP (PPP): 2025 estimate
  - Total: ▲$7.502 trillion
- GDP (nominal): 2024 estimate
  - Total: ▲$2.257 trillion
- Currency: Belarusian ruble; Russian ruble
- Time zone: UTC+2 to +12
- Date format: dd.mm.yyyy
- Website soyuz.by/en
- 1. Combined Belarus and Russian figures, including Crimea and territories annexed in 2022 that are not internationally recognized.

The Union State (Note: Russian: Союзное государство, romanized: Soyuznoye gosudarstvo; Belarusian: Саюзная дзяржава, romanized: Sajuznaja dziaržava.) is a supranational union consisting of Belarus and Russia, with the stated aim of deepening the relationship between the two states through integration in economic and defence policy. The Union State initially aimed to create a federation; however, both countries remain independent, and the Union State instead exhibits features of a confederation.

The Union State is based on the Treaty on the Union of Belarus and Russia, an international treaty signed by Belarus and Russia on 2 April 1997. Although it consists of only Russia and Belarus, other countries are allowed to join. The supranational union is ruled through the Supreme State Council, as well as other governing bodies. The current chairman of the Supreme State Council is the president of Belarus, Alexander Lukashenko, who has held the position since 2000. The present goal of the Union State mainly focuses on economic integration, taxation, and integration of defence and intelligence apparatus.

== History of formation ==
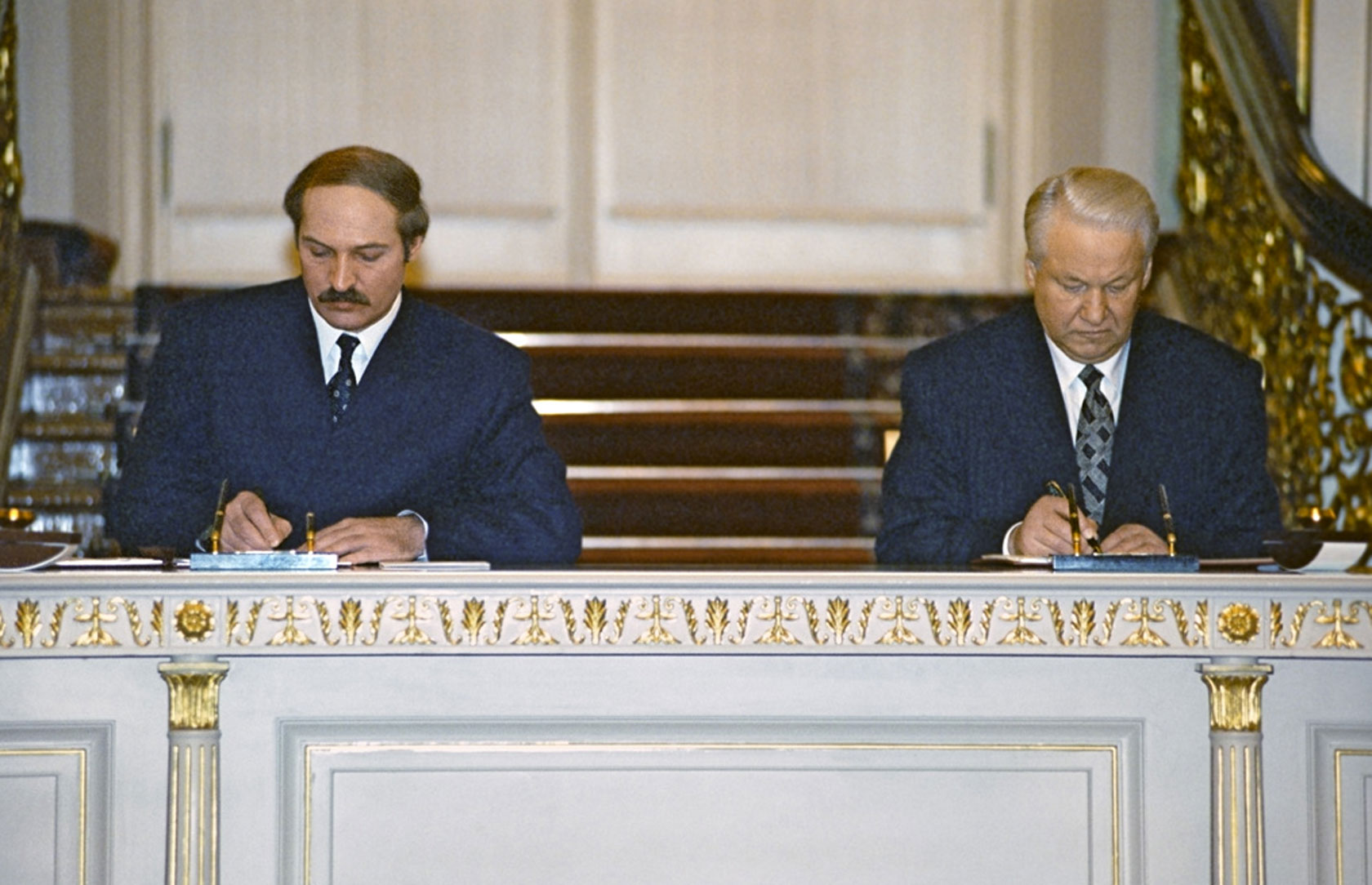
Presidents Alexander Lukashenko and Boris Yeltsin signing the founding treaty of the Russian-Belarusian Union at the Grand Kremlin Palace in Moscow, 2 April 1997

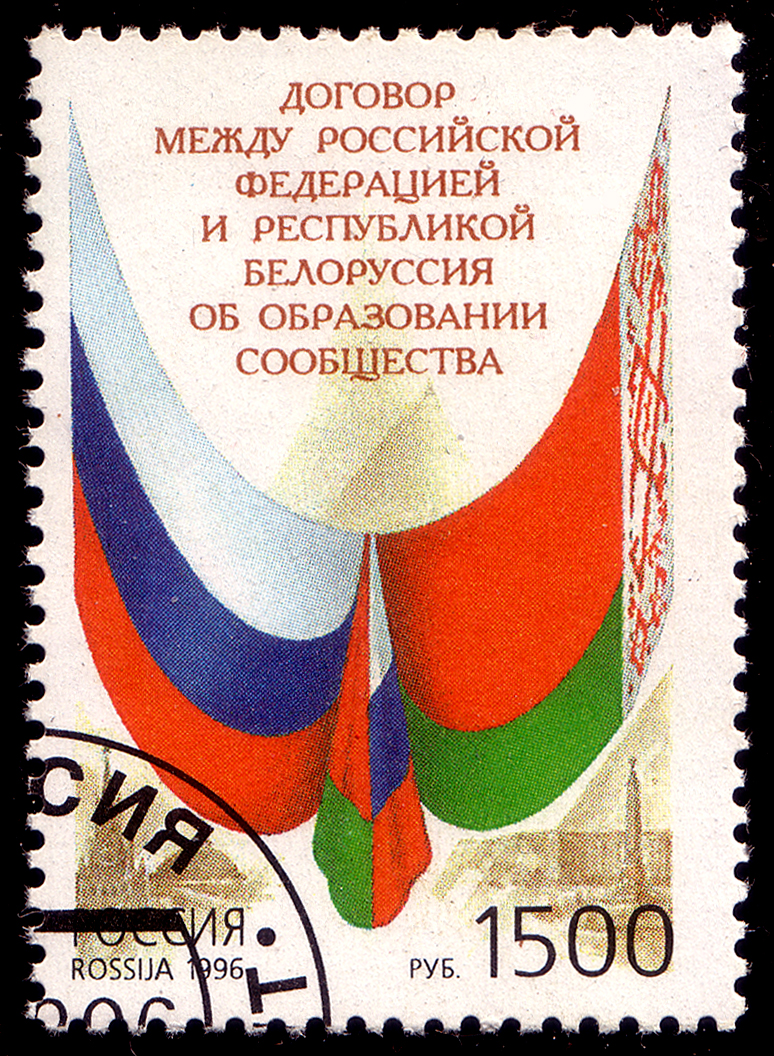
Russian postage stamp commemorating the Treaty between the Russian Federation and the Republic of Belarus establishing the Union on 2 April 1996

On 6 January 1995, the governments of Belarus and Russia, "intending to continue the implementation of the provisions of the CIS Treaty on the Economic Union", signed the Agreement on a Customs Union. On 21 February, they signed the Agreement on Friendship, Good Neighborly Relations and Cooperation. On 2 April 1996, the two presidents "relying on the historically established commonality of fates of their peoples" concluded the Treaty on the Establishment of a Community. As a result, the Community of Belarus and Russia was founded. The basis of the union was strengthened on 2 April 1997 with the signing of the Treaty on the Union between Belarus and Russia, at which time its name was changed to the Union of Belarus and Russia.

Several further agreements were signed on 25 December 1998, with the intention of providing greater political, economic and social integration. Despite initial enthusiasm for the process of integrating the two states, Belarus and Russia were significantly different in terms of the size of their population and territory, as well as their economic systems. The Russian government implemented sweeping reforms during the transition to a market economy, while the Belarusian government suspended reforms toward a market economy in 1994 in an effort to maintain Soviet-style centralization. The two states had military-political and economic interests, with integration giving Belarus the potential to buy Russian oil and gas at significantly lower prices, while granting Belarusian goods access to much larger markets. According to Dmitri Trenin: "Belarus' geography alone makes it supremely important to any Russian leadership... [as] a principal defensive bulwark and a forward base for power projection".

Nevertheless, the nature of the political entity remained vague. Under pressure from his political opponents, who argued for a reunion of the two states, and from Belarusian president Alexander Lukashenko, who sought to tie his excessively weak economy to Russia's stronger one, Russian president Boris Yeltsin initiated the creation of the Union to harmonize the political and economic differences between the two countries. In foreign affairs, Lukashenko held a long-term goal of unifying Belarus with Russia.

According to some observers, Lukashenko's intention was also to gain great power, becoming president of a future Russia–Belarus federation after Yeltsin's demise due to his all-time low popularity and was succeeded by Vladimir Putin as president in 2000. There was also the Freedom March, a 1999 protest against unification in the Belarusian capital of Minsk. Putin's election and the Freedom March forced Lukashenko to cancel his plans and maintain a balance between the independence of Belarus and Putin's increasing pressure for further integration of the two countries into the Union State.

The Treaty on the Creation of a Union State of Russia and Belarus was signed on 8 December 1999. The intention was to achieve a federation, with a common head of state, legislature, flag, coat of arms, anthem, constitution, army, citizenship and currency. The treaty proclaimed the creation of a Union State "which shall mark a new stage in the process of unification of the peoples of the two countries into a democratic State ruled by law". It also stressed that the Union State "shall be a secular, democratic, social State ruled by law in which political and ideological diversity are recognized". The Union was ratified by the Russian State Duma on 22 December 1999 and the National Assembly of Belarus on 26 January 2000. On the latter date, the Treaty and the Union came into effect.

Kazakh president Nursultan Nazarbayev had put forward a similar proposal in 1994, envisioning the founding of a Eurasian union, but this proposal was not adopted until 29 May 2014 with the formation of the Eurasian Economic Union.

== Governing bodies and legal framework ==
The Treaty on the Creation of a Union State creates legal framework as constitutional act and establishes the following institutions

- Supreme State Council
- Council of Ministers
- Union Parliament
- Court of the Union
- Accounting Chamber

The Union State based on its founding treaties has exclusive jurisdiction over the creation of a single economic space and legal foundations for a common market, monetary union, single tax and pricing policy, unified development and procurement of defence equipment, unified system of technical support for the armed forces. Common command of regional military is further realized through many other documents based on this Union State jurisdiction, common border policy and other jurisdictions.

Besides exclusive jurisdictions of the Union State there are joint jurisdiction of the Union State and the subjects of the Union State that includes joint defence policy, harmonization and unification of the legislation of the subjects of the Union State, development of science, education, culture, formation of a common scientific, technological and information space, migration, working conditions and labor protection, social security, combating terrorism, corruption and others.

Outside the limits of the exclusive jurisdiction of the Union State and subjects of joint jurisdiction of the Union State and the subjects of the Union State, the subjects of the Union State retain the full completeness of state power.

Pavel Borodin was the first State Secretary of the Union, serving from 2000 to 2011. He was succeeded by Grigory Rapota (2011–2021) and Dmitry Mezentsev (2021–2025). In April 2025, Sergey Glazyev was appointed State Secretary, succeeding Mezentsev, who became the Russian presidential envoy to the Constitutional Court.

Union State is ruled through Supreme State Council of the Union. The Supreme State Council of the Union includes the member heads of states, respective governments, and both chambers of parliaments. Decisions on Supreme Council are made by principle of one state – one vote and presidents of states give that vote. Supreme Council includes the chairman of the Executive Committee of the Union that have an advisory vote. The chairman of the Supreme State Council is the head of one of the participating States on a rotation basis, unless the participating States agree otherwise.

Supreme State Council makes decisions on issues regarding the security of the member states of the Union including their collective protection from outside threats, the protection of the Union's borders, military development, and many other issues.

The Council of Ministers is composed of the member states' Prime Ministers, Ministers of Foreign Affairs, Economy, and Finance and the State Secretary of the Union. Permanent Committee of the Union State is formed as permanent working body of Council of Ministers. The current chairman of the Council of Ministers is Mikhail Mishustin.

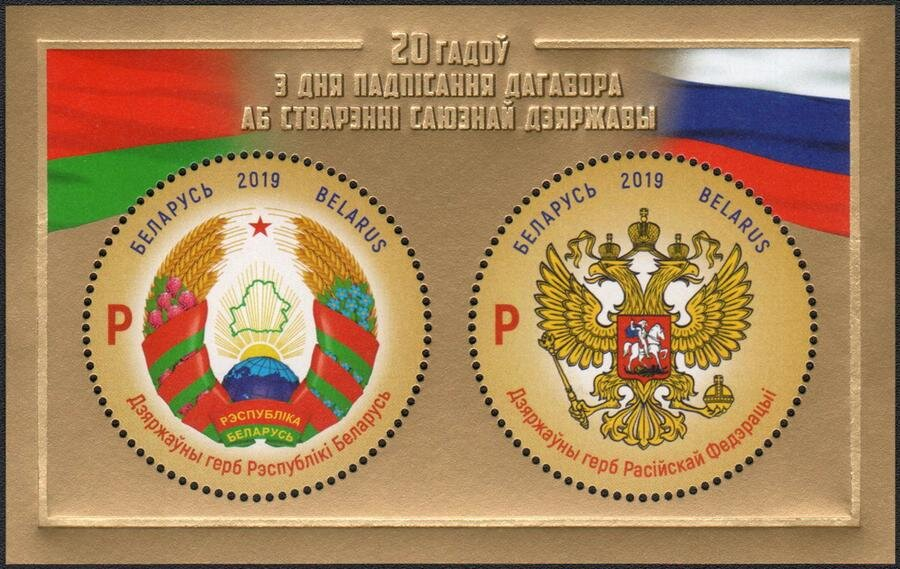
20th Anniversary of Russia Belarus Union Treaty

The Parliamentary Assembly of the Union comprises two chambers – the House of the Union and the House of Representatives. The House of Representatives should contain 75 deputies from Russia and 28 from Belarus, elected by the general populace of each. According to treaty, currently only House of the Union is formed and it consists of 72 deputies – 36 from Russia and 36 from Belarus. Before the elections for the House of Representatives of the Union State Parliament, the functions of the Union State Parliament are performed by the Parliamentary Assembly of the Union of Belarus and Russia in accordance with paragraph 4 of Article 70 of the Treaty on the Establishment of the Union State of 8 December 1999. Regular sessions of the Parliamentary Assembly House of the Union are held twice a year and for Quorum at least two third is needed to be present. House of the Union Parliament has 1 president and 4 vice presidents and 8 permanent committees for different areas of legislature. The current chairman of the Parliamentary Assembly of the Union is Vyacheslav Volodin. On 21 December 2020, the 59th joint session of the Parliamentary Assembly approved the Union State budget for 2021 at approximately 4.715 billion rubles (around US$61.6 million).

The Court of Union should consist of nine judges appointed for six-year terms. But while provisions for court are given in adopted treaty court was not formed.

The Accounting Chamber is tasked with controlling the implementation of the Union State budget. It consists of 11 members, who are appointed for a period of 6 years from among the citizens of the member states who have experience in control and audit who are appointed by the Parliament of the Union State on the proposal of the Council of Ministers. The Accounting Chamber establishes its own regulations, which are approved by the Council of Ministers.

== Language ==
The official languages of the Union State are the state languages of the participating states. Russian is used as a working language in the common organs of the Union State.

== Developments ==
Shortly after its inauguration, both member states seemed to lose their enthusiasm for the Union, with first Russia, and then Belarus, restoring customs controls along their common border in 2001, effectively suspending the customs union until it was restored in 2010. Plans had also been set in motion to implement a common currency across the Union, but these have been postponed several times.

On 16 November 2010, it was announced by the Union State website that the Constitutional Act was 99% ready.

=== Common currency ===
Belarusian president Alexander Lukashenko promised to introduce a common currency on 1 January 2004. The currency was not introduced, and the plan was pushed back by one year. On 1 January 2005, the Union State again failed to introduce a common currency, and it was again postponed by one year, which, in 2006, happened once again. During a press-conference in Minsk on 2 February 2006, Pyotr Prokopovich, chief of the National Bank of Belarus, announced that a "common currency might be introduced in 2007". This, however, failed to occur in 2007. The National Bank of the Republic of Belarus later replaced the dollar peg with a currency basket. In December 2022, the bank set the basket weighting to 60% for the Russian ruble, 30% for the US dollar, and 10% for the Chinese yuan, while plans to introduce a single shared currency were shelved in favor of national monetary policy coordination.

=== Citizenship and freedom of migration ===
Union State grants citizenship to citizens in both states meaning that every citizen of the Russian Federation and every citizen of the Republic of Belarus is at the same time a citizen of the Union with the guaranteed right to move and reside freely within the territory of the other party, allowing Belarusian citizens to travel freely in Russia and have the right to settle there to work or study, and vice versa including possession, use and disposal of property on the territory of another state. The Union State provides citizens of Russia and Belarus the right to work and permanently settle in either country without formal immigration procedures otherwise mandatory for foreign nationals. They retain their national passports and other identification papers.

On 11 January 2025, the bilateral agreement on mutual recognition of visas entered into force. It permits third-country nationals holding a valid visa issued by either Belarus or Russia to visit both countries and cross the internal land border through designated international checkpoints.

=== Military ===
On 10 February 2009, Russia and Belarus implemented the first stage of joint military officer training programs designed to integrate the military structures of the countries. This military collective is called the Regional Forces Group of Belarus and Russia (RGF). The goal of these operations is to ensure cohesive training, practice and implementation of military interests for the nations, and were aimed at strategic and battle training taking place in February and March 2009. Furthermore, the military doctrine of the Russian Federation provides that "an armed attack on the state-participant in the Union State, as well as all other actions involving the use of military force against it," should be deemed "an act of aggression against the Union State", authorizing Moscow to "take measures in response". On 6 December 2024, Russia and Belarus signed a treaty about mutual security guarantees. The treaty was ratified by Russia on 28 February 2025 and by Belarus on 4 March 2025. The accord entered into force on 13 March 2025.

=== Proposed symbols ===
Proposed flag of the Union State

Since the formation of the Union State in 1997, Belarus and Russia have thus far failed to institute any symbols or even a flag for the Union State. There have, however been several proposals for flags and coats of arms.

Two proposals have been made for the flag of the Union. In all cases, they are modifications to the flag of the Soviet Union, but representing the state (not communism). In both cases, two gold stars are placed in the canton of the red flag (to represent the two states of the Union).

A proposed coat of arms is a modification of the double-headed eagle holding the coats of arms of Russia and Belarus.

A song called "Sovereign Union of Nations" (Russian: Державный союз народов Derzhavny soyuz narodov, Belarusian: Дзяржаўны саюз народаў Dzyarzhauny sayuz narodau) has been proposed as the Union's unofficial anthem. The song, which was modified from the National Anthem of the Soviet Union, refers to a wider union of the two nations.

=== Value-added tax controversy ===
Belarus and Russia had been collecting a value-added tax (VAT), meant to finance the Union State, in the country of origin, but from 1 January 2005, VAT is collected in the country of destination, as in most other independent countries of the world. This change gave rise to a considerable degree of confusion and has disrupted many trade operations between Belarus and Russia. On 10 February 2005, private entrepreneurs in Belarus staged a one-day warning strike, protesting the new VAT scheme between the two countries and Lukashenko's economic policies.

=== Contemplated expansion ===
- Armenia: Several political parties including the Constitutional Rights Union, National Unity, and the Towards Russia Party have expressed their desire for the country to join the Union. In April 2025, the newly-elected Mayor of Gyumri from the Communist Party, Vardan Ghukasyan, advocated joining the Union State on the model of Belarus. In October 2025, Ghukasyan was arrested by Armenian law enforcement on bribery charges and subsequently charged with publicly calling for the renunciation of national sovereignty.
- Georgia
  - Abkhazia currently has observer status in parliamentary sessions. Expressed a desire to join the Russia-Belarus Union State, although neither is recognized by Belarus.
  - South Ossetia currently has observer status in parliamentary sessions. Also expressed a desire to join the Russia-Belarus Union State. The political party Iron advocates for a unified North and South Ossetia to join the Union State as an equal partner to Russia.
- Kazakhstan had expressed interest in forming a separate customs union with Russia and Belarus by 2010. This Customs Union was formed as planned at the beginning of 2010. Kazakhstan has mentioned that it may join the Union State after some time. In late May 2023, however, President Kassym-Jomart Tokayev declined an offer by President Alexander Lukashenko to join the union, referring to it as a "joke."
- Kyrgyzstan: As of June 2007, opposition in Kyrgyzstan, which has been locked in political turmoil, had initiated a nationwide referendum to join the union of Russia and Belarus.
- Moldova: In 2001, president of Moldova Vladimir Voronin announced right after his election that he had plans for Moldova to join the Union of Russia and Belarus. The coming to power of the Alliance for European Integration at the 2009 Moldovan elections has since shifted Moldovan interest towards the European Union.
  - Transnistria: in the Transnistrian referendum of 2006, the government said 97.2% of the population voted for the integration of the unrecognized state of Transnistria into Russia, which analysts say indicates a possibility that Transnistria might unilaterally ask to join the Union, once it is established. Already in spring 1998, 66.5% of Transnistrian voters supported joining the Union of Russia and Belarus in a non-binding referendum by the Transnistrian state. However, not being recognised by either member, this is unlikely to happen in the near future.
- Ukraine: In response to speculation about Ukraine joining the Union, then-president of Ukraine, Viktor Yanukovych, declared that Ukraine is an independent sovereign state and this is not something that can be questioned by anyone in the government. The issue is to be reconsidered in the new light of the Revolution of Dignity and the developments of the Euromaidan movement seeking for the integration into the European Union. During the term of office of the fifth President of Ukraine Petro Poroshenko, the Constitution of Ukraine in 2019 was amended to consolidate the irreversibility of Ukraine's course to join the European Union and NATO after the events of the Revolution of Dignity in 2014. In 2021, the sixth president of Ukraine, Volodymyr Zelenskyy, stated that the creation of a "true union state" between Belarus and Russia is a real danger for Ukraine. Russia invaded Ukraine in February 2022 in an escalation of the Russo-Ukrainian War that continues today.
  - Novorossiya: During the 2014 Russian military intervention in Ukraine, Deputy Prime Minister Rustam Temirgaliev of the Russian-annexed Republic of Crimea expressed the hope that southeastern Ukraine would form a "Ukrainian Federation" and join the Union State. However, only the self-proclaimed Donetsk People's Republic and Luhansk People's Republic broke away from Ukraine, and the confederate Novorossiya political project was frozen at the start of 2015.
- FR Yugoslavia/Serbia: On April 12, 1999, the Federal Assembly of the FR Yugoslavia passed the Decision on the accession of the FRY to the Union state of Russia and Belarus. The legal successor of that decision is the Republic of Serbia. In 2007, Speaker of Parliament Tomislav Nikolić said during a speech that he wished that Serbia would strengthen its ties with and eventually join the Union State rather than joining the European Union, but he resigned from his position less than a week later. Although Nikolić did eventually serve as President of Serbia from 2012–2017, Serbia had submitted a membership application to the EU in 2009 and had received full candidate status in March 2012, prior to his term.

=== Renewed interest ===
A clickable Euler diagram showing the relationships among various supranational organisations in the territory of the former Soviet Union

On 15 December 2006, talks over the Union State were intensifying. By January 2007, however, talks appeared to be stalled, as President Alexander Lukashenko of Belarus stated: "The Russian leadership is demanding that we join the Russian Federation—that's what is in the heads of the Russian leadership. I don't want to bury the sovereignty and independence of [Belarus]." He added: "From all the consultations and discussions, I have understood that we have different approaches and understandings of the building of a Union State", and opposed "the possibility of the incorporation into Russia [of Belarus]".

However, on 19 October 2007, Russian prime minister Viktor Zubkov announced that the budget of the Union State "will grow by no less than ten percent next year, and that growth will provide for worthy funding of our common projects." This has led to speculation that the Russian government have renewed their interest in the idea.

A meeting between President Lukashenko of Belarus, President Vladimir Putin of Russia and Union State Secretary Pavel Borodin was held in Minsk 13–14 December 2007. This meeting received a considerable amount of media attention and raised speculation that a Union State might indeed be the focus of a new initiative by both governments. Of primary interest was renewed discussion of the Union Parliament (which, although planned, was never actually realized) and a Union State Constitutional Act, an instrument which could strengthen the authority of the Union. According to State Secretary Borodin, five variants of this Act were discussed at the meeting, each of which would involve a 7 to 10 year transitional period in the Union's development. Trade and energy issues were also discussed.

On 27 May 2008, President Lukashenko, acting in his capacity as Chairman of the Supreme State Council named then Russian prime minister and current president Putin chairman of the Council of Ministers. This move raised speculation that the Union was about to undergo a significant political transformation. However, the most visible and arguably important official in the Union has been the State Secretary, who runs the Union State's day-to-day operations. In the same meeting, State Secretary Borodin announced that the 2009 Union State budget would total 6–7 billion roubles, an increase of over 2 billion roubles from 2008.

On 1 August 2011, Putin stated he supported a union of Russia, Belarus, and possibly South Ossetia. Belarusian foreign minister spokesman Andrei Savinykh rejected the idea, as did Dmitri Medojev, South Ossetia's ambassador to Moscow, who stated "Our people voted for independence in a referendum in 2006 and they do not relish the idea of becoming part of the Russian Federation."

Since 2015, focus on developing relations between former members of the Soviet Union is on continued development of the Eurasian Economic Union (EAEU), itself a further development of the Eurasian Customs Union established in 2010. It is modelled on the integration of the European Union and comprises 5 member states: Belarus, Russia, Kazakhstan, Armenia and Kyrgyzstan. Tajikistan has also expressed an interest in joining. However, the EAEU is only an economic union, and at present, political integration remains within the remit of the Union State.

Deeper economic integration is proposed in 2021 within current talks of member states. In November 2021, Russia and Belarus signed an agreement to provide for common policies on taxation, banking, industry, agriculture, and energy.

==== Russo-Ukrainian war ====
Following the 2022 Russian invasion of Ukraine, part of which was staged from Belarus' territory, Russia and Belarus came under sanctions and boycotts. On 3 March, Belarusian president Alexander Lukashenko said he stood fully behind Russian president Vladimir Putin's campaign in Ukraine as part of Belarus's longstanding commitment to the Union State with Russia. On 14 March, Russian prime minister Mikhail Mishustin met with Belarusian prime minister Roman Golovchenko in Moscow, telling reporters that they "coordinated measures to protect our economic security and the technological sovereignty of Russia and Belarus" and "consider it necessary to strengthen integration in the Union State". On 18 March, the Russian government announced that all restrictions on the movement of citizens between Russia and Belarus would be lifted. On 1 July 2022, Russian President Vladimir Putin announced that the "unification" process has been accelerated to alleviate the economic damage of the sanctions.

In October 2022, following the September 2022 mobilisation of reservists in Russia, a contingent of approximately 9,000 Russian soldiers arrived in Belarus. According to the Belarusian ministry of defence the purpose of this deployment was to create a "regional military grouping" of the Union State. In the same month it was announced that Russian air forces were patrolling the borders of the Union State in Belarus.

==== 2023 nuclear deterrence ====
In an interview aired by Russia's state television in late May 2023, Lukashenko stated that other countries who were willing to join the Union State would be given nuclear weapons: "If someone is worried ... (then) it is very simple: join in the Union State of Belarus and Russia. That's all: there will be nuclear weapons for everyone." This was just a few days after he had confirmed that the movement of some of Russia's tactical nuclear weapons to Belarus had begun and the Russian defence minister had said he was signing documents concerning the procedure for storing tactical nuclear weapons in Belarus, the plan for which had first been announced by Putin in March.

==== 25th anniversary of the Treaty on the Creation of the Union State ====
On 6 December 2024, coinciding with the 25th anniversary of the Treaty on the Creation of the Union State, signed on December 9, 1999, at a meeting of the Supreme State Council of the Union State, the Russian president Vladimir Putin and his Belarusian counterpart Alexander Lukashenko expanded the defense and security cooperation between the two countries by signing the Russia-Belarus Treaty on security guarantees within the Union State.

==== Abolition of roaming charges ====
Effective 1 March 2025, Belarus and Russia abolished mobile roaming surcharges under a "comfortable tariffs" regime, providing subscribers with guaranteed quotas of monthly voice minutes and mobile data at domestic rates when in the other country.

== See also ==
- Commonwealth of Independent States
- Continental union
- 2007 Russia–Belarus energy dispute
- Post-Soviet states
- Soviet Union
- New Union Treaty
- Belarus–Russia relations
- Eurasian Economic Union
- Common Travel Area, an arrangement allowing for relatively open borders between the United Kingdom and Ireland
- Unionism in Ireland
- 1950 Indo-Nepal Treaty of Peace and Friendship
- European Single Market
- Trans-Tasman Travel Arrangement

== Sources ==
- Kembayev, Zhenis (3 February 2009). Legal Aspects of the Regional Integration Processes in the Post-Soviet Area. Springer Science & Business Media. ISBN 978-3-540-87652-6.
