= Land mines in Nagorno-Karabakh =

First Nagorno-Karabakh War

Land mine situation in Nagorno-Karabakh
- HALO Trust deminers clearing anti-tank mines
Date	1991–present
Location	Nagorno-Karabakh, Armenia, and Azerbaijan
Result	Thousands of mines laid by both sides. Till present mines still result in casualties and prevent many hectares of agricultural land from being cultivated

Belligerents
Artsakh, Armenia	Azerbaijan

Casualties and losses
~123–180 dead, ~300–507 injured	? ?

The region of Nagorno-Karabakh and areas around it are considered to be some of the most heavily mined regions of the former Soviet Union. Mines were laid from the early 1990s by both Azerbaijani and Armenian forces during and after the First Nagorno-Karabakh War. The worst-affected areas are along the fortified former contact line between Azerbaijani and Armenian forces, in particular in the districts of Aghdam, Fuzuli and Jabrayil. According to military experts from both Azerbaijan and Armenia, the ground in those areas is covered with "carpets of land mines." The region has the highest per capita rate in the world of accidents due to unexploded ordnance.

== Production, stockpiling and use ==
Soviet PMN-2 - the most common AP mine in Karabakh.

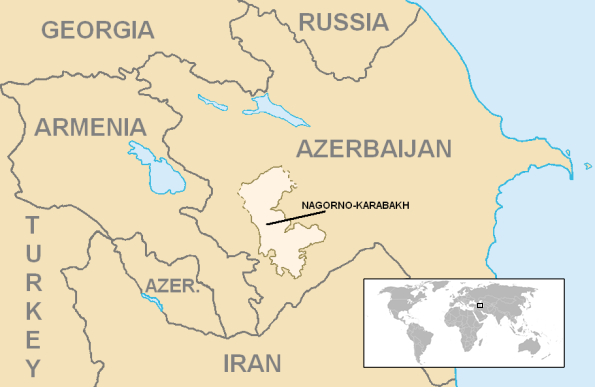
Location of Nagorno-Karabakh

Artsakh has stated that it has never produced or exported mines, and has not purchased new mines since 1995; its mine stockpile consists of mines left over from the former Soviet Union (PMN, PMN-2, POMZ-2, OZM-72, TM-57 and TM-62 mines).

In 2013, the military forces of Nagorno-Karabakh reported they planted more anti-personnel mines along the Armenian-Azerbaijani line of contact, east and north of disputed area.

== Victims ==
It is impossible to give the exact number of people injured or killed in Nagorno-Karabakh from landmines because of a lack of any records during the war itself, as well as no complete information available up until 2000. According to the Artsakh Ministry of Health, between June 1993 and May 1999 the number of victims of explosions, including landmines, was 687 (180 killed and 507 injured). Since the cease-fire in 1994 to the end of 2004, 326 mine/UXO casualties were reported, including at least 77 people injured since 2000. As of 2019, the Red Cross mission in Nagorno-Karabakh had registered 747 cases of landmine victims, of which 59% were civilians.

An estimated 69,000 residents in 60 villages in Armenia are afflicted by the problem.

After the 2020 Nagorno-Karabakh ceasefire agreement, seven Azerbaijani troops and 18 civilians have died and more than 100 have been wounded by land mines in the area of Nagorno-Karabakh and surrounding districts.

=== ICBL perspective ===
According to Landmine Monitor in 2003, 21 new mine and UXO casualties were recorded in Nagorno-Karabakh, including nine people killed and twelve people injured. Casualties increased significantly in the first six months of 2004, with 30 new mine/UXO casualties recorded; eleven people were killed and nineteen injured, including three children. New landmine and UXO casualties had been decreasing since the ceasefire in 1994. In 1995, there were 86 casualties, 64 in 1996, 25 in 1997, 16 in 1998, and 30 in 1999. There were fourteen casualties (five killed and nine injured) in 2000, nineteen casualties (four killed and fifteen injured) in 2001, and seventeen casualties (all injured) in 2002. According to HALO, the increasing casualty numbers are the result of record harvests produced in recent years and a greater investment in agriculture. As farmers try to increase their agricultural boundaries, more suspected mined areas are being ploughed—despite advice from HALO and the government, and the presence of danger mine signs. Most incidents involve antivehicle mines. The number of annual incidents per capita in Nagorno-Karabakh is far higher than other heavily mine-affected countries such as Cambodia or Afghanistan. The thirty new casualties in 2004 represent 2.5 people for every 10,000 inhabitants. In 2004, 34 new mine/UXO casualties, including ten people killed and 24 injured, were reported in 25 incidents; another nine people were involved in the incidents but did not suffer physical injuries. At least three of the casualties were children. This represents a further significant increase from the 21 new mine/UXO casualties recorded in 2003. Of the 25 incidents in 2004, fourteen were caused by antivehicle mines, seven by antipersonnel mines and four by UXO. In 2004, one deminer was injured during mine clearance operations. In 2005, one person was killed and three people were injured in five mine/UXO incidents to June; one other person did not suffer physical injuries.

This year, we have cleared almost entirely the territory of the village Shurnukh in the Syunik region [in southern Armenia],” said Movsisian. “Before they withdrew from the village, the Azerbaijanis randomly mined arable lands, gardens and some of the forests. We got the job fully done in the village and cleared 215,000 square metres. Locals can now cultivate their land without fear

=== UN perspective ===
The United Nations Development Program (UNDP) says 123 people have been killed and over 300 injured by landmines near the disputed enclave of Nagorno-Karabakh since a 1994 truce ended a six-year conflict between ethnic Armenian and Azerbaijani forces.

== Survey and clearance ==
=== Survey ===
The HALO Trust is the only agency that conducts minefield survey, mapping and marking of Nagorno-Karabakh. Since 2000, HALO has surveyed more than 10 km^{2} (2,470 acres) of land, and this survey was ongoing in 2005. HALO reports that it marks all the suspect areas it surveys with “Danger Mines!” signs. Post-clearance survey is carried out on a case study basis on some sites, as most areas are handed over and used almost immediately after they have been cleared.

There is no information on the number of mines laid along the current border-line between Karabakh and Azerbaijan, but it is common knowledge that mines were being laid by both sides along the border during several years after the end of the conflict. It is estimated that far greater mine clearance capacities will be required when the peace agreement is signed between Azerbaijan and Armenia

=== Clearance ===
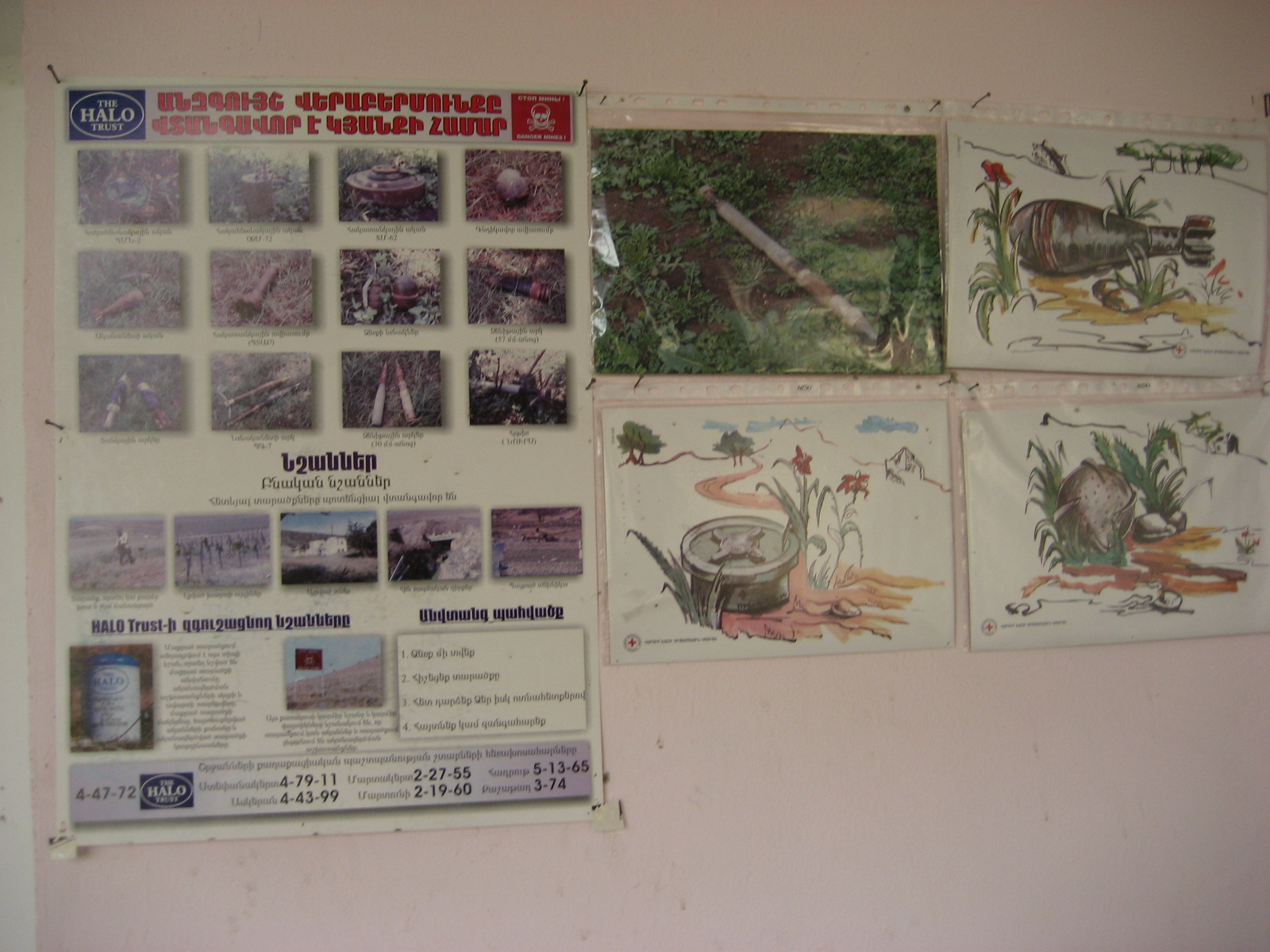
School posters in Karabakh educating children on mines and UXO

The Artsakh Defense Army had an engineering battalion that is involved in the clearance of minefields of strategic importance.

The HALO Trust is the only other organisation conducting demining in Nagorno-Karabakh. In 1995 and 1996 HALO conducted an 18-month-long programme in Karabakh that established a mine clearance capacity for the local authorities. This included a survey of the region and the equipping and training of deminers. The teams operated without assistance for three years and whilst they successfully cleared hundreds of mines, their equipment had degraded and accurate records of clearance had not been kept for some time.

HALO resumed mine clearance in Karabakh in 2000 with a view to reinforcing capacity through a project of re-equipment, providing additional training and by establishing a mine action centre (MAC). The MAC collates information concerning mines, UXO and safe routes, and disseminates it to all who require it, in particular other NGOs and international humanitarian bodies operating in Karabakh. Mine clearance in Karabakh by the HALO Trust continues to the present day. According to the Landmine Monitor, in 2004 the HALO Trust cleared 3.6 square kilometers of affected land through manual and mechanical demining, and a further 450,000 square meters in 2005 through April. It concentrated clearance on farmland, and re-focused mine risk education on adults, in view of mine casualties rising as agricultural production increased. By the end of 2004, ICRC had provided safe play areas for children in 27 villages.

From 2000 to 2003, HALO cleared 2,691,097 m^{2} (665 acres) of affected land manually, cleared 45,414,190 m^{2} (11,222 acres) by battle area clearance, surveyed 7,767,500 m^{2} (1,919 acres), and destroyed 2,167 antipersonnel mines, 977 anti-vehicle mines and 8,710 items of UXO.

In 2004, HALO cleared 3,580,289 square meters of affected land through manual and mechanical demining, destroying in the process 675 antipersonnel mines, 340 anti vehicle mines, 2,040 UXO, 2,352 items of stray ammunition and a large quantity of small arms ammunition. Types of land cleared were primarily agricultural (1,519,953 m^{2} (376 acres)), access routes (11,003,537 m^{2} (248 acres)), major infrastructure (139,415 m^{2} (34 acres)), community infrastructure (33,900 m^{2} (8.4 acres)) and other (883,484 m^{2} (218 acres)). This represents an increase on 2003, when HALO cleared 2,302,761 m^{2} (569 acres). Also in 2004, the Engineering Service of the Army and the Department of Emergency Situations destroyed 48 antipersonnel landmines, 37 anti-vehicle land mines, 447 UXO and 5,141 items of small caliber explosive ordnance.

As of 2011, most of the money to pay for HALO's Karabakh project came from the United States government.

In 2015, a private family foundation based in the US pledged up to $4M in matched funding to aid an attempt to clear Karabakh by 2020.

In March 2021 the ANAMA and the UNDP signed cooperation agreement to clear the Nagorno-Karabakh conflict zone from mines. This collaboration is not new; during the last 20 years, ANAMA and the UNDP have collaboratively destroyed over 800,000 mines and other explosive devices.

== Reactions to the HALO Trust activities ==
=== Azerbaijan ===
Azerbaijan has been vehemently against the demining activities by the Halo Trust in disputed territory of Nagorno-Karabakh. Saying that it "perpetuates and encourages Armenian forces’ occupation of Azerbaijani territory." In July 2011 Azerbaijani government blacklisted and banned the organization from Azerbaijan in protest for its mine clearing operation in disputed territory of Nagorno-Karabakh. Additionally Azerbaijan refused to agree to extend the mandate of the OSCE office in Yerevan unless the office ended its humanitarian demining-related activities. US Minsk Group ex Co-chair Carey Cavanaugh in October 2017 commented regarding Azerbaijan's efforts to shut down the Halo Trust:

I remember when I was co-chair visiting the HALO Trust and looking at the great work they were doing with demining in this region. If Azerbaijan’s hope is all the land comes back to Azerbaijan, why would you want landmines in it? The day you get it back, you want no mines in it. The day whatever solution is brokered between the parties with the support of OSCE, you want no landmines in it. So why not cooperate on those civil steps to remove those?

— Averting All-Out War in Nagorno-Karabakh: The Role of the U.S. and OSCE (page 16)

=== Armenia and Nagorno-Karabakh ===
Representative of the leader of Nagorno-Karabakh on special assignments Boris Avagyan claimed that HALO Trust handed over minefield maps to Turkish special services, which, in his opinion, helped Azerbaijan’s successful military operations during the second Karabakh war in the fall of 2020. Ayvagyan claimed that under the pretext of studying dangerous areas, this organization carried out reconnaissance work throughout the territory of Nagorno-Karabakh. Opposition MP Naira Zohrabyan supported these claims. HALO Trust said the accusation was "an absolute lie".

== After 2020 Nagorno-Karabakh war ==
On November 23, 2020, due to a landmine explosion in Madagiz, four members of the Artsakh Emergency Ministry, and one Russian peacekeeper were injured. Additionally, one soldier of the Azerbaijan Armed Forces was killed. In a separate incident on April 24, 2021, a vehicle of the Russian peacekeeping contingent struck an anti-tank mine, injuring two Russian peacekeepers moderately. The 2022-2023 blockade of Artsakh has made it more difficult for HALO trust members to conduct their work.

On June 4, 2021, 3 Azerbaijani civilians, including two journalists, died as a result of a mine explosion in the Kalbajar region. On 12 June 2021, Armenia handed over minefield maps in the formerly occupied Agdam region to Azerbaijan in exchange for the extradition of 15 Armenian POWs, who were supposed to have been extradited many months ago per the 2020 Nagorno-Karabakh ceasefire agreement, who were detained in Azerbaijan despite calls from a number of countries and organizations for their release. The acting Armenian Prime Minister, Nikol Pashinyan, said in a speech broadcast on his Facebook on 13 June 2021. “We have handed over minefield maps but this is a tiny part of the maps that we have,” Pashinyan noted. Pashinyan also stated that he is ready to hand over all the minefield maps to Azerbaijan in return for all the Armenian POWs, that are still being held in Azerbaijan in breach of the Point 9 of the ceasefire agreement and the Geneva converntion.

By June 2021, Azerbaijan reported seven of its soldiers, and twenty of its civilians had died in mine explosions since the conclusion of the 2020 war.

British-made mine flail vehicles have been purchased and brought to the area to accelerate the demining of the area.

On July 3, 2021 Azerbaijan handed over 15 detained Armenian soldiers in exchange for maps detailing the location of around 92,000 anti-tank and anti-personnel mines in the formerly occupied Fizuli and Zangilan districts. Released soldiers were all from Shirak region in Armenia, detained after the ceasefire. Azerbaijan's President Ilham Aliyev claimed on 14 August 2021 that the accuracy of the maps provided by Armenia was only 25 percent.

A statement released after 14 December 2021 trilateral meeting between Ilham Aliyev, Nikol Pashinyan and Charles Michel in Brussels stressed the importance of resolving key humanitarian issues, while stating that “all remaining mine-maps” had been handed over by Armenia.

== See also ==
- Demining
- Improvised explosive device
- Land mine situation in Chechnya
