= 2023 Yerevan City Council election =

- 17 September 2023
- All 65 seats to Yerevan City Council; 33 seats needed for a majority
- Turnout: 28.43%
Party	Leader	Vote %	Seats	+/–
Civil Contract	Tigran Avinyan	32.57	24	−33
National Progress	Hayk Marutyan	18.89	14	New
Mother Armenia	Andranik Tevanyan	15.43	12	New
Hanrapetutyun	Artak Zeynalyan	11.32	8	+5
Public Voice	Vardan Ghukasyan	9.68	7	New
This lists parties that won seats. See the complete results below.
Results in administrative districts
Mayor before	Mayor after
Tigran Avinyan (Acting, de facto); Civil Contract	Tigran Avinyan; Civil Contract

Yerevan City Council elections were held on 17 September 2023. The Yerevan City Council comprises 65 members, including the mayor and the first deputy mayor, elected through a proportional electoral system. City Council members are elected for a five-year term.

The elections had the lowest turnout in the history of Yerevan. Civil Contract won 24 seats with 32.60 % of the votes, far short of the required 40% majority to have their leader automatically elected mayor, and their former ally Hanrapetutyun won 8. Together the two thus have 32 seats out of 65, one short of a majority otherwise required by the council to elect a mayor, while opposition parties held the other 33 seats. This resulted into Yerevan City Council being hung and it was unclear who would be the next mayor of Yerevan after the announcement of the preliminary results.

== Background ==
=== 2021 parliamentary election ===
After six weeks of war with Azerbaijan, on 9 November 2020 prime minister Nikol Pashinyan, president of Azerbaijan Ilham Aliyev and Russian president Vladimir Putin reached and signed a ceasefire agreement. Following the announcement of this deal, violent protests erupted in Yerevan. The National Assembly was stormed and its speaker Ararat Mirzoyan was beaten by an angry mob.

Pashinyan faced continuous calls for his resignation and mass rallies calling for him to step down. On 25 February 2021, the Chief of the General Staff of the Armenian Armed Forces Onik Gasparyan and more than 40 other top-ranking generals demanded Pashinyan's resignation, which Pashinyan described as a coup attempt, causing a political crisis that ended with Gasparyan's dismissal. On 25 April 2021, Pashinyan announced his formal resignation, prompting the dissolution of the National Assembly and the call for snap elections on 20 June of that year.

Following the snap elections, Pashinyan was re-elected to a second term, with Civil Contract receiving 54% of the vote and 71 seats, a majority in the 107-seat parliament. The opposition Armenia Alliance, finished second with 29 seats, while the I Have Honor Alliance won 7 seats. The opposition claimed there had been electoral fraud during the elections, while the OSCE assessed the election as meeting international standards and described it as; "marred by increasingly inflammatory rhetoric" but was "positive overall."

=== Importance of city council election ===
More than one-third of Armenia's electorate (824,250) lives in Yerevan, the capital city, making this the largest local election in Armenia. Yerevan's size and political influence further emphasized this election's importance, which many observers saw as a midterm assessment of Prime Minister Nikol Pashinyan and his ruling party ahead of the next parliamentary elections to be held in 2026. In addition, the election took place in a volatile political environment, exacerbated by Armenia's conflict with Azerbaijan over Nagorno-Karabakh. CivilNet Chief Karen Harutyunyan described the importance of the elections as; "The Yerevan election will be an important test of confidence for Pashinyan, who claims to have the people's full mandate to solve the Artsakh problem at any cost. This will also be a test for Armenia's fledgling democracy."

== Campaign ==
The ruling party's mayoral candidate is Tigran Avinyan, who has been a deputy mayor since 2022. He has served as de facto acting mayor since Hracha Sargsyan's resignation in March 2023 due to low approval ratings, and has thus been in the spotlight as the primary implementer of reforms in the city and had the chance to garner support among voters. Avinyan's appointment was controversial as the normal process to replace Sargsyan was circumvented. The Electoral Code had required a special session of city council be called within one month to fill the vacancy. After Sargsyan resigned, a special session was called for April 11. However, when the day came, none of the city councilors except for Deputy Mayor Levon Hovhannisyan, who was already serving as the interim Acting Mayor showed up. Without a quorum, Hovhannisyan announced that the session was not in order and adjourned. Since that date, city council has continued to meet for regular sessions but never again placed the item of electing a new mayor on the agenda. Hovhannisyan has continued as interim Acting Mayor, while observers stated Tigran Avinyan is the one in charge. This was because the city council could not officially appoint Avinyan as the new mayor as he was not on the list of candidates in 2018.

Avinyan's primary challenger was opposition candidate and former mayor Hayk Marutyan. Marutyan, the former mayoral candidate of the My Step Alliance, was elected mayor in a victory following the September 2018 Yerevan City Council election with the backing of Civil Contract and its leader Nikol Pashinyan, who had come to power in the Velvet revolution five months earlier. Marutyan left Civil Contract in late 2020, after the Second Karabakh War. Ruling party council members removed him a year later, after he delivered a litany of accusations against the ruling elite, including misappropriating funds and issuing illegal construction permits. After he left office, he returned to comedy, performing a stand-up routine titled "The Mayor" about his experience in power and his problems with the ruling team. He ran atop the list of the National Progress party which includes several current and former city council members who supported him after he split from the ruling party. Marutyan was not associated with the ruling party's traditional main rivals, the Republican Party (which ruled Armenia from 1998 to 2018) and its allies, who have failed to mount a serious challenge to Civil Contract in the postwar era largely because of corruption allegations lingering from their time in power.

The Armenia Alliance boycotted the elections, saying the elections were not significant given the grave security challenges facing Armenia as well as Nagorno-Karabakh. In response, Andranik Tevanyan, an Armenia Alliance parliamentarian, disagreed with the boycott and resigned from the National Assembly, forming a new electoral bloc called the Mother Armenia Alliance to run for mayor. He described his decision to run as "an opposition victory in Yerevan would pave the way for regime change in the country". As response to the formation of Mother Armenia, the Armenia Alliance refrained from fielding candidates and together with former president Robert Kocharyan and the Armenian Revolutionary Federation, endorsed the Mother Armenia Alliance. Meanwhile, the Apricot Country Party and the Intellectual Armenia Party joined the Mother Armenia Alliance, as did one member from the National Democratic Union.

The Armenian Revolutionary Federation announced it would not field a separate list of candidates and would endorse parties opposing Civil Contract.

Mane Tandilyan, the former Armenian Minister of Labor and Social Affairs and a candidate of the Country of Living party, stated the election is important as it is the first step to achieve regime change in Armenia.

In April 2023, three members of the Public Voice Party were arrested and public criminal prosecution was initiated against Vardan Ghukasyan and Artak Galstyan, the main figureheads of the party, for committing extortion within the group. Despite on-going criminal investigations, the party did ultimately nominate Artak Galstyan as its mayoral candidate in the run up to the elections. The party also announced that members of the Alliance of Progressive Centrists would be listed on their ballot.

In June 2023, the European Party of Armenia and the Social Democrat Hunchakian Party formed an electoral alliance, known as Dignified Yerevan. The alliance nominated Karen Sargsyan as its candidate for the position of Mayor of Yerevan. The alliance, however, dissolved in August 2023 prior to the election. The European Party of Armenia later confirmed that they would be participating in the elections independently and nominated party leader Tigran Khzmalyan as their mayoral candidate.

== Conduct ==
=== Pre-election campaign controversies ===
The Human Rights Defender's Office monitored the electoral process during the election campaign. A working group was established, which studied "about 500 publications in media and social networks about alleged violations of electoral law". According to the results of the monitoring, the alleged violations were directed at the ruling party Civil Contract, with abuse of administrative resources, attempts to financially interest people to participate in pre-election meetings, cases of coercion to participate in them, and cases of "obstructing the activities of journalists and observers". The Ombudsman's office reports that all alleged violations were reported to the Prosecutor General's Office, the Ministry of Internal Affairs, Yerevan Mayor's Office, and other bodies responsible for the elections.

Thousands of people marched through Yerevan in the Civil Contract's final campaign rally led by Avinyan, as well as Pashinyan and members of his government and political team. Two local election-monitoring groups reported that they had received numerous complaints that people working for local government bodies, schools and other public entities were ordered by their superiors to attend the rally. Civil Contract in response denied reports that it is forced public sector employees to attend election campaign. Avinyan specifically dismissed a video suggesting that entire staffs of schools, kindergartens, and local government bodies participated in one such rally that was held in the city's Nor Nork district.

=== Election day ===
After the elections, the Head of the Central Election Commission Vahagn Hovakimyan said that "the election campaign was correct and calm", there were not as many problems as usual. "Moreover, we are not talking about recorded violations, but about alarm signals. 70-80% of the signals we received were false, that is, their investigation did not reveal any violations," he emphasized. He also briefly touched upon the record low turnout. He stated: 'I can say that the dynamics of participation in the last elections have gone down'.

Hovakimyan, a former MP from the Prime Minister's Civil Contract, played down the significance of the low turnout. 'As a person who has professional knowledge of electoral processes, I can say that free and democratic elections have a low level of participation all over the world', he said. Tigran Avinyan, also suggested the low turnout was a result of the vote being clean after casting his ballot on Sunday.

A nine-member election observation delegation from the Council of Europe observed 113 randomly selected polling stations in all districts of Yerevan from opening until closing and counting. The observation team had held meetings with key electoral stakeholders and representatives of the diplomatic corps, the media, NGOs as well as candidates of parties running in the elections before the elections. Overall, the delegation assessed the elections as meeting international standards, and reported a calm, peaceful and well-managed election day without major incidents or anomalies. The delegation noted that, with the support of representatives of the Central Election Commission (CEC), voter authentication devices and cameras functioned seamlessly throughout the voting day, reducing opportunities for fraud and reinforcing the trust of voters in the electoral process. It also welcomed the change of ballot papers, which contributed to increase readability and reduced the possibility of carousel voting.

== Results ==
The Central Election Commission (CEC) reported that 28.43 percent of Yerevan's 824,250 eligible voters cast ballots, the lowest figure ever recorded in the city. Some senior members of the opposition blocs portrayed the low turnout and the ruling party's worse-than-expected performance as a massive setback for Pashinyan. They claimed that the election outcome will precipitate his downfall.

The preliminary result gave ruling party Civil Contract led by Avinyan, 24 of 65 seats on the council, with 33% of the vote, a loss of its absolute majority and a decline from the previous elections in 2018, when Hayk Marutyan led the party's list, winning 81% of the vote. National Progress, led by former mayor Marutyan came in second place with 14 seats and 19% of the vote. The Mother Armenia Alliance, led by Andranik Tevanyan, received 15% of the vote and eight seats. Hanrapetutyun, a former coalition partner of Civil Contract founded by Aram Sargsyan, and led by Artak Zeynalyan, received 11% and eight seats. Public Voice, founded by Vardan Ghukasyan, a popular social media influencer and wanted by the Armenian police since May received 10% of the vote and seven seats.

Party	Votes	%	Seats
Civil Contract	75,463	32.60	24
National Progress Party of Armenia	43,765	18.91	14
Mother Armenia Alliance	35,739	15.44	12
Hanrapetutyun Party	26,236	11.33	8
Public Voice Party	22,431	9.69	7
Country of Living	8,425	3.64	0
Bright Armenia	4,174	1.80	0
Victory Party	3,959	1.71	0
Fair Armenia Party	2,595	1.12	0
European Party of Armenia	2,572	1.11	0
Democratic Consolidation Party	2,348	1.01	0
Strength of the Fatherland	1,706	0.74	0
United Armenia Party	1,282	0.55	0
For Social Justice	780	0.34	0
Total	231,475	100.00	65
Registered voters/turnout	824,316	–	
Source: News.am

== Aftermath ==
Civil Contract and former ally Hanrapetutyun together got 32 seats out of 65, one short of a majority, while opposition parties held the other 33 seats. This resulted in the Yerevan City Council being hung and it was unclear who would be the next mayor of Yerevan after the announcement of the preliminary results.

On 18 September, leader of Public Voice Vardan Ghukasyan appealed to National Progress leader Hayk Marutyan and Mother Armenia Alliance leader Andranik Tevanyan. Combined, the three would have a majority on the council and be able to select the next mayor. Ghukasyan said he did not object to either Marutyan or Tevanyan as mayor. He also speculated that Hanrapetutyun whose mayoral candidate Zeynalyan served as Minister of Justice in 2018–2019 for Nikol Pashinyan, would most likely side with Civil Contract. Tevanyan said the outcome of the Yerevan City Council elections confirmed that Prime Minister Nikol Pashinyan's Civil Contract party "does not enjoy public trust." Pashinyan and Tigran Avinian did not personally comment on the election outcome, reinforcing a widely held belief that it was a serious setback which could have repercussions for the prime minister's political future.

However, Hayk Grigoryan, the second on the list of National Progress, stated he had doubt in an opposition coalition forming, as he believed 'the only possible' coalition possible would be between Civil Contract and Hanrapetutyun. Tevanyan accused the authorities of planning to recount the votes at all 475 polling stations and through falsifications achieve revision of the election results to grab one more seat that would give them a majority (presumably in coalition with Hanrapetutyun party) and enable them to elect their candidate as mayor of Yerevan. He called on citizens to be ready for protests.

The new city council held its inaugural session on 10 October 2023. Tigran Avinyan was elected as Mayor of Yerevan. Only 37 city councilors participated in the voting. Avinyan received 32 votes in favor and 5 against. The Mother Armenia Alliance and National Progress party boycotted the session. Under Armenian law, the council would have been dissolved and new elections re-held if it had failed to elect a mayor within two weeks.

=== Analysis ===
EVN Report reported in the aftermath of the results, Yerevan had become the most pluralistic political environment in Eurasia, with five political parties entering the City Council of Yerevan, and no single party having majority dominance. It categorized the five parties as belonging in three different spheres, three liberal parties post-revolution (Civil Contract, National Progress and Hanrapetutyun), one illiberal party pre-revolution (Mother Armenia Alliance), and one neutral party (Public Voice). It further added the elections showed a crucial departure from the narrative that had shaped Armenia's political culture for the last five years: the polarization between the pre-revolution and post-revolution political forces. It stated the elections had reduced the pre-revolution forces into electoral irrelevance, as the post-revolution factions developed a new course of politics in Armenia. It further added the political sophistication of Armenian society when it comes to electoral preferences, but it also allows for a more nuanced understanding of Armenia's democratic trajectory and depolarization. It concluded, the elections displayed a robust growth in pluralism, while it also introduced the concerns of low turnout and the specter that is haunting most democratic systems, voter apathy.

=== Azerbaijani offensive in Nagorno-Karabakh ===
On 19 September 2023, two days after the Yerevan City Council elections, Azerbaijani forces launched another attack on the self-declared breakaway state of Artsakh. The attacks occurred in the midst of an escalating crisis caused by Azerbaijan blockading the Republic of Artsakh, which has resulted in significant scarcities of essential supplies such as food, medicine, and other goods in the affected region. Hundreds of protesters gathered for a rally outside government buildings in the capital Yerevan denouncing Pashinyan as being soft on Azerbaijan and weak in Nagorno-Karabakh, with some calling for a coup d'état and removal of Pashinyan from power. Pashinyan denounced such calls stating that "We must not allow certain people, certain forces to deal a blow to the Armenian state."

Several members-elect of the City Council participated in protests outside the Russian embassy in Yerevan against Russia's inaction in the conflict.

== See also ==
- Politics of Armenia
