= National Unity (Armenia) =

- Leader: Vacant
- Founded: 1997
- Headquarters: Yerevan
- Membership: 46,700
- Ideology: Conservatism; Russophilia; Pro-CIS
- National Assembly: 0 / 107

Website
- www.amiab.am/hy/

National Unity (Armenian: Ազգային միաբանություն, romanized: Azgayin Miabanutyun) is a conservative political party in Armenia. It was founded and led by Artashes Geghamyan from 1997 until his death in 2024.

== History ==
In the parliamentary election held on 25 May 2003, the party won 8.8% of the popular vote and 9 out of 131 seats in the National Assembly of Armenia. In the 2003 presidential election, Geghamyan received 17.54% of the vote in the first round, but was eliminated prior to the second round of voting. In the 2007 parliamentary election, the party did not win any seats, receiving a popular vote of 3.69%. The party has not participated in any parliamentary elections since 2007.

In the February 2008 presidential election, Geghamyan, running again as the National Unity Party's candidate, placed seventh with 0.46% of the vote according to final official results.

Following the 2020–2021 Armenian protests, the party endorsed the "New Union" political alliance of the Voice of the Nation Party, the Towards Russia Party, and the Constitutional Rights Union. Geghamyan attended a meeting of the alliance. Geghamyan has also been very critical of Prime Minister Nikol Pashinyan, accusing the Prime Minister of being ruled by George Soros and Western interests.

== Ideology ==
The party advocates for strengthening the Armenian economy, protecting minority rights, deepening European integration while maintaining close relations with other Commonwealth of Independent States members, especially with Russia. The party also believes in keeping Armenia within the Collective Security Treaty Organization and the Eurasian Economic Union but also fostering deeper relations with the United States and NATO. However, the party is against any NATO peacekeepers being deployed in Armenia.

The party additionally believes in establishing peace with Armenia's neighbours and peacefully resolving the Nagorno-Karabakh conflict.

In May 2021, the party supported the idea of Armenia joining the Belarus-Russia Union State.

== See also ==
- Politics of Armenia
- Programs of political parties in Armenia
