= Public Voice Party =

Public Voice Party Հանրային ձայն կուսակցություն
- Leader: Artak Galstyan
- Founded: 2022
- Headquarters: Yerevan
- Ideology: United Armenia; Armenian nationalism
- Political position: Left-wing
- National Assembly: 0 / 107
- Yerevan City Council: 7 / 65

Website
- hanrayindzayn.com

The Public Voice Party (Armenian: Հանրային ձայն կուսակցություն, romanized: Hanrayin dzayn kusakts’ut’yun) is an Armenian political party. It was founded in 2022 and is currently led by Artak Galstyan.

== History ==
The Public Voice party was established on 6 August 2022 and Vardan Ghukasyan was unanimously elected as the party's chairman during a party congress held in Yerevan. Ghukasyan later served as the honorary chairman of the party as Artak Galstyan was elected chairman. The party announced intentions to form political cooperation with the Alliance Party. The party does not currently maintain any representation in the National Assembly.

On 18 November 2022, the headquarters of the party were broken into and splashed with white paint.

In April 2023, three members of the party were arrested and public criminal prosecution was initiated against Vardan Ghukasyan and Artak Galstyan, the main figureheads of the party, for committing extortion within the group. Artak Galstyan, the chairman of the Public Voice board, was set to participate in mayoral elections for the city of Yerevan. Despite on-going criminal investigations, the party did ultimately nominate Artak Galstyan as its mayoral candidate in the run up to the 2023 Yerevan City Council election. The party also included members of the Alliance of Progressive Centrists on their ballot. Following the election, the party won 9.68% of the vote and gained 7 seats in the Yerevan City Council.

On 19 January 2024, Vardan Ghukasyan was expelled from the party. Ghukasyan announced the creation of a new political party named "Democracy, Law, and Discipline" and encouraged Public Voice party members to join his party.

== Ideology ==
The party believes in uniting Artsakh with Armenia, increasing security of the country, tackling corruption, improving social justice and the rule of law, and protecting rights of national minorities. The party also supports strengthening democratic institutions in the country, implementing electoral reform, and supporting the economy.

== See also ==
- Programs of political parties in Armenia
