= Moral Values Party =

Moral Values Party Բարոյական արժեքներ
- Abbreviation: BAK
- Leader: Armen Meliksetyan
- Founded: 2022
- Headquarters: Yerevan
- National Assembly: 0 / 107

Website
- bak-arm.com

Moral Values Party (Armenian: Բարոյական արժեքներ, romanized: Baroyakan arzhek’ner) is an Armenian political party. It was founded in 2022 and is currently led by Armen Meliksetyan.

== History ==
The Moral Values Party held a founding congress on 15 February 2021 in Yerevan. The party was officially registered on 22 February 2022. The party has not participated in any elections in Armenia. It does not maintain any representation in the National Assembly and currently acts as an extra-parliamentary force.

Party members had initially confirmed that the party is neither pro-government nor oppositional, but that they were not satisfied with prime minister Nikol Pashinyan's policies following the 2018 Armenian revolution. On 22 January 2021, Meliksetyan stated, "We ourselves were supporters of the revolution, now we see that there are movements divided into several camps and we aim to bring our views, our vision, because we feel that our voice is not reaching a place". However, in 2023, Armen Meliksetyan posted a photo alongside Pashinyan on his social media. The party announced that they would be participating in the 2023 Yerevan City Council election, but ultimately did not participate.

== See also ==
- Programs of political parties in Armenia
