= Apricot Country Party =

Apricot Country Party Երկիր ծիրանի կուսակցություն
- Leader: Zaruhi Postanjyan
- Founded: 15 March 2017
- Headquarters: Yerevan
- Ideology: Liberalism; Progressivism; Pro-Europeanism
- Political position: Centre
- National affiliation: Homeland Salvation Movement (2020-2021)
- Slogan: "Towards Ararat"
- National Assembly: 0 / 107

Website
- yerkirtsirani.am

The Apricot Country Party (Armenian: Երկիր ծիրանի կուսակցություն, romanized: Yerkir tsirani kusakts’ut’yun), also known as Yerkir Tsirani, is a political party in Armenia.

== History ==
The party was established in March 2017, prior to the 2017 Yerevan City Council election. Party leader Zaruhi Postanjyan, a former member of the Heritage party, was nominated to run for Mayor of Yerevan. Following the election, Postanjyan came in third place.

On 9 November 2020, the party signed a joint declaration with the other member parties of the Homeland Salvation Movement calling on Prime Minister Nikol Pashinyan to resign during the 2020–2021 Armenian protests.

The party does not have any political representation in the National Assembly and currently acts as an extra-parliamentary force.

== Ideology ==
The parties manifesto calls for the development of strong and progressive statehoods of both Armenia and Artsakh, while opposing authoritarianism. The party encourages economic reform and immigration to Armenia, increasing environmental protection, and improving human rights for all citizens. The party advocates for allowing the Armenian Diaspora to be allowed to vote in elections and giving the Armenian Diaspora political representation within the National Assembly. The party also supports the recognition of Artsakh as an independent state.

In terms of foreign policy, the party supports Armenia's European integration and believes that Armenia belongs to the Pan-European family of states.

== Electoral record ==
The party participated in the 2017 Yerevan City Council election. The party received 7.75% of the vote, gaining 5 seats in the Yerevan City Council.

The party also participated in the 2018 Yerevan City Council election, but lost all 5 seats in the Yerevan City Council following the election, gaining just 1.39% of the vote.

The party has not participated in any national elections. Prior to the 2018 Armenian parliamentary election, the party declined to participate and boycotted the election, due to concerns over electoral fraud and corruption. The party did not participate in the 2021 Armenian parliamentary elections.

Prior to the 2023 Yerevan City Council election, the party announced it would join the Mother Armenia Alliance. Following the election, the alliance won 12 seats in the Yerevan City Council.

== See also ==
- Politics of Armenia
- Programs of political parties in Armenia
