= Towards Russia Party =

Towards Russia Party Ուժեղ Հայաստան Ռուսաստանի հետ
- Leader: Hayk Babukhanyan
- Founded: 2021
- Headquarters: Yerevan
- Ideology: Russophilia; Armenian nationalism

The Towards Russia Party (Armenian: Ուժեղ Հայաստան Ռուսաստանի հետ, romanized: Uzhegh Hayastan Rrusastani het), also known as Strong Armenia with Russia Party, is an Armenian political party.

== History ==
The party held its founding congress on 6 February 2021 and it is led by Hayk Babukhanyan. The party does not have any political representation within the National Assembly and currently acts as an extra-parliamentary force.

Following the 2020–2021 Armenian protests, the party confirmed that it would participate in the 2021 Armenian parliamentary elections, but ultimately the party failed to register.

Hayk Babukhanyan held a meeting with Mher Mesropyan, leader of the Voice of the Nation Party. The leaders discussed possible cooperation between the two parties. Representatives from the Constitutional Rights Union and the National Unity Party were also present and endorsed the creation of a political alliance. All four parties called for greater integration between Armenia and Russia, while also supporting closer ties between Artsakh and Russia.

On 13 April 2021, the Towards Russia Party, the Voice of the Nation Party, and the Constitutional Rights Union officially announced the formation of a political alliance named "New Union". Meanwhile, the Alliance Party initially supported the "New Union" alliance, but opted not to join.

== Ideology ==
The party is staunchly pro-Russian, and calls for Armenia to create a deeper partnership with Russia and to join the Union State of Belarus and Russia. In February 2021, the party held a rally in Yerevan where Hayk Babukhanyan stated, "Long live a strong Armenia with Russia, long live the military-political brotherhood of the Russian-Armenian peoples." The party also calls for increasing the defense and security budget.

The party has opposed Prime Minister Nikol Pashinyan's Pro-Western policies and has claimed Pashinyan is being ruled by George Soros.

== See also ==
- Programs of political parties in Armenia
