= Armenia is Our Home =

Armenian political alliance

Armenia is Our Home Party Մեր տունը Հայաստանն է կուսակցություն
- Leader: Ara Abramyan
- Founded: 2018
- Headquarters: Yerevan
- Ideology: Russophilia
- Political position: Centre
- Member parties: Alliance Party; Union of Armenians of Russia
- National Assembly: 0 / 107

Armenia is Our Home, also known as the Our Home is Armenia Party (Armenian: Մեր տունը Հայաստանն է կուսակցություն, romanized: Mer tuny Hayastann e kusakts’ut’yun), is an Armenian political alliance between the Alliance Party and the Union of Armenians of Russia organization.

== History ==
The Armenia is Our Home Party was first founded in 2004 and led by Vachakan Chibukhchyan. It was then de-registered in 2016 but re-registered in 2018, following the Velvet Revolution. However, Chibukhchyan is no longer associated with the party. Its current leader is Ara Abramyan, the president of the Union of Armenians in Russia. The party announced that they would participate in the 2021 Armenian parliamentary elections as a political alliance with the Alliance Party. The leader of the Alliance Party, Tigran Urikhanyan, was nominated by the alliance to be the candidate for prime minister.

Following the election, the alliance did not enter the National Assembly, gaining just 0.95% of the popular vote.

== Ideology ==
The alliance maintains a Pro-Russian stance and calls for greater cooperation between Armenia and Russia. The alliance supports independence for Artsakh, strengthening the economy, and protecting the territorial integrity of Armenia.

== Electoral record ==
Election	Votes	%	Seats	+/–	Position	Government
2021	12,149	0.95	0 / 107	0	▲13th	Extra-parliamentary

== See also ==
- Programs of political parties in Armenia
