= Mother Armenia Alliance =

Political party in Armenia

Mother Armenia Alliance Մայր Հայաստան դաշինք
- Leader: Andranik Tevanyan
- Founded: 9 August 2023
- Headquarters: Yerevan, Armenia
- Ideology: Armenian nationalism Russophilia
- Alliance of: Apricot Country Party; Intellectual Armenia Party
- Endorsed by: Armenia Alliance
- Yerevan City Council: 12 / 65

The Mother Armenia Alliance (Armenian: Մայր Հայաստան դաշինք, romanized: Mayr Hayastan dashink’) is an Armenian political party.

== History ==
The Mother Armenia Alliance was established on 9 August 2023 during a founding congress held in Yerevan. Chairman of the party, Andranik Tevanyan, was a former non-partisan deputy in the National Assembly under the Armenia Alliance. Tevanyan left the Armenia Alliance and stepped down from his post in the National Assembly in order to run in the 2023 Yerevan City Council elections. The Apricot Country Party and the Intellectual Armenia Party subsequently joined the Mother Armenia Alliance, as did one member from the National Democratic Union.

As response to the formation of the Mother Armenia alliance, the Armenia Alliance refrained from fielding candidates and together with former president Robert Kocharyan and the Armenian Revolutionary Federation, endorsed the Mother Armenia Alliance.

The party participated in the 2023 Yerevan City Council election, nominating Andranik Tevanyan as their candidate for Mayor of Yerevan. Following the election, the party won 12 seats in the Yerevan City Council, gaining 15.43% of the vote.

On 19 September 2023, Andranik Tevanyan called for the impeachment of Prime Minister Nikol Pashinyan. Tevanyan was detained by police on 21 September 2023, during protests in Yerevan.

== Ideology ==
The party's stated aim is to "overcome the security challenges facing Armenia and Artsakh". The alliance has called to deepen Armenia's political and military relations with Russia and Iran, while also maintaining cordial relations with the West. The party supports the expansion of the middle class, increasing the minimum wage, and further developing the economy of Armenia.

== See also ==
- Programs of political parties in Armenia
