= United Armenia Party (Armenia) =

United Armenia Միացյալ Հայաստան
- Leader: Yervand Tarverdyan
- Founded: 10 April 2021
- Headquarters: Yerevan
- Ideology: Youth politics
- Slogan: "Stable economy, strong state"

United Armenia (Armenian: Միացյալ Հայաստան) is an Armenian political party. It was founded on 10 April 2021 and is currently led by Yervand Tarverdyan.

== History ==
The party was established during the 2020–2021 Armenian protests and does not have any political representation in the National Assembly. The party currently acts as an extra-parliamentary force. The party had confirmed that they would participate in the 2021 Armenian parliamentary elections independently and not form any political alliances, but the party ultimately failed to register.

The party participated in the 2023 Yerevan City Council elections, nominating Yervand Tarverdyan as candidate for Mayor of Yerevan. Following the elections, the party failed to win any seats in the Yerevan City Council, winning just 0.55% of the vote.

== Ideology ==
The party supports increasing opportunities for youth in the country. Yervand Tarverdyan has stated, "Youth are very important for all of us, because as I say, this election will be won by the youth and the person who gives the youth love and faith will be the next leader of our country". On 7 May 2021, the party held a meeting with youth from Yerevan to discuss issues facing young people in Armenia. Tarverdyan called for improving education, increasing funding for art and cultural initiatives, creating jobs, and ensuring equality for all.

Tarverdyan also calls for global unity of the Armenian diaspora and believes that Armenia should be able to defend itself against external threats, namely Turkey and Azerbaijan. In regards to foreign policy, the party believes Armenia should have good relations with Russia and the West. The party considers Russia as Armenia's strategic partner, while also seeking to develop Armenia's relations with European countries, the United States, and maintaining positive relations with India, China, Iran, among others.

== See also ==
- Programs of political parties in Armenia
