= Intellectual Armenia Party =

Intellectual Armenia Party Մտավոր Հայաստան
- Leader: Manuk Sukiasyan
- Founded: 2021
- Headquarters: Yerevan, Armenia
- Ideology: Technocracy
- Slogan: "Science has no alternative"
- National Assembly: 0 / 107

The Intellectual Armenia Party (Armenian: Մտավոր Հայաստան) is an Armenian political party. It was founded on 30 April 2021 and is led by Chairman Manuk Sukiasyan.

== History ==
The party was founded during the 2020–2021 Armenian protests. Manuk Sukiasyan was a former member of the Mission Party and an ally of Prime Minister Nikol Pashinyan, however Sukiasyan left the Mission Party and called on Pashinyan to resign. The party does not maintain any political representation in the National Assembly and currently acts as an extra-parliamentary force.

The party endorsed the Armenia Alliance in the 2021 Armenian parliamentary election.

Prior to the 2023 Yerevan City Council election, the party announced it would join the Mother Armenia Alliance. Following the election, the alliance won 12 seats in the Yerevan City Council.

== Ideology ==
The party greatly values education and the party believes that they can improve the status of the country through knowledge. The party calls for creating a prosperous future through science, education, and aims to protect the interests of small and medium-sized businesses. The party also calls for the protection of human rights, developing a strong economy, and improving the efficiency of the army.

== See also ==
- Programs of political parties in Armenia
