= Karen Sargsyan (sociologist) =

Armenian sociologist and politician (born 1977)

Karen Vachagani Sargsyan (Armenian: Կարեն Վաչագանի Սարգսյան) (born 29 May 1977, Yerevan) is an Armenian sociologist and had previously served as the president of the Armenian Euro-Atlantic Integration Centre.

== Career and education ==
Since 2017, Sargsyan has served as the head of the IT division for the Statistical Committee of Armenia. Between 2014 and 2017, Sargsyan worked for the consulate of Malta to Armenia in Yerevan. He obtained a diploma in sociology from Yerevan State University. In 2005, Sargsyan defended his PhD in Economics thesis, "Migration flows management (information technology industry)".

Sargsyan often presents political commentary and analysis regarding current events in Armenia, the Caucasus region, and Eastern Europe. Sargsyan is critical of Russia's influence over Armenia and opposes Armenia's membership in Russian led organizations, including the CSTO. Sargsyan supports the European integration of Armenia and supports the country's political and security alignment with the European Union. On 21 February 2023, Sargsyan signed a declaration by Armenian civil society calling for the government to submit an EU membership bid without delay.

Sargsyan is a vocal critic of the Nikol Pashinyan Cabinet, namely Minister of Economy Vaan Kerobyan and Deputy Prime Minister Mher Grigoryan.

=== 2018 Armenian parliamentary election ===
Sargsyan participated in the 2018 Armenian parliamentary elections as a member of the We Alliance. The We Alliance received just 2% of the popular vote, failing to gain any representation in the National Assembly.

=== 2023 Yerevan mayoral candidate ===
On 21 June 2023, Sargsyan was nominated by the Dignified Yerevan political alliance as their candidate for Mayor of Yerevan in Yerevan City Council elections in September 2023. The European Party of Armenia and the Social Democrat Hunchakian Party jointly nominated Sargsyan as their candidate. The alliance, however, dissolved in August 2023, prior to the municipal elections and Sargsyan withdrew his candidacy.

== Personal life ==
In addition to Armenian, he speaks English and Russian.

== See also ==
- Politics of Armenia
