= Land mines in Chechnya =

Land mines in Chechnya refers to the mines planted by both Russian and Chechen fighters during the First and Second Chechen Wars. In 2004, Chechnya was the most land mine-affected region in the world.

According to UNICEF, there are over 500,000 explosive devices scattered across Chechnya. From the First Chechen War to 2002, around 10,000 people have been killed or injured, including 4,000 women and children, due to explosive devices.

== History ==
Russian forces deployed anti-personnel mines from airplanes, helicopters, and rockets, resulting in large tracts of mined land that are unmarked and unfenced. In addition, only half of the cluster munitions dropped in Chechnya detonated.

Urban areas (including civil buildings in the capital Grozny), villages, roads, fields, woods, mountain paths, bridges, and rivers were mined. Eighty percent of minefields were unmarked. The most heavily mined areas are those in which rebels continue to put up resistance, namely the southern regions, and the borders of Chechnya.

No humanitarian mine clearance has taken place since the HALO Trust was evicted in December 1999, after the Russian government accused the organization of espionage and arrested some of its staff. In June 2002, Olara Otunnu, the United Nations Special Representative for Children and Armed Conflict, estimated that there were 500,000 land mines placed in the region.

In 2003, a watchdog group claimed that more people were killed by land mines in 2002 than anywhere else in the world. The International Campaign to Ban Landmines reported that 2,140 people were killed in 2001 which, in 2002, more than doubled to 5,695 people.

On April 4, 2006, UNICEF and European Commission said in a joint statement released in Moscow that over 3,030 people have been maimed or killed by land mines in the course of the Second Chechen War (April 4 marked the first International Day for Mine Awareness). UNICEF has recorded 2,340 civilian land mines and unexploded ordnance casualties occurring in Chechnya between 1999 and the end of 2003.

In 2012, the Russian military began demining operations in Chechnya. From 2012 to 2017, more than 13,000 hectares of land had been cleared by military engineers. An estimated 10,000 explosive objects were destroyed.

== See also ==
- First Chechen War
- Second Chechen War
- Land mine situation in Nagorno-Karabakh
