= Andranik Tevanyan =

Armenian politician

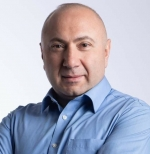

Member of National Assembly
- In office 1 August 2021 – 17 August 2023

Personal details
- Born: Andranik Noriki Tevanyan; 5 May 1974 (age 52) Yerevan, Armenian SSR, Soviet Union
- Party: Independent
- Other political affiliations: Mother Armenia Alliance (2023-present); Armenia Alliance (until 2023)
- Education: National University of Architecture and Construction of Armenia; National Polytechnic University of Armenia

Andranik Noriki Tevanyan (Armenian: Անդրանիկ Նորիկի Թևանյան; born 5 May 1974) is an Armenian politician who served as a member of the National Assembly from 2021 and 2023. He is the leader of the Mother Armenia Alliance in which he founded.

== Early life and education ==
Tevanyan was born on 5 May 1974 in Yerevan. In 1997, he graduated from National University of Architecture and Construction of Armenia, Faculty of Construction Economics and Management. In 1999, he graduated from the "Engineering Management" department of the National Polytechnic University of Armenia with a degree in engineering.

== Career ==
From 1999 to 2000, Tevanyan was an advisor to the Minister of Economy, and from 2000 to 2001, he was the chief editor of the news program of "Ar" TV Company, the executive director of the TV company. In 2001, he was the host of the economic-analytical program of Public Television. From 2002 to 2006, he taught at the National Polytechnic University of Armenia, and from 2003 to 2013 at the Russian-Armenian University. In 2009, the "7 Or" news analytical website was founded at the "Polytekonomy" research institute in which Tevanyan founded.

== Politics ==
In June 2021, Tevanyan was elected to the National Assembly as part of the Armenia Alliance.

On 9 August 2023, Tevanyan founded the Mother Armenia Alliance in Yerevan. He left the Armenia Alliance and resigned from his post in the National Assembly in order to run in the 2023 Yerevan City Council election. In that election, his party won 12 seats in the Yerevan City Council, gaining 15.43% of the vote.

On 19 September 2023, Tevanyan called for the impeachment of Prime Minister Nikol Pashinyan and he was arrested by police two days later, during protests in Yerevan.
