= World Armenian Congress =

Organization

World Armenian Congress logo

The World Armenian Congress (WAC) (Armenian: Համաշխարհային հայկական կոնգրես, romanized: Hamashkharhayin haykakan kongres), also known as the Congress of World Armenian Organizations, is an international union of Armenian public organizations.

== History ==
The World Armenian Congress was founded in October 2003 as a union for Armenian NGO's, and has since reached an international status. The WAC headquarters are located in Yerevan. A youth branch of the organization, known as the "WAC Association of Youth Organizations", was founded in 2006.

The organization regularly organizes summits for its international members. The first congress was held in October 2008. The focus of the summit was on strengthening the connections between Armenia and Armenians in Russia.

On 15 October 2012, 147 delegates were present at the second congress of the World Armenian Congress hosted in Yerevan. Former president of Armenia, Serzh Sargsyan addressed the delegates. The president stated, "Thanks to the various non-governmental organizations existing in the four corners of the world, we can talk about the world Armenian civil society, whether they are political, charitable, cultural or professional organizations, and the success of which we should all be proud of." Meanwhile, president of the WAC, Ara Abramyan stated, "Our priority program direction has been and will be the preservation and development of the Armenian national identity, jointly with Diaspora organizations and community structures, elaboration and implementation of targeted programs aimed at uniting Armenians."

During the 2020–2021 Armenian protests, Ara Abramyan and the WAC called for Prime Minister Nikol Pashinyan to resign.

== Objectives ==
The main objectives of the WAC is to strengthen relations between Armenia and the Armenian Diaspora, contribute to Armenia's economic development, achieve a peaceful settlement of the Nagorno-Karabakh conflict and support independence for Artsakh, as well as, advocate for the international recognition of the Armenian genocide.

== Leadership ==
The current president is Armenian-Russian businessman, Ara Abramyan. Abramyan also leads the Union of Armenians of Russia organization.

== See also ==
- Armenians
