= Victory Party (Armenia) =

Victory Party Հաղթանակի կուսակցություն
- Leader: Viktor Mnatsakanyan
- Founded: 2023
- Headquarters: Yerevan, Armenia
- National Assembly: 0 / 107

The Victory Party (Armenian: Հաղթանակի կուսակցություն, romanized: Haght’anaki kusakts’ut’yun) is an Armenian political party.

== History ==
The Victory Party was established in April 2023 and Viktor Mnatsakanyan was elected as party Chairman.

The party participated in the 2023 Yerevan City Council election and had nominated Viktor Mnatsakanyan as their candidate for Mayor of Yerevan. Following the election, the party won just 1.71% of the vote, failing to gain any seats in the Yerevan City Council. Prior to the election, the party confirmed that it is neither pro-government or opposition, but rather, more focused on urban issues.

The party has no political representation within the National Assembly and currently acts as an extra-parliamentary force.

== Ideology ==
The party advocates for free public transport in Yerevan, the expansion and development of parks and green spaces in the city, and building more homes for citizens.

== See also ==
- Programs of political parties in Armenia
