= Sovereign Union of Nations =

Proposed anthem for the Union State

Derzhavny Soyuz Narodov
English: Sovereign Union of Nations
- Державный Союз Народов
- Proposed anthem of Union State
- Lyrics: Vladimir Kalinkin, 2000
- Music: Alexander Alexandrov

Audio sample
- file; help

The Sovereign Union of Nations (Russian: Державный Союз Народов, Derzhavny Soyuz Narodov; Belarusian: Дзяржаўны Саюз Народаў, Dzyarzhauny Sayuz Narodau) has been proposed as an anthem for the Union State. The song, which was modified from the State Anthem of the Soviet Union, refers to a wider union of the two nations (Belarus and Russia).

In 2022, Union State General Secretary Dmitry Mezentsev announced that proposals will be prepared on the anthem for consideration by the Supreme State Council.

== Lyrics ==
Russian

I
Да будет во благо сплочение наше!
Пусть крепнет тепло наших дружеских уз.
Да будет вовеки светлее и краше
Свободных народов Державный Союз!

Припев:
Славься народами мудрость хранимая —
Та, что к согласию, к миру зовёт!
Здравствуй, великое, несокрушимое
Наше содружество, весь наш народ!

II
У нас за плечами глубины столетий —
История нашей единой страны.
И в мирные дни, и в разгар лихолетий
Клянёмся всегда быть Союзу верны!

Припев

Russian Latin alphabet

I
Da budet vo blago spločenie naše!
Pustʹ krepnet teplo naših družeskih uz.
Da budet voveki svetlee i kraše
Svobodnyh narodov Deržavnyj Sojuz!

Pripev:
Slavʹsja narodami mudrostʹ hranimaja —
Ta, čto k soglasiju, k miru zovët!
Zdravstvuj, velikoe, nesokrušimoe
Naše sodružestvo, vesʹ naš narod!

II
U nas za plečami glubiny stoletij —
Istorija našej edinoj strany.
I v mirnye dni, i v razgar liholetij
Kljanëmsja vsegda bytʹ Sojuzu verny!

Pripev

Belarusian

I
Хай будзе на карысць згуртаванне наша!
Хай мацнее цяпло нашых сяброўскіх повязяў.
Хай будзе вавекі святлей і прыгажэй
Свабодных народаў Дзяржаўны Саюз!

Прыпеў:
Слаўся народамі мудрасць захоўваемая —
Тая, што да згоды, да міру кліча!
Добры дзень, вялікае, нязломнае
Наша Садружнасць, увесь наш народ!

II
У нас за плячыма глыбіні стагоддзяў —
Гісторыя нашай адзінай краіны.
І ў мірныя дні, і ў разгар ліхалеццяў
Клянемся заўсёды быць Саюзу верныя!

Прыпеў

English

I
May our unity be for good!
Let the warmth of our friendly bonds grow stronger.
Let it be ever brighter and more beautiful
The free people's sovereign union!

Chorus:
Be glorified by the peoples of the wisdom of the stored -
The one that calls to the world!
Hello, great, invincible
Our community, all our people!

II
We have the depths of centuries behind us -
The history of our united country.
And in peace days, and in the midst of hard times
We swear that the Union is always right!

Chorus
