= Dignified Yerevan =

Dignified Yerevan Արժանապատիվ Երևան
- Founded: 21 June 2023
- Dissolved: 12 August 2023
- Headquarters: Yerevan
- Ideology: Armenian nationalism Green liberalism Pro-Europeanism; Pro-Western
- Political position: Centre
- Alliance of: European Party of Armenia; Social Democrat Hunchakian Party

Dignified Yerevan (Armenian: Արժանապատիվ Երևան, romanized: Arzhanapativ Yerevan) was an electoral alliance of two political parties in Armenia. It was founded in 2023 and was headquartered in Yerevan. The alliance dissolved in August 2023.

== History ==
Dignified Yerevan was an electoral alliance established on 21 June 2023 during a founding ceremony held in Yerevan. The alliance consisted of the European Party of Armenia (EPA) and the Social Democrat Hunchakian Party. The two parties signed a memorandum of cooperation in order to participate in Yerevan City Council elections in September 2023 on a joint list. The alliance announced Karen Sargsyan as its candidate for the position of Mayor of Yerevan.

The Social Democrat Hunchakian Party failed to update their registration in accordance with Armenia's electoral law. The alliance ultimately dissolved prior to the Yerevan municipal elections. The European Party of Armenia later confirmed that they would participate in the elections independently.

== Leadership ==
- Tigran Khzmalyan - Chairman of the European Party of Armenia
- Sedrak Achemyan - Chairman of the Social Democrat Hunchakian Party
- Karen Sargsyan - mayoral candidate

== Ideology ==
Mayoral candidate Karen Sargsyan stated, "We must build a city where there will be justice, dignity, a city that will be a safe and prosperous capital of Armenia. We will make Yerevan the capital of all Armenians again, we will make Yerevan a place where it will be an honor to spend the summer, we will make Yerevan a truly cultural capital. We are coming to return to Yerevan the title of the dignified capital of all Armenians."

The European Party of Armenia supports Armenia's European integration and calls for the country to submit a European Union accession bid.

== See also ==
- Programs of political parties in Armenia
