= Constitutional Rights Union =

Constitutional Rights Union Սահմանադրական իրավունքների միություն
- Leader: Hayk Babukhanyan
- Founded: 1989
- Headquarters: Yerevan
- Ideology: Conservatism; Russophilia; Pro-EAEU; Euroscepticism
- Political position: Right-wing
- National Assembly: 0 / 107

The Constitutional Rights Union (CRU) (Armenian: Սահմանադրական իրավունքների միություն, romanized: Sahmanadrakan iravunk’neri miut’yun) is a conservative political party in Armenia.

== History ==
The party first participated in the 1999 Armenian parliamentary election in a newly created political alliance named the "Law and Unity Bloc". The alliance gained 7 seats in the National Assembly.

The party has not participated in any recent parliamentary elections and currently has no representation in the National Assembly.

In 2020, the party endorsed the Homeland Salvation Movement.

In 2021, the party joined the "New Union" political alliance along with the Voice of the Nation Party and the Towards Russia Party.

In April 2021, the party signed a memorandum of cooperation with the Justice party in Artsakh.

== Ideology ==
The party opposes both communism and liberalism. The goal of the party is for Armenia to become a center for collaboration among Russia, Georgia, Iran and Arab countries. Babukhanyan stated that he fully supports Armenia's membership in the Eurasian Union and mentioned that "The Eurasian Union has outdone the European Union by economic indicators." The party supports Armenia joining the Union State. Babukhanyan is known for his Pro-Russian stance and has even called for the British Council to be banned in Armenia.

During the 2018 Armenian revolution, Babukhanyan claimed that Foundations run by George Soros had contributed to the recent unrest in Armenia.

== Party leadership ==
Partial list:

- Hayk Babukhanyan, chairman
- Artak Grigoryan, deputy chairman
- Rafael Avetisyan, head of youth division

== See also ==
- Politics of Armenia
- Programs of political parties in Armenia
