= Zaruhi Postanjyan =

Armenian politician

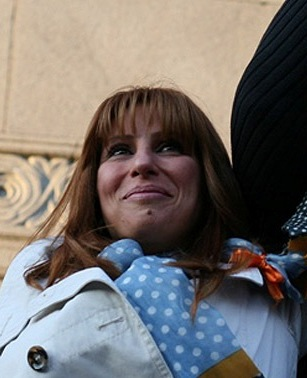

Head of "Yerkir Dzirani" party

Personal details
- Born: 1972 (age 53–54) Yerevan, Armenian SSR, Soviet Union
- Party: Yerkir Dzirani
- Occupation: public activist

Zaruhi Postanjyan (Armenian: Զարուհի Փոստանջյան; born January 16, 1972, Yerevan) is an Armenian Member of Parliament since 2007, a public activist and a member of Heritage board. She was the head of "Heritage" faction of National Assembly of Armenia.

== Early life ==
Zaruhi Postanjyan was born on January 16, 1972, in Yerevan, Armenia. She graduated from the Yerevan MYUD Law Institute in 1994.

== Career ==
Postanjyan worked as a lawyer of Helsinki Association NGO, Armenia in 1998-1998. She received a patent on advocacy in 1999. She was a lawyer in Women’s Rights Center NGO in 1999-2000. She was the lawyer at the Wrestling Olympic Youth Sport School of Armenia. From 2000 to 2007 she was the Chairperson of the Advocates for Human Rights NGO, and the author and presenter of the TV programme Advocate. Since 1999, she has been a member of Advocates’ Chamber of Armenia. On May 12, 2007, she was elected a member of the National Assembly of Armenia. In 2012 she was re-elected to the Armenian parliament.

Postanjyan was awarded a diploma, an order and a memorial medal by the Armenian All-National Union Zoravar Andranik.

=== Disagreements with President Sargsyan ===
In October 2013, when the President of Armenia Serzh Sargsyan addressed the Council of Europe's Parliamentary Assembly in Strasbourg, Postanjyan took the floor to ask him if he had visited a casino in Europe, if it was true that he had lost 70 million euros in the process and where he had obtained the money. Sargsyan strenuously denied ever having visited a casino and Postanjyan was subsequently removed from the Armenian delegation to the Parliamentary Assembly. Defending Zaruhi Postanjyan’s right to freedom of speech, Heritage party condemned political persecution of its member. According to the pro-opposition website Armenianow.com, Postanjyan got hero’s welcome from supporters at Zvartnots Airport after challenging President in Strasbourg. People held flowers, balloons and flags of Armenia as they came to greet Postanjyan.

=== Police altercation ===
In Yerevan on May 14, 2017, on the day of the municipal election she was running for, Postanjyan and her daughter were dragged out of the campaign offices of the Republic Party by the police. They had come into the office to complain about vote buying.

== Personal life ==
Postanjyan is married and has three children.
