= Voice of the Nation (Armenia) =

Voice of the Nation Ազգի ձայն
- Leader: Mher Mesropyan
- Founded: 21 April 2021
- Headquarters: Yerevan
- Ideology: Russophilia; Armenian nationalism

Website
- azgidzayn.com

Voice of the Nation (Armenian: Ազգի ձայն, romanized: Azgi dzayn) is an Armenian political party.

== History ==
The party held its founding congress on 21 April 2021 and it is led by singer Mher Mesropyan. The party does not have any political representation within the National Assembly and currently acts as an extra-parliamentary force.

Mher Mesropyan held a meeting with Hayk Babukhanyan, leader of the Towards Russia Party. The leaders discussed possible cooperation between the two parties. Representatives from the Constitutional Rights Union and the National Unity Party were also present. All four parties called for greater integration between Armenia and Russia, while also supporting closer ties between Artsakh and Russia. On 13 April 2021, the Voice of the Nation Party, the Towards Russia Party, and the Constitutional Rights Union officially announced a political alliance between them, named "New Union".

Following the 2020–2021 Armenian protests, the party confirmed that it would participate in the 2021 Armenian parliamentary elections, but ultimately the party failed to register.

== Ideology ==
The party is staunchly pro-Russian, and calls for Armenia to create a union-state partnership with Russia. The party also calls for increasing the amount of Russian schools and Russian language classes in Armenia.

The party has been critical of the former ruling My Step Alliance, calling them globalists ruled by George Soros. Mher Mesropyan has also been unsupportive of democratic protests including the 2018 Armenian revolution and the 2020–2021 Belarusian protests, and has implied his support to Alexander Lukashenko.

== See also ==
- Programs of political parties in Armenia
