= EVN Report =

- Type: Online news site
- Format: web
- Editor: Maria Titizian
- Founded: March 6, 2017
- Headquarters: 31 Moskovyan Street, Yerevan, Armenia
- Website: www.evnreport.com

EVN Report is an independent, non-profit, and investigative online news site covering Armenian news for an English-speaking audience. It is based in Yerevan, from which it gets its namesake (EVN is the IATA airport code for the international airport located within the city).

== History ==
The site began publishing in 2017 but launched to prominence during the 2018 Velvet Revolution in Armenia, as a major source of English-language reporting. After its start at the Yerevan Impact Hub incubator center, it moved into its own office space in 2019.

In addition to covering current news, EVN Report also places emphasis on policy areas that it considers neglected by other outlets. As an independent, non-profit organization, it is funded through donations made by readers. EVN Report has also received a grant from the National Endowment for Democracy.

EVN Report's journalism has received international recognition, including the Grand Prix of the 2021 and 2024 Suitcase Journalism Awards, organized with the participation of the United Nations High Commissioner for Refugees, the International Organization for Migration, and People in Need.

In 2023, Reporters Without Borders described EVN Report as a "leading media outlet" at the forefront of defending press freedom and independent journalism in Armenia. The media research organization SembraMedia included EVN Report in its Project Oasis directory of independent media, recognizing its original public-interest journalism, editorial independence, and transparency.
