= Ara Abramyan =

Soviet businessman

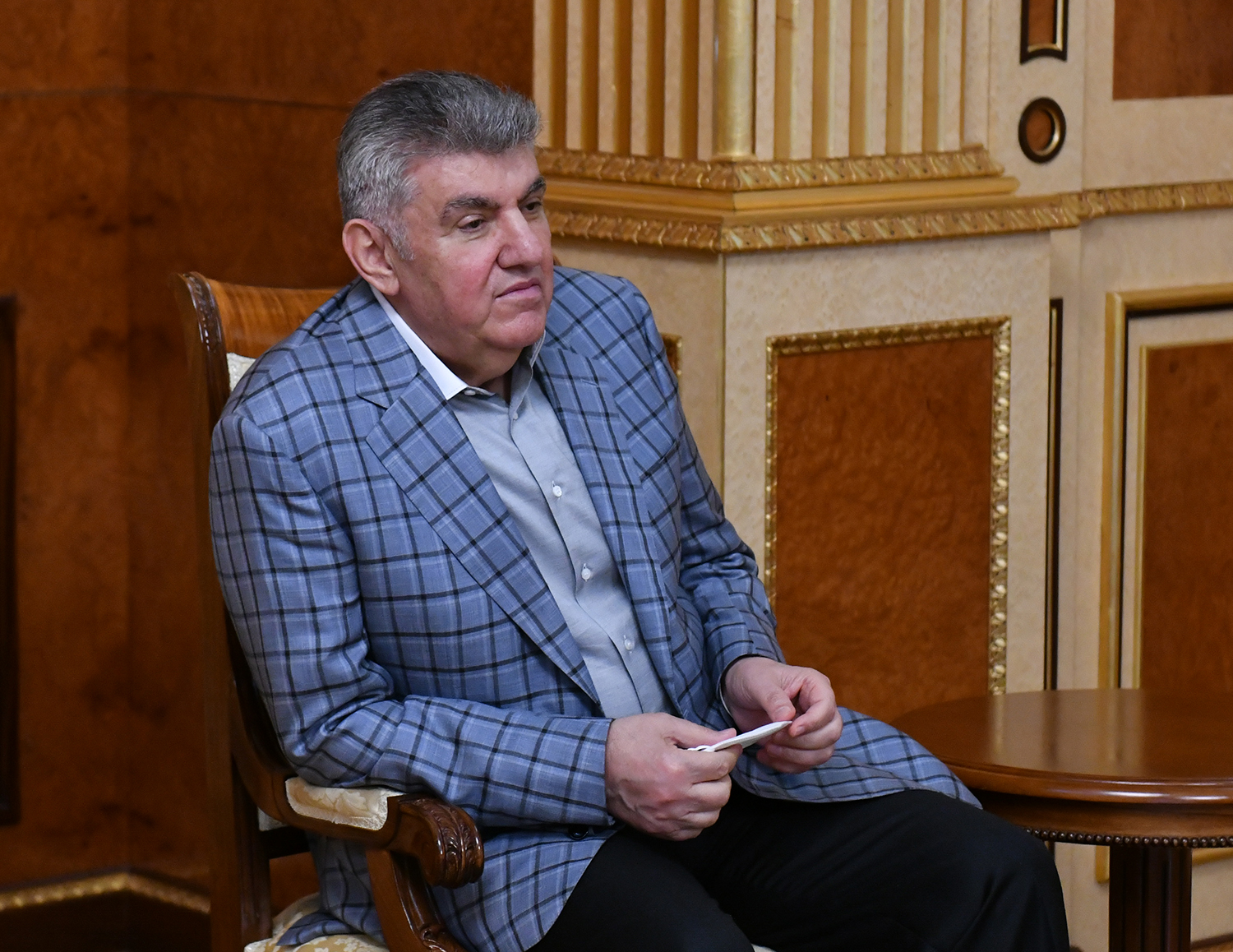
- Born: 15 April 1957 (age 69); Malishka, Armenian SSR, Soviet Union
- Occupations: philanthropist, businessman

The speaking voice of Ara Abramyan, from the Echo of Moscow program.

Ara Abrahamyan (Russian: Ара Аршавирович Абрамян; born 15 April 1957 in Malishka, Yeghegnadzor District, Armenia) (Armenian: Արա Աբրահամյան) is a prominent philanthropist, social activist, and businessman. He was born in Malishka, a village in Vayots Dzor Region, Armenia, in a family of physicians. He attended Yerevan State Agricultural University and gained a degree in economics.

== Career ==
He started his career path as an engineer in “Neuron” Industrial enterprise growing to the General Manager of the company. In 1989, he was appointed the Deputy Head of the Department at the USSR Ministry of Electronic Industry. Benevolence dining hall “Arshavir and Baidzar Abrahamyan” opened in Yerevan in 2001.

Abrahamyan has held the position of the President of the Union of Armenians in Russia since 2000 and the President of the World Armenian Congress since 2003. He is also a co-Chairman of Production Councils with South Korea, Brazil, Argentina, France, Nigeria, Libya and the Russian Federation. He is also the current leader of the Armenia is Our Home party.

He participated in the releasing of 6 Armenian pilots from Equatorial Guinea in 2005, detained by local authorities, and in the rescue of 12 Russian sailors, detained in Nigeria in 2006.

== Achievements/Orders ==
- 1991 - “Honored Employee” medal by USSR Ministry of Electronic Industry
- 1996 - Russian Federation Presidential Certificate of Honor
- 1998 - Night cross of Saint Constantine the Great
- 1999 – Honored builder of Russia
- 1999 – UNESCO Certificate of Honor for high social activity (for participation in rebuilding the Kremlin Fortress)
- 2000 - “Saint Enlightener Order”, the highest award of the Armenian Apostolic Church, for merits to the Armenian people.
- 2001 – “For genuine dedication” medal by “Orthodox Russia” Social Movement.
- 2001 - “For strengthening Military Cooperation” medal by the Ministry of Defense of Russian Federation.
- 2001, 2003, 2005, 2011- “Man of the Year” national prize of Russian Federation for strengthening the civil society.
- 2002 – Order of Friendship of Russian Federation
- 2003 – Gold medal by the National Academy of Sciences of Armenia.
- 2003 – UNESCO’s “Good Will Ambassador”
- 2005 - National order of the legion of Honor of France. For developing Russian-French relations and promoting greater cooperation.
