= HALO Trust =

Non-government organisation founded 1988

The HALO Trust
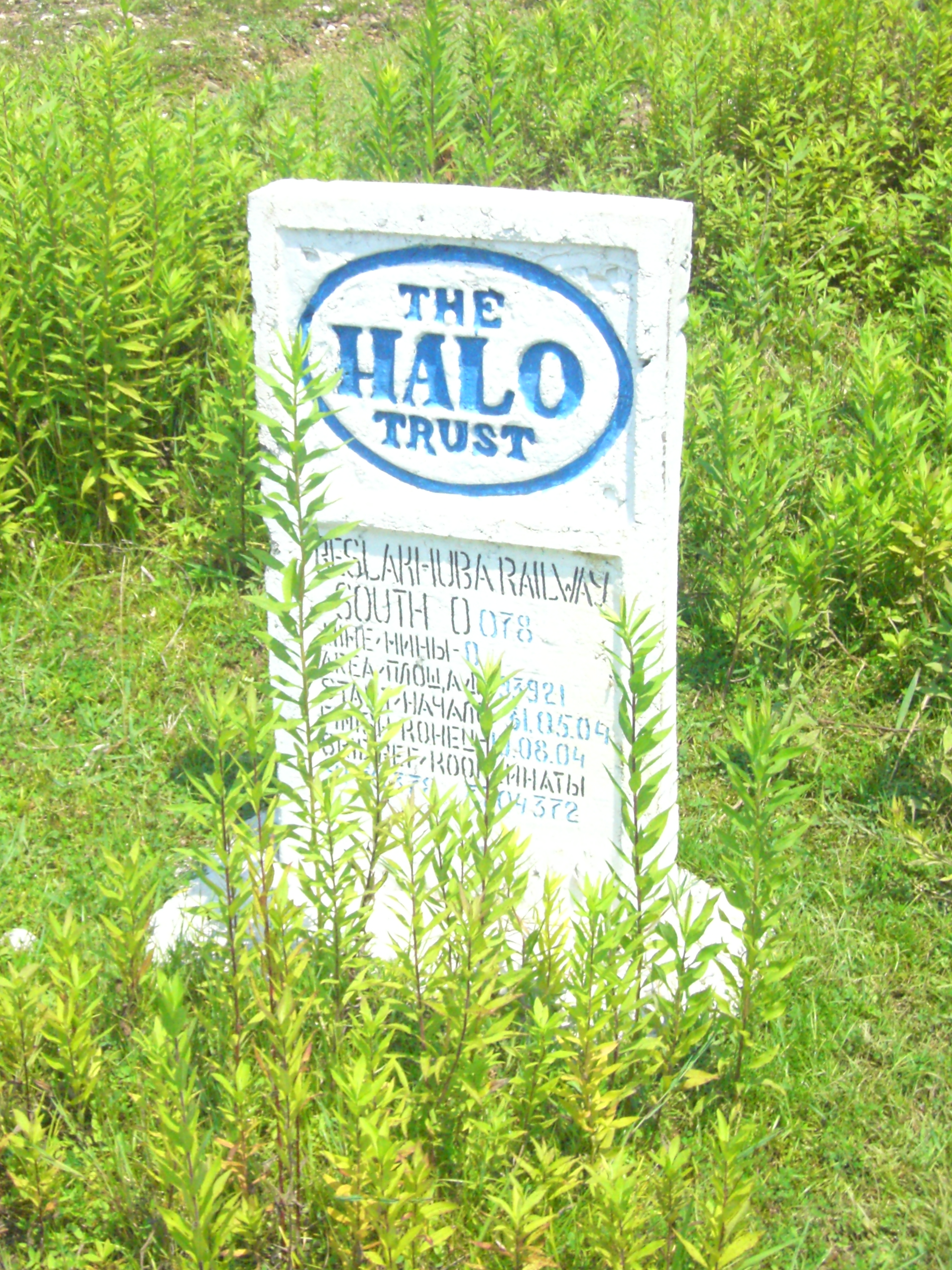
- The stone installed by HALO Trust after checking the territory for mines, Ochamchira District, Abkhazia
- Founded: 1988; 38 years ago
- Founder: Guy Willoughby, Colin Campbell Mitchell and Sue Mitchell
- Type: Non-governmental organization, Non-profit organization
- Purpose: Humanitarianism
- Headquarters: Thornhill, Dumfries and Galloway, Scotland, United Kingdom, Washington, D.C., United States
- Region served: Worldwide
- Method: Demining
- Employees: 10,000
- Website: www.halotrust.org

The HALO Trust (Hazardous Area Life-support Organisation) is a humanitarian non-government organisation which primarily works to clear landmines and other explosive devices left behind by conflicts. With over 10,000 staff worldwide, HALO has operations in 28 countries. Its largest operation is in Afghanistan, where the organisation continues to operate under the Taliban regime that took power in August 2021.

HALO's global headquarters are located in Thornhill, Dumfries and Galloway, United Kingdom. HALO has offices in Salisbury, UK, London, UK, Washington, D.C., US and The Hague, Netherlands.

== History ==
The organisation was founded in 1988 by Guy Willoughby, former junior officer in the Coldstream Guards and Colin Campbell Mitchell, a British member of Parliament, former colonel in the British Army, and his wife Sue Mitchell. Willoughby won the Robert Burns Humanitarian Award in 2009. HALO's first programme began operations in Afghanistan, clearing landmines left by the departing Soviet military. The next major programme to open, in 1991, was in Cambodia. HALO attracted global coverage in January 1997 when Diana Princess of Wales visited a minefield being cleared by HALO employees in Huambo, Angola.

== Leadership ==
In February 2015, James Cowan was appointed HALO's chief executive officer. Cowan was a British Army major-general who commanded the 3rd (United Kingdom) Division during a 33-year army career.

Cowan replaced Guy Willoughby who resigned from his role as chief executive of the trust on 11 August 2014.

== Support and financing ==
HALO's income in 2021-22 was £93.5 million up from £25.63 million in 2015-16. It receives support from the UK, US and other governments including Finland, Norway, Germany, Netherlands, Ireland and New Zealand. In April 2017, the UK announced it would provide £100 million in funding for global landmine programmes for the next three years. In 2021 the Foreign, Commonwealth and Development Office announced plans to cut funding for landmine clearance from £100 million to £25 million.

== Achievements ==
The HALO Trust has destroyed over 1.5 million landmines, over 11 million pieces of large calibre ordnance and over 200,000 cluster munitions. Around 10,800 minefields have been cleared and 87,316 acres (353.36 km^{2}) have been made safe from landmines, with another 361,956 acres (1,464.78 km^{2}) made safe from unexploded and abandoned ordnance.

=== Awards ===
In 2012, HALO was named the Overall Winner in the Charity Awards by Civil Society Media.

== Africa ==
=== Angola ===
For more than 40 years, the population of Angola has been severely impacted by landmines and other explosive remnants of war (ERW), and is believed to still be one of the most mined countries in the world. Between 1962 and 1972, it is believed that there were a total of 2,571 landmine incidents in Angola. Estimates for the total number of ERW casualties in Angola vary hugely, from 23,000 to 80,000.

HALO has worked in Angola since 1994. Considerable progress is being made; even so, HALO estimates that there is still in the region of 10 years' work to rid Angola of all landmines.

To tackle the threat from anti-tank mines on roads, HALO developed the Road Threat Reduction (RTR) system. RTR is a two part process: first, systematic sweeps are made with a large detector to find metal-cased AT mines; this is followed by heavy detonation trailers designed to detonate any minimum metal mine still capable of operating. HALO also fields Weapons & Ammunition Disposal teams working in support of the Angolan army, navy, air force and police to manage the considerable stocks of weapons and ammunition that were amassed during the Angolan Civil War.

By 2015 HALO had cleared more than 780 minefields (21,500 hectares [53,000 acres] of land) and destroyed more than 90,000 landmines and 160,000 items of unexploded ordnance. The majority of munitions destroyed is made up of aircraft bombs but also includes guided missiles and cluster bomb sub-munitions. More than a decade after the end of the war, accidents continue to occur and communities continue to be impacted by the threat of mines.

=== Mozambique ===
The Government of Mozambique announced that the country was free of all known landmines in September 2015.

In September 2015, when Mozambique declared itself free of all known landmines, HALO announced that it had cleared 171,000 of the country's landmines and employed 1,600 Mozambican men and women over the course of 22 years.

=== Somalia ===
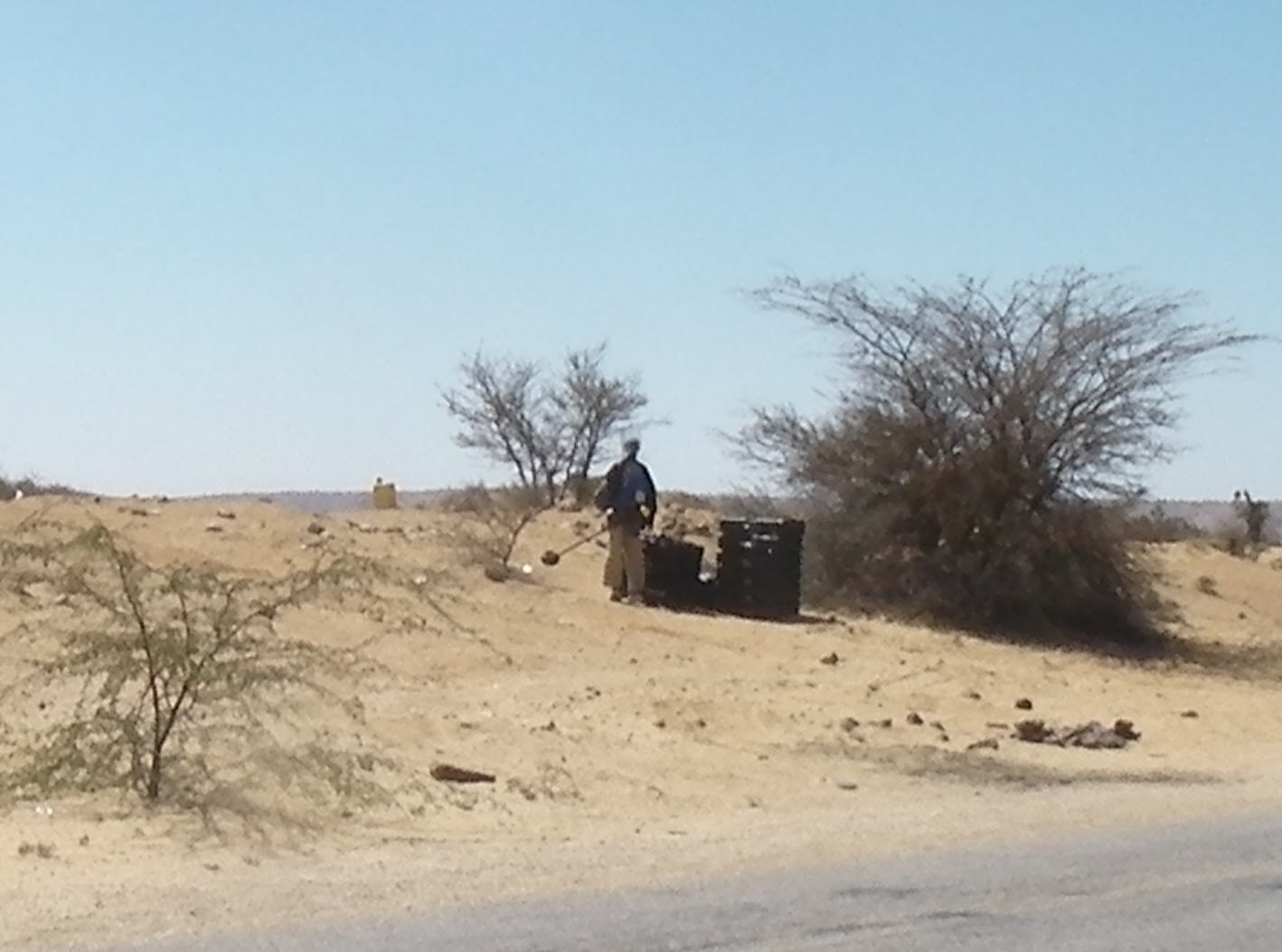
Mine removal operation northeast of Hargeisa

Somaliland is an unrecognised de facto independent state located in northwest Somalia in the Horn of Africa.

Minelaying occurred during the 1964 Ethiopian–Somali Border War and 1977-78 Ogaden War with Ethiopia, when minefields were laid predominantly along the Ethiopian border. This border and important access routes were heavily mined.

== Asia ==
=== Caucasus ===
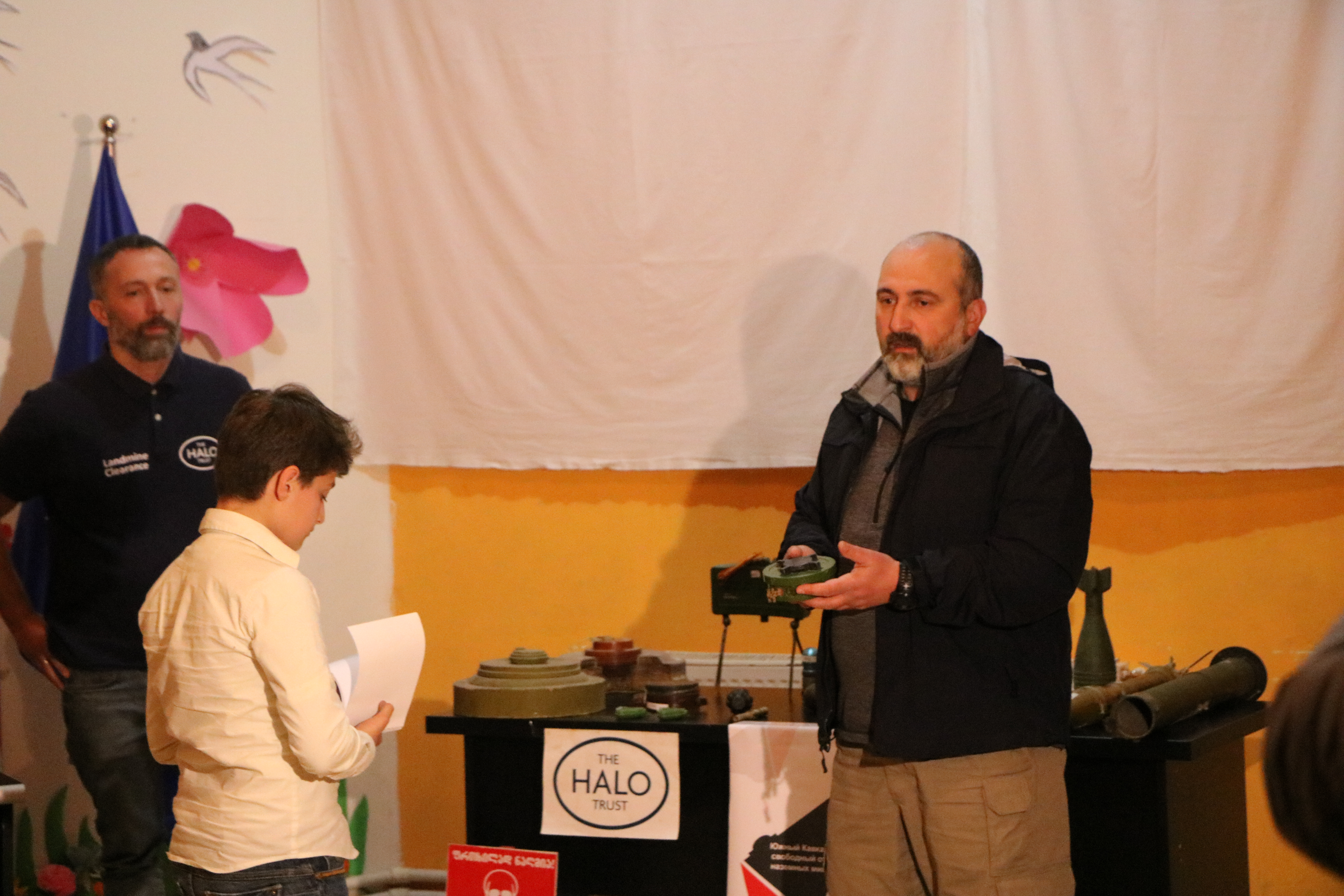
HALO Trust staff members explaining the danger of mines to school students in Tbilisi during the "Landsmine Free Caucasus" campaign organized by the Europe-Georgia Institute

==== Soviet Legacy minefields ====
In 2009, a national survey of minefields remaining in Georgia found a total of 15 contaminated sites. Of these 15, ten are identified as having a direct humanitarian impact. The clearance of minefields surrounding former Soviet military installations in Georgia is often complicated by significant quantities of waste and rubble. HALO have mechanical mine clearance techniques to clear such sites using adapted civil engineering plant such as armoured excavators and front-loading shovels.

==== Cluster munitions and other UXO ====
The American NGO CNFA partnered with HALO to target the delivery of agricultural assistance to the farmers of Shida Kartli; this resulted in the region's largest ever apple and wheat harvests.

HALO completed work in this region in December 2009 having cleared 3,402 hectares (8,410 acres) of land across 22 communities. 1,706 cluster munitions and 2,031 other items of ordnance were located and destroyed.

==== Nagorno Karabakh ====
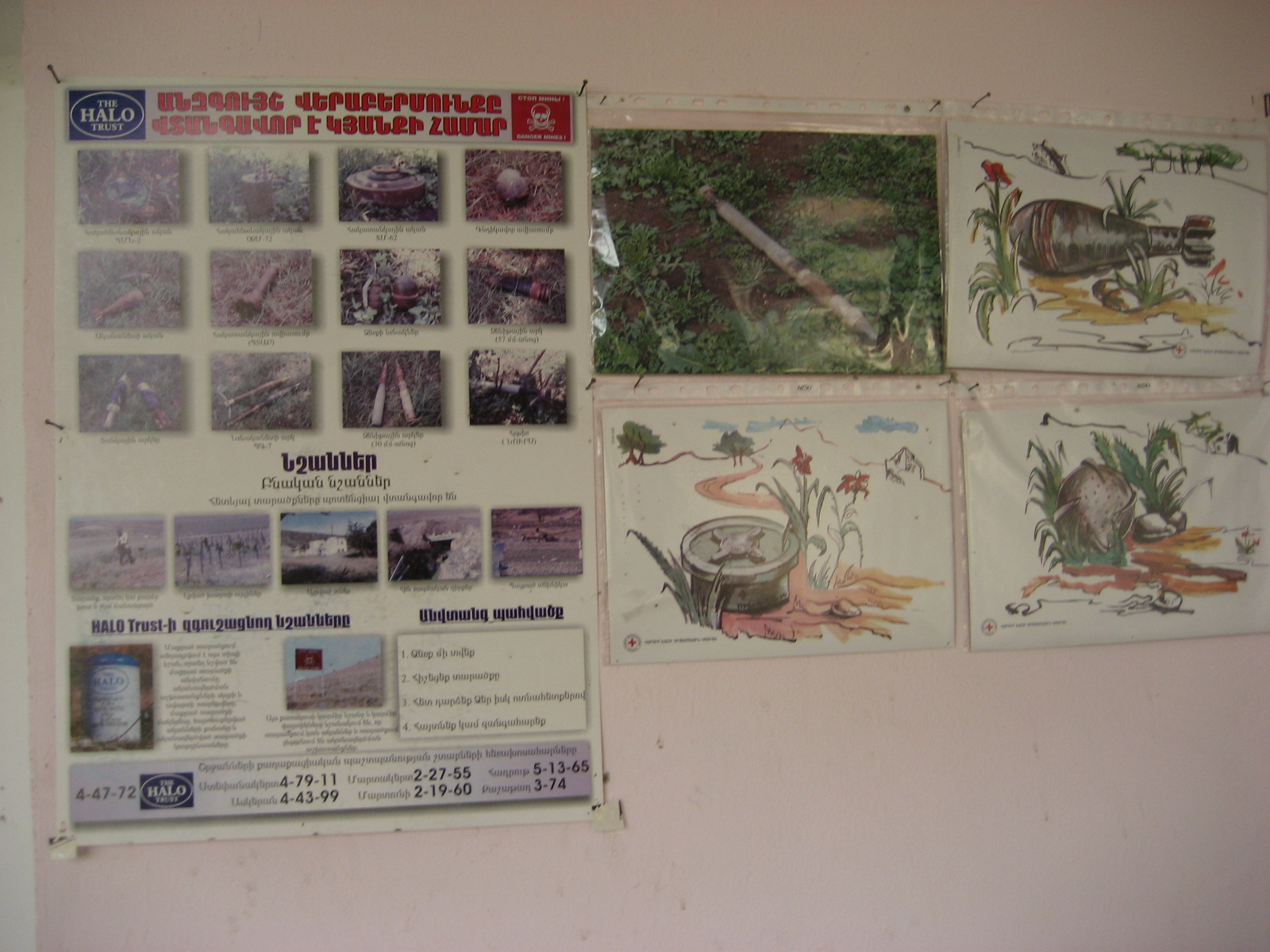
School posters in Karabakh educating children on mines and UXO

Since 2000 HALO has provided the only large-scale mine clearance capacity in Nagorno Karabakh and over the last 10 years HALO has cleared over 236 square kilometres of contaminated land and returned it to previously impacted communities. By mid-2010, HALO had found and destroyed in Nagorno Karabakh over 10,000 landmines, 10,000 cluster munitions and 45,000 other explosive items.

In July 2011 Azerbaijani government blacklisted and banned the organization from Azerbaijan in protest for its mine clearing operation in disputed territory of Nagorno Karabakh. Mine removal equipment that was headed to Afghanistan was impounded and sent to Georgia.

Representative of the leader of Nagorno-Karabakh on special assignments Boris Avagyan claimed that HALO Trust handed over minefield maps to Turkish special services, which, according to him, helped Azerbaijan’s successful military operations during the second Karabakh war in the autumn of 2020. Ayvagyan claimed that under the pretext of studying dangerous areas, this organization carried out reconnaissance work throughout the territory of Nagorno-Karabakh. Opposition MP Naira Zohrabyan supported these claims. The spokesperson for the de facto president of the Republic of Nagorno-Karabakh said that Ayvagyan's accusations do not represent the opinion of the government and that he was acting unilaterally. HALO Trust said the accusation was "an absolute lie".

==== Chechnya ====
In 1997, HALO began working in Chechnya, training Chechens to remove landmines placed in the 1994–1996 war between Chechnya and Russia. It was forced to stop after a second war broke out and four deminers were killed by rocket artillery. Russia accused HALO of providing rebels with military training, but HALO representatives denied the charge, stating that they only provided their standard training in demining.

=== Middle East ===
==== Jesus' baptism site ====
In May 2016 HALO announced that it had secured approval from the Israeli and Palestinian authorities as well as eight religious denominations to clear landmines from the claimed site of the Baptism of Christ at Qasr al-Yahud (West Bank) / Al-Maghtas (Jordan).

=== Southeast Asia ===
==== Cambodia ====
Over 63,500 landmine and ERW casualties have been recorded in Cambodia since 1979, with over 25,000 amputees Cambodia has the highest ratio per capita in the world. Despite a considerable reduction in casualty numbers over recent years, down from 875 in 2005 to 269 in 2008, Cambodia's mine and ERW problem still represents a major impediment to the social and economic development of the country. However, given more than 18 years of humanitarian demining, the landmine threat is now largely concentrated in just 21 north-west border districts.

IN 2010 HALO Cambodia had over 1,150 national staff working in the provinces of Battambang, Banteay Meanchey, Otdar Meanchey and Pailin. Recruiting, training and then deploying female and male deminers from the mine affected districts means that the landmine contaminated communities remain an integral component in the clearance process. Living and working in these communities, deminers are methodically ridding Cambodia of the landmine menace.

Between 1991 and May 2010, HALO Cambodia cleared over 6,115 hectares (15,110 acres) of landmine contaminated land whilst destroying over 229,000 landmines, 139,200 items of large calibre ammunition and 1.28 million bullets.

Alongside clearance work HALO's survey teams have continued to systematically clarify the nature and magnitude of landmine contamination in Cambodia. The current focus of HALO's survey teams is the Baseline Survey of Cambodia, a Cambodian Mine Action and Victim Assistance Authority (CMAA) led process to quantify the true nature of the remaining mine threat in Cambodia.

==== Laos ====
One of the results of the Vietnam War (1964 to 1973) is the magnitude of the UXO problem remaining in Laos. During the conflict, the country was subject to heavy aerial bombardment, resulting in the world's largest contamination from unexploded submunitions. The US estimates that it dropped over 2 million tons of bombs, including 270 million cluster munitions (known locally as "bombies"), during this period. During the same period, an unknown number of anti-personnel and anti-tank mines were laid along the country's borders and around military bases and airfields.

While the number of mine and UXO related accidents continue to decrease from over 200 per year in the 1990s to about 50 in 2018, over 25% of all villages in Laos still remain contaminated, primarily with UXO.

HALO's survey, explosive ordnance disposal (EOD) and UXO clearance program is focused on the four most contaminated districts in Savannakhet Province. As of 2017, its staff numbered 303 (45% women), forming 10 clearance teams and 14 survey teams. For 2018 it had permission to expand the efforts to 14 districts for a total of 538 villages.

=== South and Central Asia ===
==== Afghanistan ====
On 9 June 2021, a HALO Trust De-Mining Team was reportedly attacked in Afghanistan, with 10 team members killed and more than a dozen wounded. The Afghanistan government blamed the Taliban for the attack. The militant group denied any responsibility. HALO Trust stated that the Taliban actually came to their aid and scared off the assailants. ISIL-K claimed credit for the attack.

==== Sri Lanka ====
HALO has been working in Sri Lanka since 2002, with 1,045 demining staff currently in the provinces of Jaffna, Kilinochchi and Mulaittivu. HALO teams conduct manual and mechanical mine clearance alongside survey and explosive ordnance disposal (EOD). In December 2015 The HALO Trust announced that it had cleared 200,000 landmines in Sri Lanka.

== Europe ==
=== Kosovo ===
Mine laying, predominantly by the army of the Former Republic of Yugoslavia but also by the Kosovo Liberation Army, took place primarily in 1999. In addition to the many items of UXO resulting from the conflict, the NATO bombing campaign in 1999 left unexploded cluster munitions in many locations across Kosovo.

HALO maintained demining and battle area clearance operations between 2004 and 2006 and conducted a country-wide Community Liaison Survey in 2006 and 2007. This survey identified 126 areas still in need of clearance, above and beyond the 46 areas recorded in the national database. HALO commenced a third phase of clearance operations in May 2008.

In total since 1999, HALO has cleared over 38 hectares (94 acres) of mine contaminated land and 1,263 hectares (3,120 acres) of cluster munition contaminated land. In the process, HALO has destroyed 4,330 mines and 5,377 cluster submunitions and other explosive items.

Cluster munitions have an impact upon infrastructure projects and HALO has found and destroyed cluster munitions to clear the way for road widening projects. Occasionally clearance cannot keep up with development and at least one cluster munition was uncovered by road construction teams in 2010.

The World Bank's Kosovo Poverty Assessment 2007 classifies 45 per cent of Kosovo's population as "poor", living on less than €1.42 per day, with a further 18 per cent considered to be vulnerable to poverty. 15% of the population is extremely poor, which is defined as "individuals who have difficulty meeting their basic nutritional needs".

HALO currently has three teams and a total of 65 demining staff accredited and deployed clearing minefields and cluster munition strikes.

=== Ukraine ===
HALO began operations in Ukraine in 2015 and has been involved in clearing landmines and other explosive remnants of war resulting from the Russo-Ukrainian War. Since the Russian invasion in February 2022, HALO has continued to conduct clearance operations across Ukraine and employs approximately 1,500 Ukrainian staff, nearly 30% of whom are women.

== South America ==
=== Colombia ===
The Colombian military have now completed clearance of 31 of the minefields they laid but an estimated 10,000 suspected NSAG minefields remain. These have largely been the reason why Colombia now has similar landmine casualties to Afghanistan.

In 2013, Colombia had between 4.9 and 5.5 million internally displaced people (IDPs), the world's largest number. These populations are now experiencing high casualty and accident rates as they return to their areas of former residence.

The Colombian government formally invited HALO Trust in June 2009 to implement a large-scale civilian clearance program which is currently in the survey and assessment stages.

HALO is the first civilian organisation to have a formal agreement and registration with the Colombian government and is currently surveying prioritised mined areas in preparation for humanitarian clearance operations.
