= Vardan Ghukasyan =

Armenian politician

Vardan Kolya Ghukasyan (Armenian: Վարդան Կոլյայի Ղուկասյան; born 20 January 1961), is an Armenian politician and businessman, member of the Armenian Communist Party, deputy of the National Assembly of the Republic of Armenia (2017–2019) and Mayor of Gyumri from 2000 to 2012, and later from 16 April 2025. He sparked controversy when he called for a transgender activist to be burned alive. He has been repeatedly condemned for transphobic comments.

== Arrest ==
Police arrested Ghukasyan on 20 October 2025 on bribery charges. The country's Anti-Corruption Committee claims it has evidence that he accepted bribes to prevent the demolition of an illegal building in the city.

The ACC says Ghukasyan demanded 4 million AMD ($10,400) to let the building stand. The city's chief architect was also arrested as an accomplice in the case.
