= 2022 Armenian protests =

Protests against the prime minister

- Part of Armenian political crisis (2020–present)
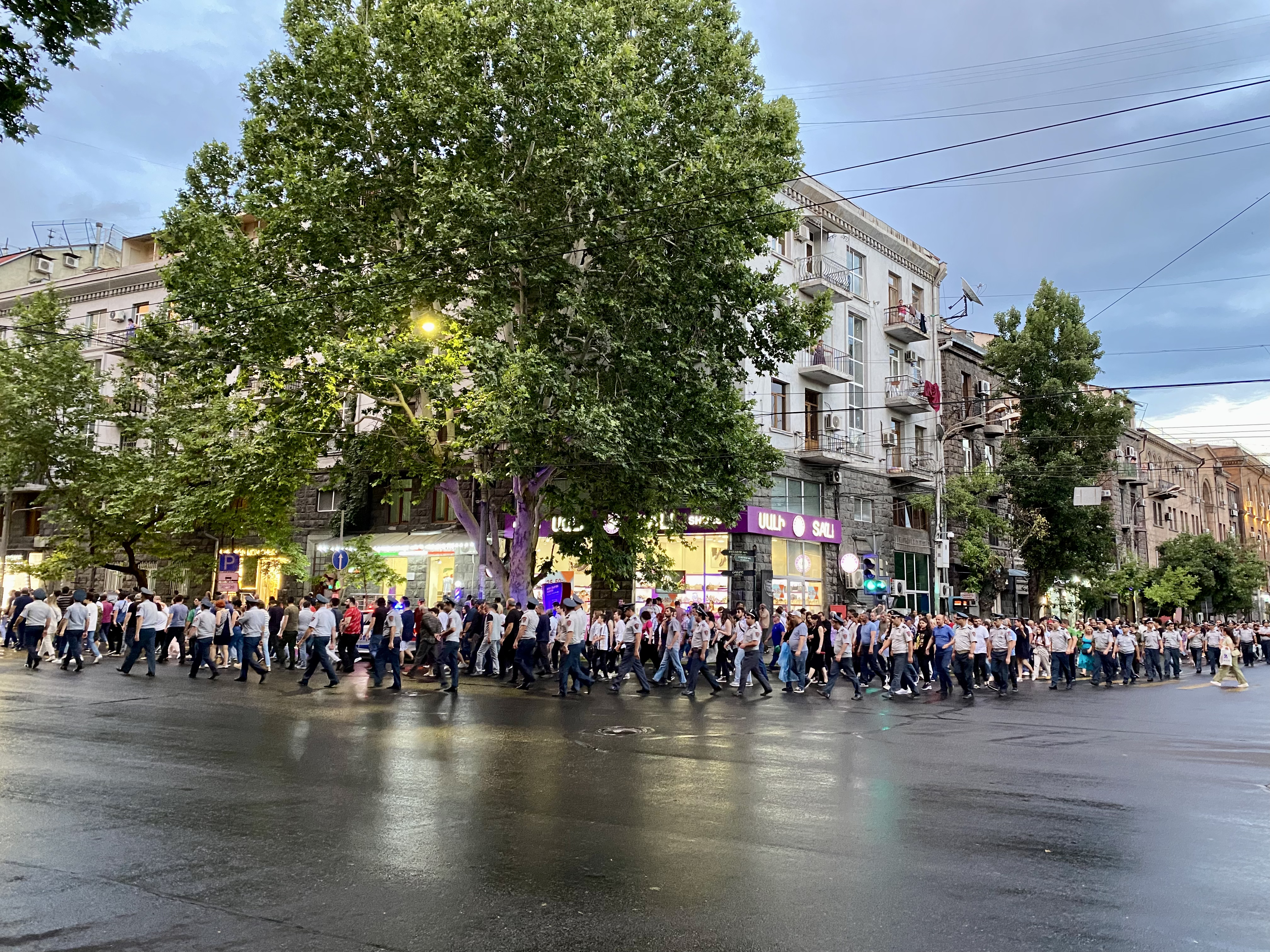
- Opposition protest in Yerevan, 11 June 2022
- Date: 5 April–19 June 2022
- Location: Armenia: Yerevan, Gyumri, Vanadzor
- Caused by: A cease-fire agreement signed by Prime Minister of Armenia Nikol Pashinyan
- Goals: Resignation of Prime Minister Nikol Pashinyan
- Methods: Demonstrations, civil unrest, street blockades, sit-ins, student protest, general strike
- Result: Failed attempt by opposition to seek resignation of Nikol Pashinyan

Parties
Resistance Movement; Armenia Alliance; Armenian Revolutionary Federation; Reborn Armenia; One Armenia Party; I Have Honor Alliance; Homeland Party; Republican Party of Armenia; National Agenda Party; 5165 National Conservative Movement Party; Apricot Country Party; Solidarity Party; Christian Democratic Union of Armenia; Intellectual Armenia Party; Freedom Party; National Security Party; National Christian Party; Shant Alliance Nationalist Party	Government of Armenia: Civil Contract; United Labour Party; Police; National Security Service; Pashinyan supporters; Guardians of the revolution; Supported by: Bright Armenia; Christian-Democratic Rebirth Party; Conservative Party; European Party of Armenia; Fair Armenia Party; Hanrapetutyun Party; Sovereign Armenia Party

Lead figures
Ishkhan Saghatelyan (Armenia) Artur Vanetsyan Other figures: (Armenia) Aram Vardevanyan; (Armenia) Vahe A. Hakobyan; (Armenia) Hayk Mamijanyan; Gegham Manukyan; (Armenia) Anna Mkrtchyan; (Armenia) Anna Grigoryan	(Armenia) Nikol Pashinyan (Prime Minister); Vahagn Khachaturyan (President) (Armenia) Vahe Ghazaryan (police chief)

Casualties
- Detained: ~2,100 people (as of 6 June 2022; according to opposition estimates)

The 2022 Armenian protests (also known as the Resistance Movement; Armenian: Դիմադրության շարժում, romanized: Dimadrut’yan sharzhum) were a series of anti-government protests in Armenia that started on 5 April 2022. The protests continued into June 2022, and many protesters were detained by police in Yerevan. Protestors demanded Prime Minister of Armenia Nikol Pashinyan resign over his handling of the Second Nagorno-Karabakh War. On 14 June 2022, the opposition announced their decision to terminate daily demonstrations aimed at toppling Prime Minister Nikol Pashinyan after failing to achieve popular support.

== Background ==
The 2020–2021 Armenian protests resulted in snap parliamentary elections being held on 20 June 2021. Following the election, Nikol Pashinyan's Civil Contract party won a supermajority in parliament and Pashinyan retained his position as Prime Minister. Meanwhile, on 13 March 2022, Vahagn Khachaturyan was sworn in as the new President of Armenia.

Protests began in early April 2022 over the implementation of the 2020 Nagorno-Karabakh ceasefire agreement and a potential peace treaty with Azerbaijan. Nikol Pashinyan and the President of Azerbaijan Ilham Aliyev met in Brussels, Belgium on 6 April 2022 for a joint summit hosted by the European Council. During the summit, both leaders agreed to prepare for negotiations on a bilateral peace agreement. It is feared that Artsakh would be ceded to Azerbaijan as part of a potential peace agreement.

Protesters called on Prime Minister Nikol Pashinyan to resign and for the government of Armenia to provide security guarantees to Artsakh and ensure that the territory is not conceded to Azerbaijan.

During a speech to the National Assembly on 22 April 2022, Nikol Pashinyan stated, "If we were to surrender Artsakh, we would not have spent tens of billions of drams to ensure the return of Artsakh residents to their homes after the 44-day war" and "Our strategy in the short, medium and long terms is as follows: to ensure a situation or solution whereby the people of Artsakh will continue to live in Artsakh."

On 23 May 2022, Armenian Prime Minister Nikol Pashinyan and Azerbaijani President Ilham Aliyev met with European Council President Charles Michel for a trilateral meeting in Brussels. The meeting focused on the peaceful resolution of the Nagorno-Karabakh conflict and the continued development of relations between Armenia and Azerbaijan with the European Union. The leaders agreed to establish a joint border commission, open international transport links, and prepare for a future peace treaty to be signed. European Council President Charles Michel further stated, "the rights and security of the ethnic Armenian population in Karabakh must be addressed." Charles Michel also confirmed that the EU would continue to support the economic development of both countries and support long-term sustainable peace in the Caucasus. Meanwhile, on 24 May 2022, the EU's High Representative of the Union for Foreign Affairs and Security Policy, Josep Borrell welcomed the recent trilateral meeting and stated that, "The EU continues to be strongly engaged in peace and reconciliation efforts in the region."

On 16 June 2022, the opposition "Resistance Movement" announced the ending of daily protests after failing to gain traction and participation in the protests. Opposition MPs who had been skipping parliament sessions since mid-April confirmed the ending of their parliamentary boycott.

== Events ==
=== April 2022 ===
On 25 April, Anna Grigoryan, a member of the Armenia Alliance of the National Assembly, started a march from the village of Tigranashen in the Ararat region to Yerevan with a group of citizens.

On 27 April, a protest was held outside the Armenian Parliament.

=== May 2022 ===
On 4 May, protesters blocked major roads in Yerevan. Several rallies were also held outside of parliament.

On 10 May, 61 protesters were arrested in Yerevan.

On 15 May, the Armenian government unveiled their plans for normalisation of relations with Azerbaijan. Edmon Marukyan, Armenia's Ambassador-at-large confirmed that Armenia and Azerbaijan would have to recognize each other's borders, refrain from threats to each other's security, establish diplomatic relations, open transport links and cooperate in areas of mutual interest. Meanwhile, Armenia's Foreign Minister Ararat Mirzoyan said there was nothing unacceptable in Azerbaijan's proposals but stressed that the rights and freedoms of the citizens of Artsakh must be protected. Armenia had also requested that the peace negotiations should be organized by the OSCE Minsk Group.

On 16 May, 91 protesters were arrested. The same day Russian President Vladimir Putin met with Prime Minister Pashinyan to discuss regional issues.

On 18 May, protestors disrupted service on the Yerevan Metro, causing trains to cease operation. The metro system had been reopened one hour later.

On 23 May, two protestors ran on stage waving the flag of Artsakh during the opening ceremony of the European Boxing Championships in Yerevan.

On 24 May, Armenian and Azeri delegations met at the border to discuss the peace process. On the same day, protestors blocked the entrance to the Ministry of Foreign Affairs in an attempt to prevent employees from entering the building.

On 31 May, 100 demonstrators were detained in Yerevan.

=== June 2022 ===
On 3 June, protestors clashed with police in Yerevan. Protestors threw stones and bottles at the police, which was followed by the use of stun grenades by the police. 34 police officers were hospitalized and 16 civilians were injured.

On 9 June, the opposition staged a protest outside the Foreign Ministry in Yerevan. On 10 June, a protest was held outside the presidential palace.

On 16 June, the opposition dismantled a tent camp in central France Square.

On 19 June, an incident took place in the Nigavan village of Aragatsotn Province, involving a group of people. During that time, a shot was fired. Seven people sustained gunshot wounds, with one dying of their injuries and at least two more in critical condition. Another man later died from his injuries. Some news outlets reported that the shooting was initiated by a relatives of Civil Contract MPs, who fired Kalashnikov rifles at a group of youth protestors for insulting Pashinyan. The police and Civil Contract have denied that information, with the police stating that the cause of the shooting was "domestic".

== Response ==
- Artsakh: President of Artsakh Arayik Harutyunyan stated that, "No document on the status of Artsakh is being discussed at this stage" and following a meeting with Nikol Pashinyan that, "the two leaders have a clear agreement that in case of any discussion on the future status of Artsakh at the international level, the position of the Armenian side must be agreed upon with the Artsakh authorities and people."
- Azerbaijan: The Minister of Foreign Affairs Jeyhun Bayramov reportedly "echoed Armenian authorities' statements".
- European Union: European Council President Charles Michel held a telephone conversation with Prime Minister Nikol Pashinyan on 18 April 2022. The European Council President reiterated his support to Pashinyan's efforts to promote a peaceful, stable and secure South Caucasus.
- Organization for Security and Co-operation in Europe (OSCE): On 8 April 2022, the OSCE stated "The OSCE Chairmanship welcomes the meeting of the leaders of Armenia and Azerbaijan under the aegis of the President of the European Council and launching the process towards a possible peace agreement."
- Russia: The Russian Foreign Ministry spokesman said at a press briefing that the crisis was Armenia's internal affair.
- United States: The US Department of State has urged Armenian authorities to exercise restraint and encourages anti-government protesters to refrain from violence.

== See also ==
- Second Nagorno-Karabakh War
- 2020–2021 Armenian protests
- 2023 Armenian protests
- 2024 Armenian protests
