= List of pro-Russian political parties =

This is a list of pro-Russian political parties outside of Russia.

== By continent ==
=== Africa ===
==== Algeria ====
Name	Native name(s)	Government	Reference(s)
National Liberation Front	Arabic: جبهة التحرير الوطني French: Front de libération nationale	Government	

==== Democratic Republic of the Congo ====
Name	Native name(s)	Government	Reference(s)
Union of Democratic Socialists	French: Union des socialistes démocrates	Extra-parliamentary	

==== Eritrea ====
Name	Native name(s)	Government	Reference(s)
People's Front for Democracy and Justice	Tigrinya: ህዝባዊ ግንባር ንደሞክራስን ፍትሕን, romanized: Həzbawi Gənbar nəDämokrasən Fətəḥən	Government	

==== Kenya ====
Name	Native name(s)	Government	Reference(s)
Communist Party Marxist – Kenya	Swahili: Chama Cha Kikomunisti Marxist Kenya	Extra-parliamentary	

==== Morocco ====
Name	Native name(s)	Government	Reference(s)
Party of Progress and Socialism	Arabic: حزب التقدم والاشتراكية	Coalition	

==== South Africa ====
Name	Native name(s)	Government	Reference(s)
African National Congress		Government	
Economic Freedom Fighters		Opposition	

==== Tunisia ====
Name	Native name(s)	Government	Reference(s)
Tunisia Forward	Arabic: تونس إلى الأمام	Support	

==== Western Sahara ====
Name	Native name(s)	Government	Reference(s)
Polisario Front	Arabic: جبهة البوليساريو	Government	

=== Asia ===
==== Armenia ====
Name	Native name(s)	Reference(s)
Adequate Party	Armenian: Ադեկվադ, romanized: Adekvad	
Alliance Party	Armenian: Դաշինք կուսակցություն, romanized: Dashink’ kusakts’ut’yun)	
Armenia Alliance	Armenian: Հայաստան դաշինք, romanized: Hayastan dashink’	
Armenian Communist Party	Armenian: Հայաստանի կոմունիստական կուսակցություն, romanized: Hayastani Komunistakan Kusaktsutyun	
Armenian Eagles Unified Armenia Party	Armenian: Հայ Արծիվներ Միասնական Հայաստան կուսակցություն, romanized: Hay Artsivner Miasnakan Hayastan kusakts’ut’yun	
Armenia is Our Home	Armenian: Մեր տունը Հայաստանն է կուսակցություն, romanized: Mer tuny Hayastann e kusakts’ut’yun	
Armenian Revolutionary Federation	Armenian: Հայ Յեղափոխական Դաշնակցութիւն, romanized: Hay Heghapokhakan Dashnaktsutyun	
Constitutional Rights Union	Armenian: Սահմանադրական իրավունքների միություն, romanized: Sahmanadrakan iravunk’neri miut’yun	
Fair Armenia Party	Armenian: Արդար Հայաստան կուսակցություն, romanized: Ardar Hayastan kusakts’ut’yun	
For Social Justice	Armenian: Հանուն սոցիալական արդարության, romanized: Hanun sots’ialakan ardarut’yan	
Homeland of Armenians Party	Armenian: Հայերի հայրենիք կուսակցություն, romanized: Hayeri hayrenik’ kusakts’ut’yun	
I Have Honor Alliance	Armenian: Պատիվ ունեմ դաշինք, romanized: Pativ unem dashink’	
National Unity	Armenian: Ազգային միաբանություն, romanized: Azgayin Miabanutyun	
New Times	Armenian: Նոր Ժամանակներ, romanized: Nor Zhamanakner	
Prosperous Armenia	Armenian: Բարգավաճ Հայաստան, romanized: Bargavach Hayastan	
Republican Party of Armenia	Armenian: Հայաստանի Հանրապետական Կուսակցություն, romanized: Hayastani Hanrapetakan Kusaktsutyun	
Social Democrat Hunchakian Party	Armenian: Սոցիալ Դեմոկրատ Հնչակյան Կուսակցություն, romanized: Sots’ial Demokrat Hnch’akyan Kusakts’ut’yun	
Towards Russia Party	Armenian: Ուժեղ Հայաստան Ռուսաստանի հետ, romanized: Uzhegh Hayastan Rrusastani het	
United Homeland Party	Armenian: Միացյալ հայրենիք կուսակցություն, romanized: Miats’yal hayrenik’ kusakts’ut’yun	
Voice of the Nation	Armenian: Ազգի ձայն, romanized: Azgi dzayn	
Strong Armenia	Armenian: Ուժեղ Հայաստան, romanized: Uzhegh Hayastan	

==== Azerbaijan ====
Name	Native name(s)	Government	Reference(s)
New Azerbaijan Party	Azerbaijani: Yeni Azərbaycan Partiyası	Government	

==== Cambodia ====
Name	Native name(s)	Government	Reference(s)
Cambodian People's Party	Khmer: គណបក្សប្រជាជនកម្ពុជា	Government	

==== Georgia ====
Name	Native name(s)	Government	Reference(s)
Alliance of Patriots of Georgia	Georgian: საქართველოს პატრიოტთა ალიანსი, romanized: sakartvelos p'at'riot'ta aliansi	Extra-parliamentary	
Ancestral Lights (Note: Within the partially-recognized state of Abkhazia, which is recognized by most countries as part of Georgia.)	Abkhaz: Амцахара, romanized: Amtsakhara Georgian: ამცახარა, romanized: amtsakhara	Coalition (Parliament of Abkhazia)	
Conservative Movement/Alt-Info	Georgian: კონსერვატიული მოძრაობა/ალტ-ინფო, romanized: k'onservat'iuli modzraoba/alt'-inpo	Deregistered	
Conservatives for Georgia	Georgian: კონსერვატორები საქართველოსთვის, romanized: k'onservat'orebi sakartvelostvis	Extra-parliamentary	
Forum for the National Unity of Abkhazia	Abkhaz: Аԥсны Жәлар Ракзаара Афорум, romanized: Aṕsny Ža̋lar Rakzaara Aforum, Russian: Форум Народного единства Абхазии, Forum Narodnogo Yedinstva Abkhazii, Georgian: აფხაზეთის ეროვნული ერთიანობის ფორუმი, romanized: apkhazetis erovnuli ertianobis porumi	Extra-parliamentary	
Georgian Dream – Democratic Georgia	Georgian: ქართული ოცნება – დემოკრატიული საქართველო, romanized: kartuli otsneba – demok'rat'iuli sakartvelo	Government	
Georgian Idea	Georgian: ქართული იდეა, romanized: kartuli idea		
Georgian Troupe	Georgian: ქართული დასი, romanized: kartuli dasi	Extra-parliamentary	
Revival	Abkhaz: Аиҭаира, romanized: Aitaira Georgian: აითაირა, romanized: aitaira	Coalition (Parliament of Abkhazia)	
United Ossetia (Note: Within the partially-recognized state of South Ossetia, which is recognized by most countries as part of Georgia.)	Iron Ossetic: Иугонд Ир, romanized: Uigond Ir Russian: Единая Осетия, romanized: Yedinaya Osetiya Georgian: ერთიანი ოსეთი, romanized: ertiani oseti	Opposition (Parliament of South Ossetia)	
Unity	Georgian: ერთობა, romanized: ertoba		
Unity Party	Iron Ossetic: Иудзинад, romanized: Iudzinad, Russian: Единство, Yedinstvo, Georgian: ერთიანობა, romanized: ertianoba	Extra-parliamentary	

==== Japan ====
Name	Native name(s)	Government	Reference(s)
Happiness Realization Party	Japanese: 幸福実現党	Extra-parliamentary	

==== Kyrgyzstan ====
Name	Native name(s)	Reference(s)
Alliance	Kyrgyz: Альянс, romanized: Alyans	
Ar-Namys (Dignity)	Kyrgyz: Ар-Намыс, romanized: Ar-Namys	
Social Democratic Party of Kyrgyzstan	Kyrgyz: Кыргызстан социал-дeмoкратиялык пaртиясы, romanized: Kyrgyzstan social-demokratiyalyk partiyasy, Russian: Социал-демократическая партия Кыргызстана, romanized: Sotsial-demokraticheskaya partiya Kyrgyzstana	

==== Myanmar ====
Name	Native name(s)	Government	Reference(s)
Union Solidarity and Development Party	Burmese: ပြည်ထောင်စုကြံ့ခိုင်ရေးနှင့် ဖွံ့ဖြိုးရေးပါတီ	Government	

==== Nepal ====
Name	Native name(s)	Government	Reference(s)
Nepali Communist Party	Nepali: नेपाली कम्युनिष्ट पार्टी, romanized: Nēpālī kamyuniṣṭa pārṭī	Opposition	

==== North Korea ====
Name	Native name(s)	Government	Reference(s)
Workers' Party of Korea	Korean: 조선로동당	Government	

==== Pakistan ====
Name	Native name(s)	Government	Reference(s)
Pakistan Muslim League (Nawaz)	Urdu: پاکستان مسلم لیگ (ن)	Government	

==== South Korea ====
Name	Native name(s)	Government	Reference(s)
People's Democracy Party	Korean: 민중민주당	Extra-parliamentary	

==== Syria ====
Name	Native name(s)	Government	Reference(s)
Arab Socialist Ba'ath Party	Arabic: حزب البعث العربي الاشتراكي – قطر سوريا, romanized: Ḥizb al-Ba'th al-'Arabī al-Ishtirākī	Banned and dissolved	
Syrian Social Nationalist Party	Arabic: الحزب السوري القومي الاجتماعي, romanized: al-Ḥizb al-Sūrī al-Qawmī al-ijtimāʻī	Banned	

==== Tajikistan ====
Name	Native name(s)	Government	Reference(s)
People's Democratic Party of Tajikistan	Tajik: Ҳизби халқии демократии Тоҷикистон, romanized: Ḩizbi halķii demokratii Toçikiston	Government	

=== Europe ===
==== Austria ====
Name	Native name(s)	Government	Reference(s)
Freedom Party of Austria	German: Freiheitliche Partei Österreichs	Opposition	

==== Belarus ====
Name	Native name(s)	Government	Reference(s)
Belarusian Social Sporting Party	Russian: Белорусская социально-спортивная партия, romanized: Byelorusskaya sotsial'no-sportivnaya partiya, Belarusian: Беларуская сацыяльна-спартыўная партыя, romanized: Bielaruskaja sacyjaĺna-spartyŭnaja partyja	Extra-parliamentary	
Belaya Rus (White Rus)	Russian: Белая Русь, romanized: Belaya Rus', Belarusian: Белая Русь, romanized: Bielaja Ruś	Government	
Communist Party of Belarus	Russian: Коммунисти́ческая па́ртия Белару́си, romanized: Kommunisticheskaya Partiya Belarusi, Belarusian: Камуністы́чная па́ртыя Белару́сі, romanized: Kamunistyčnaja Partyja Bielarusi	Support	
Liberal Democratic Party of Belarus	Russian: Либерально-демократическая партия Беларуси, romanized: Liberal'no-demokraticheskaya partiya Belarusi, Belarusian: Ліберальна-дэмакратычная партыя Беларусі, romanized: Libieraĺna-demakratyčnaja partyja Bielarusi	Support	
Republican Party of Labour and Justice	Russian: Республиканская партия труда и справедливости, romanized: Respublikanskaya partiya truda i spravedlivosti, Belarusian: Рэспубліканская партыя працы і справядлівасьці, romanized: Respublikanskaja partyja pracy i spraviadlivaści	Support	

==== Belgium ====
Name	Native name(s)	Government	Reference(s)
Nation	Walloon: Mouvmint NÅCION	Extra-parliamentary	
Flanders and Identity	Dutch: Vlaanderen Identitair	Extra-parliamentary	

==== Bosnia and Herzegovina ====
Name	Native name(s)	Government	Reference(s)
Alliance of Independent Social Democrats	Serbian: Савез независних социјалдемократа, romanized: Savez nezavisnih socijaldemokrata	Coalition	

==== Bulgaria ====
Name	Native name(s)	Government	Reference(s)
Attack	Bulgarian: Атака, romanized: Ataka	Extra-parliamentary	
Bulgarian Rise	Bulgarian: Български възход, romanized: Balgarski vazhod	Extra-parliamentary	
Bulgarian Communist Party	Bulgarian: Българска комунистическа партия, romanized: Balgarska komunisticheska partiya	Extra-parliamentary	
Bulgarian Socialist Party	Bulgarian: Българска социалистическа партия, romanized: Balgarska Sotsialisticheska Partiya	Extra-parliamentary	
Morality, Unity, Honour	Bulgarian: Морал, Единство, Чест, romanized: Moral, Edinstvo, Chest	Extra-parliamentary	
Party of the Bulgarian Communists	Bulgarian: Партия на Българските комунисти, romanized: Partiya na Bulgarskite Komunisti	Extra-parliamentary	
Revival	Bulgarian: Възраждане, romanized: Vazrazhdane	Opposition	
Russophiles for the Revival of the Fatherland	Bulgarian: Русофили за възраждане на Отечеството, romanized: Rusofili za vazrazhdane na Otechestvoto	Extra-parliamentary	
Velichie	Bulgarian: Величие, romanized: Velichie	Extra-parliamentary	
Progressive Bulgaria	Bulgarian: Прогресивна България, romanized: Progresivna Balgariya	Government	

==== Czech Republic ====
Name	Native name(s)	Government	Reference(s)
Czech Republic in First Place!	Czech: Česká republika na prvním místě!	Extra-parliamentary	
Freedom and Direct Democracy	Czech: Svoboda a přímá demokracie	Coalition	
Enough!	Czech: Stačilo!	Extra-parliamentary	
Communist Party of Bohemia and Moravia	Czech: Komunistická strana Čech a Moravy	Extra-parliamentary	
National Democracy	Czech: Národní demokracie	Extra-parliamentary	
Workers' Party of Social Justice	Czech: Dělnická strana sociální spravedlnosti	Dissolved	

==== Denmark ====
Name	Native name(s)	Government	Reference(s)
Hard Line	Danish: Stram Kurs	Extra-parliamentary	
Party of the Danes	Danish: Danskernes Parti	Dissolved	

==== Estonia ====
Name	Native name(s)	Government	Reference(s)
Estonian Centre Party	Estonian: Eesti Keskerakond	Opposition	
Together	Estonian: Koos	Extra-parliamentary	

==== Finland ====
Name	Native name(s)	Government	Reference(s)
Power Belongs to the People	Finnish: Valta kuuluu kansalle	Extra-parliamentary	
Truth Party	Finnish: Totuuspuolue	Extra-parliamentary	
Freedom Aliance	Finnish: Vapauden Liitto	Extra-parliamentary	

==== France ====
Name	Native name(s)	Government	Reference(s)
National Rally	French: Rassemblement National	Opposition	
La France Insoumise	French: La France Insoumise	Opposition	
The Patriots	French: Les Patriotes	Extra-parliamentary	
The Nationalists	French: Les Nationalistes	Extra-parliamentary	
Jeanne Committees	French: Comités Jeanne	Extra-parliamentary	
The French Dissent	French: La Dissidence Française	Dissolved	

==== Germany ====
Name	Native name(s)	Government	Reference(s)
Arminius - Association of the German People	German: Arminius-Bund des deutschen Volkes	Extra-parliamentary	
Alternative for Germany	German: Alternative für Deutschland	Opposition	
Sahra Wagenknecht Alliance	German: Bündnis Sahra Wagenknecht – Vernunft und Gerechtigkeit	Opposition	
Freie Sachsen	German: Freie Sachsen	Extra-parliamentary	
The Homeland	German: Die Heimat	Extra-parliamentary	

==== Greece ====
Name	Native name(s)	Government	Reference(s)
Golden Dawn	Greek: Λαϊκός Σύνδεσμος – Χρυσή Αυγή, romanized: Laïkós Sýndesmos – Chrysí Avgí	Banned	
Greek Solution	Greek: Ελληνική Λύση, romanized: Ellinikí Lýsi	Opposition	
Victory	Greek: Νίκη, romanized: Níki	Opposition	
Agricultural Livestock Party of Greece	Greek: Αγροτικό Κτηνοτροφικό Κόμμα Ελλάδας, romanized: Agrotikó Ktinotrofikó Kómma Elládas	Extra-parliamentary	
Popular Greek Patriotic Union	Greek: Λαϊκή Ελληνική Πατριωτική Ένωση	Extra-parliamentary	
National Popular Consciousness	Greek: Εθνική Λαϊκή Συνείδηση, romanized: Ethnikí Laïkí Syneídisi	Dissolved	

==== Hungary ====
Name	Native name(s)	Government	Reference(s)
Fidesz – Hungarian Civic Alliance	Hungarian: Fidesz – Magyar Polgári Szövetség	Opposition	
Our Homeland Movement	Hungarian: Mi Hazánk Mozgalom	Opposition	
Hungarian Workers' Party	Hungarian: Magyar Munkáspárt	Extra-parliamentary	
Sixty-Four Counties Youth Movement	Hungarian: Hatvannégy Vármegye Ifjúsági Mozgalom	Extra-parliamentary	

==== Ireland ====
Name	Native name(s)	Government	Reference(s)
Workers' Party	Irish: Pairti na nOibrithe	Extra-parliamentary	
Irish Republican Socialist Party	Irish: Pairti Poblachtach Soisalach na h-Eireann	Extra-parliamentary	

==== Italy ====
Name	Native name(s)	Government	Reference(s)
Five Star Movement	Italian: Movimento 5 Stelle	Opposition	
League	Italian: Lega	Coalition	
New Force	Italian: Forza Nuova	Extra-parliamentary	
Italian Communist Party	Italian: Partito Comunista Italiano	Extra-parliamentary	
Loyalty and Action	Italian: Lealtà e Azione	Extra-parliamentary	
National Movement – The Network of the Patriots	Italian: Movimento Nazionale - La Rete dei Patrioti	Extra-parliamentary	
Communist Party of Popular Unity	Italian: Partito Comunista di Unità Popolare	Extra-parliamentary	

==== Latvia ====
Name	Native name(s)	Government	Reference(s)
For Stability!	Latvian: Stabilitātei!, Russian: Стабильность!, romanized: Stabil'nost'!	Opposition	
Latvian Russian Union	Latvian: Latvijas Krievu Savienība, Russian: Русский союз Латвии, romanized: Russkiy Soyuz Latvii	Opposition	
Social Democratic Party "Harmony"	Latvian: Sociāldemokrātiskā partija "Saskaņa", Russian: Социал-демократическая партия «Согласие», romanized: Sotsial-Demokraticheskaya Partiya "Soglasiye"	Extra-parliamentary	
Socialist Party of Latvia	Latvian: Latvijas Sociālistiskā partija, Russian: Социалистическая партия Латвии, romanized: Sotsialisticheskaya Partiya Latvii	Extra-parliamentary	

==== Lithuania ====
Name	Native name(s)	Government	Reference(s)
Front Party / Socialist People's Front	Lithuanian: Fronto partija Lithuanian: Socialistinis liaudies frontas	Dissolved	
Lithuanian People's Party	Lithuanian: Lietuvos Liaudies Partija	Extra-parliamentary	
Lithuanian People Party	Lithuanian: Lietuvos Žmonių Partija	Dissolved	

==== Moldova ====
Name	Native name(s)	Government	Reference(s)
Chance. Duties. Realization.	Romanian: Șansă. Obligații. Realizări.	Opposition	
Liberal Democratic Party of Transnistria (Note: Within the unrecognised state of Transnistria, which is internationally recognised as part of Moldova. In this region, the Romanian language is constitutionally referred to as "Moldovan" and uses the Cyrillic script.)	Russian: Либерально-демократическая партия Республики Приднестровье, romanized: Liberalno-Demokraticheskaya Partiya Respubliki Pridnestrov'e	Extra-parliamentary	
Obnovlenie (Renewal)	Russian: Обновление, romanized: Obnovleniye	Government	
Party of Communists of the Republic of Moldova	Romanian: Partidul Comuniștilor din Republica Moldova	Opposition	
Party of Socialists of the Republic of Moldova	Romanian: Partidul Socialiștilor din Republica Moldova	Opposition	
Proriv	Russian: Прорыв, romanized: Proryv	Banned	
Republic	Russian: Республика, romanized: Respublika	Opposition	
Revival Party	Romanian: Partidul Renaștere	Opposition	
Socialist Party of Moldova	Romanian: Partidul Socialist din Moldova		
Șor Party	Romanian: Partidul Șor	Opposition	
Victory	Romanian: Victorie	Opposition	

==== Montenegro ====
Name	Native name(s)	Government	Reference(s)
Democratic People's Party	Serbian: Демократска народна партија, romanized: Demokratska narodna partija	Opposition	
Democratic Party of Unity	Montenegrin: Демократска странка јединства, romanized: Demokratska stranka jedinstva	Extra-parliamentary	
Serb List	Serbian: Српска листа, romanized: Srpska lista	Extra-parliamentary	

==== Netherlands ====
Name	Native name(s)	Government	Reference(s)
Party for Freedom	Dutch: Partij voor de Vrijheid	Opposition	
Forum for Democracy	Dutch: Forum voor Democratie	Opposition	
Dutch People's Union	Dutch: Nederlandse Volks-Unie	Extra-parliamentary	

==== Norway ====
Name	Native name(s)	Government	Reference(s)
Alliance	Norwegian: Alliansen	Extra-parliamentary	
Peace and Justice	Norwegian: Fred og Rettferdighet	Extra-parliamentary	

==== North Macedonia ====
Name	Native name(s)	Government	Reference(s)
Democratic Party of Serbs in Macedonia	Serbian: Демократска странка Срба у Македонији, romanized: Demokratska stranka Srba u Makedoniji, Macedonian: Демократска партија на Србите во Македонија, romanized: Demokratska partija na Srbite vo Makedonija	Government	
The Left	Macedonian: Левица, romanized: Levica	Opposition	

==== Poland ====
Name	Native name(s)	Government	Reference(s)
Confederation of the Polish Crown	Polish: Konfederacja Korony Polskiej	Opposition	
Falanga	Polish: Falanga	Extra-parliamentary	
Front	Polish: Front	Extra-parliamentary	
Prosperity and Peace Movement	Polish: Ruch Dobrobytu i Pokoju	Extra-parliamentary	
Slavic Union	Polish: Związek Słowiański	Extra-parliamentary	
Change	Polish: Zmiana	Extra-parliamentary	
Repair Poland Movement	Polish: Ruch Naprawy Polski	Extra-parliamentary	
Voice of Strong Poland	Polish: Głos Silnej Polski	Extra-parliamentary	
Fellow Comrades	Polish: Rodacy Kamraci	Extra-parliamentary	

==== Portugal ====
Name	Native name(s)	Government	Reference(s)
Portuguese Communist Party	Portuguese: Partido Comunista Português	Opposition	

==== Romania ====
Name	Native name(s)	Government	Reference(s)
Alliance for the Union of Romanians	Romanian: Alianța pentru Unirea Românilor	Opposition	
S.O.S. Romania	Romanian: S.O.S. România	Opposition	
Party of Young People	Romanian: Partidul Oamenilor Tineri	Coalition	
The New Right	Romanian: Noua Dreaptă	Extra-parliamentary	
Romanian Nationhood Party	Romanian: Partidul Neamul Romanesc	Extra-parliamentary	
Romanian Socialist Party	Romanian: Partidul Socialist Român	Extra-parliamentary	
United Romania Party	Romanian: Partidul România Unită	Dissolved	

==== Serbia ====
Name	Native name(s)	Government	Reference(s)
Obraz	Serbian: Образ, romanized: Obraz	Extra-parliamentary	
Russian Party	Serbian: Руска странка, romanized: Ruska stranka	Support	
Serbian Action	Serbian: Србска Акција, romanized: Srbska Akcija	Extra-parliamentary	
Serbian Party Oathkeepers	Serbian: Српска странка Заветници, romanized: Srpska stranka Zavetnici	Extra-parliamentary	
Serbian Radical Party	Serbian: Српска радикална странка, romanized: Srpska radikalna stranka	Extra-parliamentary	
Strength of Serbia Movement	Serbian: Покрет Снага Србије, romanized: Pokret Snaga Srbije	Extra-parliamentary	
People's Patrol	Serbian: Народна патрола, romanized: Narodna patrola	Extra-parliamentary	
New Communist Party of Yugoslavia	Serbian: Нова комунистичка партија Југославије, romanized: Nova Komunistička partija Jugoslavije	Extra-parliamentary	
Movement of Socialists	Serbian: Покрет социјалиста, romanized: Pokret socijalista	Support	

==== Slovakia ====
Name	Native name(s)	Government	Reference(s)
Alternative for Slovakia	Slovak: Alternatíva pre Slovensko	Extra-parliamentary	
Direction – Social Democracy	Slovak: Smer – Sociálna Demokracia	Government	
Home – National Party	Slovak: Domov – národná strana	Extra-parliamentary	
People's Party Our Slovakia	Slovak: Ľudová Strana Naše Slovensko	Extra-parliamentary	
Republic	Slovak: Republika	Extra-parliamentary	
Slovak National Party	Slovak: Slovenská Národná Strana	Coalition	
Slovak Patriot	Slovak: Slovenský patriot	Coalition	

==== Slovenia ====
Name	Native name(s)	Government	Reference(s)
Truth	Slovene: Resni.ca	Support	
Trust	Slovene: Zaupanje	Extra-parliamentary	

==== Spain ====
Name	Native name(s)	Government	Reference(s)
National Democracy	Spanish: Democracia Nacional	Extra-parliamentary	
Falange Española de las JONS	Spanish: Falange Española de las Juntas de Ofensiva Nacional Sindicalista	Extra-parliamentary	
Green Left Party	Spanish: Partido de Izquierda Verde	Extra-parliamentary	
Sovereignty and Labor	Spanish: Soberanía y Trabajo	Extra-parliamentary	
The Phalanx	Spanish: La Falange	Dissolved	

==== Sweden ====
Name	Native name(s)	Government	Reference(s)
Alternative for Sweden	Swedish: Alternativ för Sverige	Extra-parliamentary	
Party of the Swedes	Swedish: Svenskarnas parti	Dissolved	

==== Switzerland ====
Name	Native name(s)	Government	Reference(s)
Communist Party	Italian: Partito Comunista	Extra-parliamentary	

==== Turkey ====
Name	Native name(s)	Government	Reference(s)
New Welfare Party	Turkish: Yeniden Refah Partisi	Opposition	
Patriotic Party	Turkish: Vatan Partisi	Extra-parliamentary	
People's Liberation Party	Turkish: Halkın Kurtuluş Partisi	Extra-parliamentary	

==== Ukraine ====
Name	Native name(s)	Reference(s)
Antifascist Committee of Ukraine	Russian: Антифашистский комитет Украины, romanized: Antyfashistskyi Komitet Ukrayny	
Communist Party of Ukraine	Ukrainian: Комуністична партія України, romanized: Komunistychna partiia Ukrainy, Russian: Коммунистическая партия Украины, romanized: Kommunisticheskaya partiya Ukrainy	
Derzhava (Power)	Ukrainian: Держава, romanized: Derzhava	
For United Ukraine!	Ukrainian: За Єдину Україну!, romanized: Za Yedynu Ukrainu!	
Nashi (Ours)	Ukrainian: Наші, romanized: Nashi, Russian: Наши, romanized: Nashi	
Ne Tak (Not Yes)	Ukrainian: Не Так, romanized: Ne Tak	
New Russia Party	Ukrainian: Партия Новороссия, romanized: Partiia Novorossyia, Russian: Партия Новороссия, romanized: Partiya Novorossiya	
Opposition Bloc	Ukrainian: Опозиційний блок, romanized: Opozytsiinyi blok, Russian: Оппозиционный блок, romanized: Oppozitsionnyy blok	
Opposition Platform — For Life	Ukrainian: Опозиційна платформа – За життя, romanized: Opozytsiina Platforma – Za Zhyttia, Russian: Оппозиционная платформа – За жизнь, romanized: Oppozitsionnaya Platforma – Za Zhizn'	
Party of Regions	Ukrainian: Партія регіонів, romanized: Partiia rehioniv, Russian: Партия регионов, romanized: Partiya regionov	
Party of Shariy	Ukrainian: Партія Шарія, romanized: Partiia Shariia, Ukrainian: Партия Шария, romanized: Partiya Shariya	
Peace to Luhanshchyna (Note: Within the Luhansk People's Republic, a pro-Russian breakaway region of Ukraine recognised by Russia as Russian territory and formerly as a country.)	Russian: Мир Луганщине, romanized: Mir Luganshchine, Ukrainian: Спокій Луганщині, romanized: Spokii Luhanshchyni, lit. 'Peace to Luhansk Region'	
Progressive Socialist Party of Ukraine	Ukrainian: Прогресивна соціалістична партія України, romanized: Prohresyvna sotsialistychna partiia Ukrainy, Russian: Прогрессивная социалистическая партия Украины, romanized: Progressivnaya sotsialisticheskaya partiya Ukrainy	
Revival	Ukrainian: Відродження, romanized: Vidrodzhennia	
Russian Unity (Note: Within Crimea, a region of Ukraine that was annexed by Russia in 2014. Some countries recognise Crimea as part of Russia.)	Russian: Русское Единство, romanized: Russkoye Yedinstvo, Ukrainian: Руська Єдність, romanized: Ruska Yednist	
Social Democratic Party of Ukraine (united)	Ukrainian: Соцiал-демократична партія України (об'єднана), romanized: Sotsial-demokratychna partiia Ukrainy (obiednana)	
Social Movement Donetsk Republic (Note: Within the Donetsk People's Republic, a pro-Russian breakaway region of Ukraine recognised by Russia as Russian territory and formerly as a country.)	Russian: Общественное движение Донецкая республика, romanized: Obshchestvennoye dvizheniye Donetskaya respublika	
Soyuz (Union)	Russian: Союз, romanized: Soyuz	
Ukrainian Choice	Ukrainian: Український вибір — право народу, romanized: Ukrainskyi vybir — pravo narodu, Russian: Украинский выбор — право народа, romanized: Ukrainsky vybor — pravo naroda	

==== United Kingdom ====
Name	Native name(s)	Government	Reference(s)
Workers Party of Britain		Extra-parliamentary	
British National Party		Extra-parliamentary	

=== North America ===
==== Honduras ====
Name	Native name(s)	Government	Reference(s)
People's Power Movement	Spanish: Movimiento del Poder Popular	Extra-parliamentary	

==== Mexico ====
Name	Native name(s)	Government	Reference(s)
Union-Nation-Revolution	Spanish: Unión-Nación-Revolución	Extra-parliamentary	

==== Nicaragua ====
Name	Native name(s)	Government	Reference(s)
Sandinista National Liberation Front	Spanish: Frente Sandinista de Liberación Nacional	Government	

==== United States ====
Name	Native name(s)	Government	Reference(s)
American Communist Party		Extra-parliamentary	

=== Oceania ===
==== Australia ====
Name	Native name(s)	Government	Reference(s)
Australian Citizens Party		Extra-parliamentary	
Australia First Party		Extra-parliamentary	

=== South America ===
==== Argentina ====
Name	Native name(s)	Government	Reference(s)
Authentic Socialist Party	Spanish: Partido Socialista Auténtico	Extra-parliamentary	
Communist Party of Argentina	Spanish: Partido Comunista de la Argentina	Extra-parliamentary	
Patria Grande Front	Spanish: Frente Patria Grande	Opposition	

==== Bolivia ====
Name	Native name(s)	Government	Reference(s)
EVO Pueblo	Spanish: Estamos Volviendo Obedeciendo al Pueblo	Extra-parliamentary	

==== Brazil ====
Name	Native name(s)	Government	Reference(s)
New Resistance	Portuguese: Nova Resistência	Extra-parliamentary	
Workers' Cause Party	Portuguese: Partido da Causa Operaria	Extra-parliamentary	

==== Chile ====
Name	Native name(s)	Government	Reference(s)
Workers' Party of Chile	Spanish: Partido de los Trabajadores de Chile	Extra-parliamentary	

==== Paraguay ====
Name	Native name(s)	Government	Reference(s)
Guasú Front	Spanish: Frente Guasú	Opposition	
Tekojoja People's Movement	Spanish: Partido Popular Tekojoja	Opposition	

==== Peru ====
Name	Native name(s)	Government	Reference(s)
Together for Peru	Spanish: Juntos por el Perú	Opposition	

==== Venezuela ====
Name	Native name(s)	Government	Reference(s)
Simón Bolívar Great Patriotic Pole	Spanish: Gran Polo Patriótico Simón Bolívar	Government	

== See also ==
- List of pro-European political parties
- Eurasianism
- Putinism
- Russosphere
- Russophilia
- Russian hybrid warfare
