= 2022 Armenian presidential election =

- 3 March 2022

107 voters: All deputies of the National Assembly 64 votes needed to win
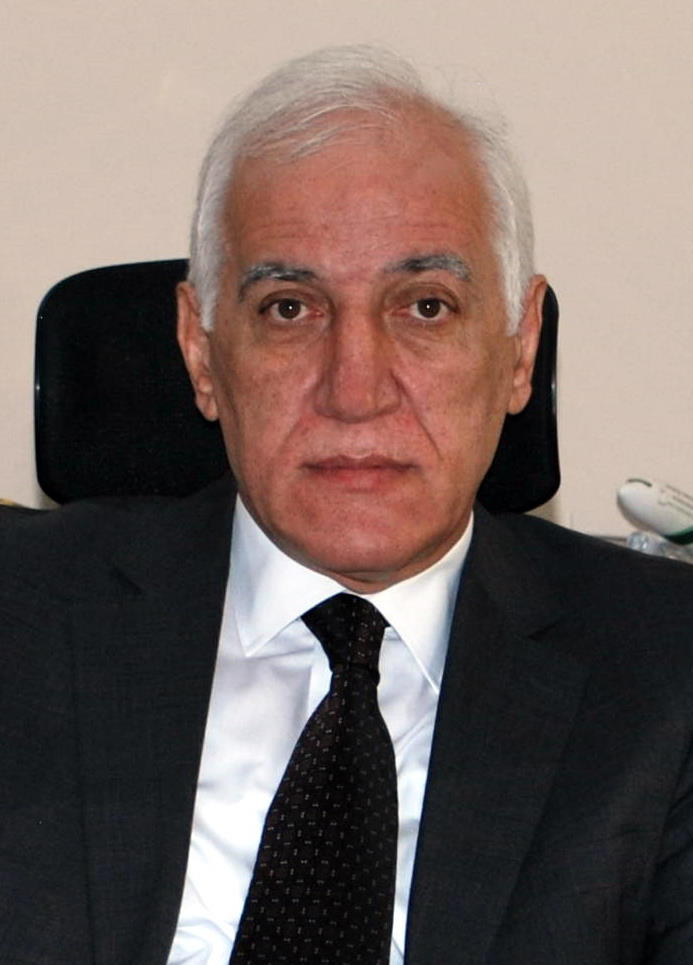
Candidate	Vahagn Khachaturyan
Party	Independent
Electoral vote	71
Nominators	Civil Contract
President before election
Alen Simonyan (acting)
Civil Contract
Elected President
Vahagn Khachaturyan
Independent

Early presidential elections were held in Armenia on 3 March 2022, following President Armen Sarkissian's resignation on 23 January 2022.

== Background ==
In accordance with Article 124 of the amended Constitution, a non-partisan president will be elected for a seven-year, non-renewable term, to which the presidential election should have been originally held in spring 2025. In accordance with Article 125, the candidate that receives at least three fourths of votes of the total number of deputies of the National Assembly will be elected President of Armenia. If the president is not elected, a second round is held wherein all candidates who took part in the first round may participate. In the second round, the candidate that receives at least three fifths of votes of the total number of deputies will be elected as President of the Republic. If a president is still not elected, a third round of elections will be held wherein the two candidates who received a greater number of votes in the second round may participate. In the third round, the candidate who receives the majority of votes of the total number of deputies will be elected.

According to Article 125 of the constitution, at least one fourth of the total number of deputies of the National Assembly shall have the right to nominate a candidate for president. This means that at least 27 members of parliament must back the respective candidate in order for that candidate to be officially nominated. Thus, in the case of a wide consensus, a candidate may very well run unopposed since minority parties with less than 27 members in the National Assembly will not be able to nominate a candidate.

== Eligibility ==
According to the amended constitution, everyone who has reached the age of forty, held citizenship of only Armenia for the preceding six years and permanently resided in Armenia for the preceding six years, has the right of suffrage, and speaks the Armenian language may be elected as President of the Republic.

== Candidates ==
The ruling Civil Contract party (71 seats) and the primary opposition Armenia Alliance (29 seats) met the 27 seat requirement to nominate a presidential candidate. However, the junior opposition I Have Honor Alliance only has 6 seats and could not nominate a candidate by itself.

Name	Party	Nominators	Notes	Offices held
Vahagn Khachaturyan	Independent	Civil Contract		Mayor of Yerevan (1992–1996), Minister of High-Tech Industry (2021–2022)

=== Opposition boycott ===
The Armenia Alliance and I Have Honor Alliance of the National Assembly announced they had decided “not to participate in the presidential election in any way.” The two opposition alliances said in a joint statement, “The Constitution of Armenia demands that the President of the Republic be impartial, guided by national interests. Although the institution of the President should act as a truly neutral institution uniting the society, the government in power has decided to nominate and elect a President representing the ruling force only.” Noting that Armenia is facing serious internal and external challenges, the opposition MPs emphasized that “there is no alternative to national unity and public solidarity.”

== Results ==
Candidate	Party	First round		Second round	
Candidate	Party	Votes	%	Votes	%
Vahagn Khachaturyan	Independent	69	100.00	71	100.00
Against		0	0.00	0	0.00
Total		69	100.00	71	100.00
Valid votes		69	100.00	71	100.00
Invalid/blank votes		0	0.00	0	0.00
Total votes		69	100.00	71	100.00
Registered voters/turnout		107	64.49	107	66.36
Source: News.am, RadioFreeEurope

== See also ==
- Constitution of Armenia
- Elections in Armenia
- Government of Armenia
- Politics of Armenia
