= Anna Grigoryan =

Armenian politician (born 1991)

Anna Arami Grigoryan (born 8 January 1991, Kapan) is an Armenian politician and a member of the Armenian Parliament.

She studied Translation Studies at the Yerevan State University earning a BSc in 2011 and a MSc in 2013. In 2017 she also attended the Diplomatic school of the Armenian Ministry of Foreign Affairs.

Grigoryan is a member of the Union of Young Translators since 2012 and a teacher at the Quantum College since 2013. In 2020 she worked in the Ministry of Environment becoming a deputy head of the department on International Cooperation.

In the Armenian parliamentary elections of December 2020 Grigoryan was elected as a member of the Armenian Parliament representing the My Step alliance. But the same month she left the My Step alliance, while keeping her seat in parliament. As an independent MP she opposed the Government of Nikol Pashinyan and demanded a stronger support for the people in Artsakh against Turkey and Azerbaijan.

In May 2021 she joined the Reviving Armenia party which she deemed to better represent the Syunik Province after the war in Nagorno Karabakh than the current Armenian Government. She voiced a strong support for the self determination of the people in Artsakh. She took part in the parliamentary elections of 2021 nominated on a ticket of the Armenia Alliance led by Robert Kocharyan. In January 2022, she questioned the abilities of the human rights delegate of Armenia Kristine Grigoryan and deemed her of rather being a defender of the Civil Contract party.

She is a participant in the 2022 Armenian protests.
