= Rise Party =

Armenian political party

Rise Party Վերելք Կուսակցություն
- Leader: Aleksan Minasyan
- Founded: 2021
- Headquarters: Yerevan, Armenia
- Ideology: Armenian nationalism
- Slogan: “Mind, Unity, Strength”

Website
- verelq.com

The Rise Party (Armenian: Վերելք Կուսակցություն, romanized: Verelk’ Kusakts’ut’yun), also known as the Ascent Party, is an Armenian political party. It was founded on 2 March 2021 and is currently led by Aleksan Minasyan.

== History ==
The party was established during the 2020–2021 Armenian protests by Aleksan Minasyan, the founder and former Director of the Monte Melkonian Military College. The party confirmed its intention to participate in the 2021 Armenian parliamentary elections. Following the election, the party received just 0.10% of the popular vote, failing to win any seats. The party currently does not have any political representation in the National Assembly and acts as an extra-parliamentary force.

== Ideology ==
The party calls for national unity, investing in education, developing the economy, and strengthening the military of Armenia.

== Electoral record ==
=== Parliamentary elections ===
| Election | Leader | Votes | % | Seats | +/– | Position | Government |
|---|---|---|---|---|---|---|---|
| 2021 | Aleksan Minasyan | 1,233 | 0.10 | 0 / 107 | 0 | ▲22nd | Extra-parliamentary |

== See also ==
- Programs of political parties in Armenia
