= National Security Party =

National Security Party Ազգային անվտանգություն կուսակցություն
- Leader: Garnik Isagulyan
- Headquarters: Yerevan, Armenia

Party flag

The National Security Party (Armenian: Ազգային անվտանգություն կուսակցություն, romanized: Azgayin anvtangut’yun kusakts’ut’yun) is an Armenian political party.

== History ==
The party is led by Garnik Isagulyan and does not have any representation in the National Assembly. The party currently acts as an extra-parliamentary force.

Prior to the 2013 Yerevan City Council election, the party announced it would not participate or endorse any other party. Prior to the 2013 Armenian presidential election, the party said that it would support the presidential winner by taking an active part in building a safe, just and secure Armenia.

Following the 2020–2021 Armenian protests, Garnik Isagulyan accused President Armen Sarksyan of supporting Edmon Marukyan leader of Bright Armenia to become the next prime minister.

== Activities ==
Prior to the 2014 Scottish independence referendum, the party sent a letter to the Scottish National Party wishing them success towards achieving self-determination for Scotland in the upcoming independence referendum.

Following the 2016 Yerevan hostage crisis, Garnik Isagulyan declared the Sasna Tsrer Pan-Armenian Party a criminal party.

On 9 November 2020, the party signed a joint declaration with the other member parties of the Homeland Salvation Movement calling on Prime Minister Nikol Pashinyan to resign during the 2020–2021 Armenian protests.

On 23 December 2020, Garnik Isagulyan was arrested for inciting mob violence against Prime Minister Nikol Pashinyan.

== See also ==
- Programs of political parties in Armenia
