= National Christian Party (Armenia) =

National Christian Party Ազգային քրիստոնեական կուսակցություն
- Leader: Ara Zohrabyan
- Founded: 2021
- Headquarters: Yerevan, Armenia
- Ideology: Christian democracy; Conservatism
- Slogan: "Wake up, wake up."

Website
- zartonq.am

The National Christian Party (Armenian: Ազգային քրիստոնեական կուսակցություն, romanized: Azgayin k’ristoneakan kusakts’ut’yun), also known as the Awakening National Christian Party, is a conservative political party in Armenia.

== History ==
The party was founded on 29 April 2021 during the 2020–2021 Armenian protests, and is led by Ara Zohrabyan. The party confirmed it would participate in the 2021 Armenian parliamentary elections. Following the election, the party won just 0.36% of the popular vote.

The party does not maintain any representation within the National Assembly and currently acts as an extra-parliamentary force.

In November 2021, the party participated in local elections in the city of Gyumri, winning 4 seats on the Gyumri city council.

== Ideology ==
The party seeks to develop a strong nation-state, strengthen the military, develop the economy, and protect the rights of citizens, while basing its core beliefs on Christian values and protecting the role of the Armenian Apostolic Church in society. The party also supports the self-determination of Artsakh.

== Electoral record ==
=== Parliamentary elections ===
Election	Leader	Votes	%	Seats	+/–	Position	Government
2021	Ara Zohrabyan	4,619	0.36	0 / 107	0	▲15th	Extra-parliamentary

== See also ==
- Programs of political parties in Armenia
