= For Social Justice (Armenia) =

Armenian political party

For Social Justice (Armenia) Հանուն սոցիալական արդարության
- Abbreviation: HASAK
- Leader: Arman Ghukasyan
- Founded: 2016
- Headquarters: Yerevan, Armenia
- Ideology: Social conservatism Russophilia; Soft Euroscepticism
- Political position: Centre-right

Website
- https://hasak.am/

For Social Justice (Armenian: Հանուն սոցիալական արդարության), also known as For the Sake of Social Justice, is an Armenian political party.

== History ==
The party was founded in 2016. On 10 November 2018, a new board of the party was elected and Arman Ghukasyan was re-elected as the party chairman, during a party congress.

In September 2020, the party signed a declaration pledging to support the Armenian Armed Forces along with members of the Homeland Salvation Movement political alliance. During the 2021 Armenian political crisis, the party further called on Armenian Prime Minister Nikol Pashinyan to step down. Arman Ghukasyan stated that, "The role of the Russian Federation in the security of Armenia is indisputable and we must immediately take steps to deepen Armenian–Russian relations in all directions."

== Electoral record ==
The party initially announced its intentions to run in the 2018 Armenian parliamentary elections, but ultimately did not participate. Currently, the party acts as an extra-parliamentary force, although the party has announced they will participate in future elections.

The party participated in the 2023 Yerevan City Council elections, nominating Arman Ghukasyan as candidate for Mayor of Yerevan. Following the elections, the party failed to win any seats in the Yerevan City Council, winning just 0.34% of the vote.

== Ideology ==
Alternative logo of the party.

The party advocates for increasing social security benefits, improving education and health care, reducing the gap between rich and poor, combating social injustice, and building a strong parliamentary republic. The party also favors the protection of public values and the implementation of a foreign policy aimed at Armenia's national interests.

The party believes in maintaining strong relations with Russia and considers Russia a strategic ally of Armenia. The party also supports the development of economic ties with the United States and the European Union, but not to the detriment of the traditional values of Armenian society. The party is in favor of Armenia's continued membership in the Eurasian Economic Union and the CIS.

== Activities ==
Following the 2020 Nagorno-Karabakh war, the party held several conferences with displaced residents from Artsakh. Arman Ghukasyan stated that the people of Artsakh must be supported by the Armenian government. Ghukasyan criticized Prime Minister Nikol Pashinyan, and proclaimed that the Russian government has done more to help Artsakh then the Government of Armenia.

== See also ==
- Programs of political parties in Armenia
