= Sovereign Armenia Party =

Sovereign Armenia Party Ինքնիշխան Հայաստան կուսակցություն
- Leader: Davit Sanasaryan
- Founded: 9 April 2021
- Headquarters: Yerevan
- Ideology: Pro-Western; Pro-Europeanism
- Political position: Centre
- National Assembly: 0 / 107

Party flag

Website
- ihk.am

The Sovereign Armenia Party (Armenian: Ինքնիշխան Հայաստան կուսակցություն, romanized: Ink’nishkhan Hayastan kusakts’ut’yun), also known as the Independent Armenia Party, is an Armenian political party.

== History ==
The party was established in April 2021 and currently acts as an extra-parliamentary force. Its co-founder and leader is Davit Sanasaryan. Davit Sanasaryan was the former head of Armenia's state anti-corruption agency, however, Sanasaryan resigned from his position as a result of a criminal case against him for corruption allegations. He was also a former member of Prime Minister Nikol Pashinyan's, Civil Contract party, and the Heritage party before that.

The party is skeptical of the Homeland Salvation Movement political alliance. During an interview, Davit Sanasaryan stated that most of the leaders of that alliance should be imprisoned for corruption.

The party announced its intentions to participate in the 2021 Armenian parliamentary elections. Following the election, the party won just 0.31% of the popular vote, failing to win any representation in the National Assembly.

== Ideology ==
The party opposes Prime Minister Nikol Pashinyan's policies and believes that Turkey must be held accountable for its role in the 2020 Nagorno-Karabakh war. The party suggests launching an investigation on the war and the role of the current authorities in Armenia's defeat. The party also supports free elections, combating criminal regimes, developing a strong market economy, increasing the population, strengthening the military, and supporting Artsakh's independence and security.

In addition, the party believes that it was a mistake for the Government of Armenia to reject the signing of an Association Agreement with the EU in 2013. The party believes that it was unwise of Armenia to become solely dependent on Russia for its security. Davit Sanasaryan has stated that the government should have used the momentum of the 2018 Armenian revolution to make a shift in Armenia's foreign policy. The party believes that Armenia should establish mutually beneficial relations with both Russia and the United States, as well as, building effective partnerships with other countries.

In April 2023, Sanasaryan stated that France should replace Russia as Armenia's strategic ally.

== Activities ==
On 1 April 2021, the Sovereign Armenia Party signed a joint declaration with 4 other political parties calling on the Government of Armenia to ensure free and fair upcoming elections, following the on-going political unrest in Armenia.

On 14 April 2021, Davit Sanasaryan met with the President of Armenia Armen Sargsyan to discuss the ongoing political situation in the country.

On 7 May 2021, party members met with representatives of the Generation of Independence Party, political issues and potential cooperation was discussed.

On 3 August 2021, the Sovereign Armenia Party, the European Party of Armenia and the Conservative Party released a joint statement calling for the Armenian government to demand the CSTO military alliance to cease selling weapons to Azerbaijan and Turkey. The statement also called for the withdrawal of Armenia from the CSTO, should the alliance ignore Armenia's security concerns.

== Electoral record ==
=== Parliamentary elections ===
Election	Leader	Votes	%	Seats	+/–	Position	Government
2021	Davit Sanasaryan	3,915	0.31	0 / 107	0	▲19th	Extra-parliamentary

== See also ==
- Programs of political parties in Armenia
