= All-Armenian National Statehood Party =

Armenian political party

All-Armenian National Statehood Party Համահայկական ազգային պետականություն կուսակցություն
- Leader: Artur Vardanyan
- Founded: 2021
- Headquarters: Yerevan
- Ideology: Armenian nationalism
- National Assembly: 0 / 107

The All-Armenian National Statehood Party, also known as the Pan-Armenian National Statehood Party (Armenian: Համահայկական ազգային պետականություն կուսակցություն, romanized: Hamahaykakan azgayin petakanut’yun kusakts’ut’yun) is an Armenian political party. It was founded on 13 May 2021 and is currently led by Artur Vardanyan.

== History ==
The All-Armenian National Statehood Party was founded in May 2021 and Arthur Vardanyan was unanimously elected chairman of the party. The party subsequently announced its intentions to participate in the 2021 Armenian parliamentary election. The party opposed forming any alliances with other political parties. Following the election, the party won 0.06% of the popular vote, failing to win any seats in the National Assembly. Currently, the party acts as an extra-parliamentary force.

== Ideology ==
The party supports the continued economic development of the country, increasing security and protecting the territorial integrity of Armenia. In terms of foreign policy, the party has stated that it is not explicitly Pro-Russian or Pro-European, but rather focuses on being "Pro-Armenian".

== Electoral record ==
=== Parliamentary elections ===
Election	Leader	Votes	%	Seats	+/–	Position	Government
2021	Artur Vardanyan	803	0.06%	0 / 107	0	▲24th	Extra-parliamentary

== See also ==
- Programs of political parties in Armenia
