= United Homeland Party =

United Homeland Party Միացյալ հայրենիք կուսակցություն
- Leader: Mher Terteryan
- Founded: 23 April 2021
- Headquarters: Yerevan
- Ideology: Armenian nationalism; Russophilia
- Slogan: "Let's Select the Future"

The United Homeland Party (Armenian: Միացյալ հայրենիք կուսակցություն, romanized: Miats’yal hayrenik’ kusakts’ut’yun) is an Armenian political party. It was founded on 23 April 2021 and is currently led by economist Mher Terteryan.

== History ==
The party was founded during the 2020–2021 Armenian protests and does not maintain any political representation within the National Assembly. The party currently acts as an extra-parliamentary force.

The party confirmed its intentions to participate in the 2021 Armenian parliamentary elections and also stated that they opposed forming any political alliances. The candidate list was led by Lusine Avagyan. Following the election, the party won just 0.08% of the popular vote, failing to win any seats.

== Ideology ==
The party supports strengthening the military of Armenia, protecting the environment, improving healthcare, and maintaining strong cooperation with Russia.

== Electoral record ==
=== Parliamentary elections ===
Election	Leader	Votes	%	Seats	+/–	Position	Government
2021	Mher Terteryan	964	0.08	0 / 107	0	▲23rd	Extra-parliamentary

== See also ==
- Programs of political parties in Armenia
