= Pan-Armenian Congress =

Organization

Pan-Armenian Congress logo

The Pan-Armenian Congress (Armenian: Համահայկական կոնգրես) is a charitable non-governmental organization.

== History ==
The Pan-Armenian Congress was founded on 11 August 2014 as an NGO and has since reached an international status. The organization's headquarters are located in Yerevan.

== Objectives ==
The main objectives of the Pan-Armenian Congress is to be a mechanism for raising issues of pan-Armenian significance and solving them through cooperation. The scope of activities of the Pan-Armenian Congress includes Armenia, Artsakh and the Armenian Diaspora.

Meanwhile, the primary goals of the Congress is to preserve Armenian identity, encourage recognition of the Armenian genocide, utilize the influence and potential of Armenian communities in different countries to increase Armenia's international involvement, tackling corruption in Armenia and supporting business entrepreneurship, economic development, and social justice.

Following the 2020 Nagorno-Karabakh war, the Congress proposed creating a demilitarized zone around the Republic of Artsakh, while also calling for international recognition of Artsakh.

Prior to the 2021 Armenian parliamentary election, the Congress opposed any former president to reassume power in Armenia. The Congress opposed both Robert Kocharyan or Serzh Sargsyan of becoming prime minister. The Congress also called for greater pluralism in the National Assembly, and to lower the electoral threshold from the current 5% to 1%, in order to allow more diverse representation of political parties.

== Leadership ==
The current president of the Pan-Armenian Congress is Armen Badalyan.

== See also ==
- Armenians
