= Homeland of Armenians Party =

Homeland of Armenians Party Հայերի հայրենիք կուսակցություն
- Leader: Artak Galstyan
- Founded: 2005 2018
- Dissolved: 2016
- Headquarters: Yerevan
- Ideology: Armenian nationalism Russophilia

Website
- hayochayreniq.com

The Homeland of Armenians Party (Armenian: Հայերի հայրենիք կուսակցություն, romanized: Hayeri hayrenik’ kusakts’ut’yun) is an Armenian political party. It was originally registered in 2005 but de-registered in 2016. The party was officially re-established in 2018 following the 2018 Armenian revolution and is currently led by Artak Galstyan.

== History ==
The Homeland of Armenians Party was established in 2018 and Artak Galstyan was elected chairman of the party. The party announced its intentions to participate in the 2021 Armenian parliamentary election. Following the election, the party won 1.03% of the popular vote, failing to win any seats in the National Assembly. The party released a statement claiming that there were several violations during the elections and that they were rigged. Currently, the party acts as an extra-parliamentary force.

== Ideology ==
The party supports the strengthening of the Armenian military, protecting the territorial integrity of Armenia and Artsakh, and criminalizing hate speech. The party maintains Pro-Russian views and supports Russian troops guarding the Armenian border.

== Electoral record ==
=== Parliamentary elections ===
Election	Leader	Votes	%	Seats	+/–	Position	Government
2021	Artak Galstyan	13,130	1.03%	0 / 107	0	▲12th	Extra-parliamentary

== See also ==
- Programs of political parties in Armenia
