= One Armenia Party =

Armenian political party

One Armenia Party Մեկ Հայաստան կուսակցություն
- Chairman: Arthur Ghazinyan
- Founded: February 2019
- Headquarters: Yerevan
- Ideology: Progressivism
- Political position: Centre
- National affiliation: Homeland Salvation Movement (2020-2021); Armenia Alliance (2021-2022)
- National Assembly: 0 / 107

Website
- 1armenia.am

One Armenia Party (Armenian: Մեկ Հայաստան կուսակցություն, romanized: Mek Hayastan kusakts’ut’yun) is a centrist political party in Armenia. It was founded on 19 February 2019 by Arthur Ghazinian.

== History ==
The founding congress of the One Armenia Party was held on 19 February 2019, in Yerevan. Arthur Ghazinian, who also heads Yerevan State University's Center of European Studies, was elected by a majority of party members as chairman.

The party released its charter and manifesto as well as completed its registration with the Ministry of Justice. At a briefing with reporters, Artur Ghazinyan stated that this new party is a centrist political force and will help avoid a possible collision of opposite political poles in Armenia.

The party has been a critic of Armenia's Prime Minister Nikol Pashinyan, with Ghazinian stating that the Prime Minister has already lost his legitimacy, has fully exhausted himself and will soon lose power. The party has also criticized Pashinyan's government of poorly handling foreign affairs and the on-going Nagorno-Karabakh conflict.

The party confirmed that it would nominate a single candidate to participate in the 2021 Armenian parliamentary election as part of the Armenia Alliance. Following the election, the Armenia Alliance gained 21% of the popular vote and won 29 seats in the National Assembly, with the One Armenia Party winning one of those seats.

On 4 July 2022, Arthur Ghazinian announced that he was renouncing his seat, leaving the party without any representation in the National Assembly. The party currently acts as an extra-parliamentary force.

== Ideology ==
The party believes in developing Armenia's civil society, strengthening democracy and creating a powerful sovereign state with a strong national identity and institutions. The party has also voiced strong opposition to ideological polarization, populism, radicalism and extremism. Instead, the party encourages ideological restraint and establishing a collaborative and consensual political culture in Armenia.

In terms of foreign policy, the party supports a balanced relationship with both Russia and the European Union. The party also supports international recognition of Artsakh as well as protecting Armenia's cultural heritage and the values of the Armenian Apostolic Church.

== Activities ==
In June 2019, party members met with the President of Armenia, Armen Sarkissian. Party leader Ghazinian presented the ideology of the political party and directions of its activities.

On 9 November 2020, the party signed a joint declaration with the other member parties of the Homeland Salvation Movement calling on Prime Minister Nikol Pashinyan to resign during the 2020–2021 Armenian protests.

== Electoral record ==
=== Parliamentary elections ===
Election	Leader	Votes	%	Seats	+/–	Position	Government
2021 (Note: Run within Armenia Alliance)	Arthur Ghazinyan	269,481	21.11	1 / 107	▲1	▲2nd	Opposition

== See also ==
- Politics of Armenia
- Programs of political parties in Armenia
