= 5165 National Conservative Movement Party =

5165 National Conservative Movement Party 5165 Ազգային պահպանողական շարժում կուսակցություն
- Leader: Karin Tonoyan
- Founded: 2021
- Headquarters: Yerevan
- Ideology: Armenian nationalism
- Slogan: "For the sake of Armenians and Armenia"
- National Assembly: 0 / 107

Website
- Facebook page

The 5165 National Conservative Movement Party (Armenian: 5165 Ազգային պահպանողական շարժում կուսակցություն, romanized: 5165 Azgayin pahpanoghakan sharzhum kusakts’ut’yun) is an Armenian political party. It was founded on 22 April 2021 and is currently led by Karin Tonoyan.

== History ==
The 5165 National Conservative Movement Party was founded in April 2021 and Karin Tonoyan was elected chairwoman of the party. The number within the name of the party represents the height of Mount Ararat. The party announced its intentions to participate in the 2021 Armenian parliamentary election. Following the election, the party won 1.22% of the popular vote, failing to win any seats in the National Assembly. Currently, the party acts as an extra-parliamentary force.

== Ideology ==
The party supports increasing the security of the country, developing a stronger military, healthcare reform, strengthening the economy, encouraging the repatriation of the Armenian Diaspora, and supporting independence for Artsakh.

== Electoral record ==
=== Parliamentary elections ===
Election	Leader	Votes	%	Seats	+/–	Position	Government
2021	Karin Tonoyan	15,549	1.22%	0 / 107	0	▲10th	Extra-parliamentary

== See also ==
- Programs of political parties in Armenia
