= Armenian Eagles Unified Armenia Party =

Armenian Eagles Unified Armenia Party Հայ Արծիվներ Միասնական Հայաստան կուսակցություն
- Leader: Khachik Asryan
- Founded: 23 June 2018
- Headquarters: Yerevan
- Ideology: Armenian nationalism Russophilia; Anti-Western sentiment Euroscepticism
- Political position: Right-wing
- Slogan: "God, Armenian Nation, Armenia!"

Website
- hayocartsivner.am

The Armenian Eagles Unified Armenia Party (Armenian: Հայ Արծիվներ Միասնական Հայաստան կուսակցություն, romanized: Hay Artsivner Miasnakan Hayastan kusakts’ut’yun) is an Armenian political party. It was founded on 23 June 2018 and is currently led by Khachik Asryan.

== History ==
The Armenian Eagles Unified Armenia Party was founded in June 2018 and Khachik Asryan was elected chairman of the party. The party announced its intentions to participate in the 2021 Armenian parliamentary election. However, on 7 June 2021, the party confirmed that it is withdrawing its participation in the elections and would boycott the elections until the security and territorial integrity of Armenia is restored. Currently, the party does not have any representation in the National Assembly and acts as an extra-parliamentary force.

== Ideology ==
The party supports the activities of the Armenian Apostolic Church, creating a United Armenia, and aligning closer with Russia. Chairman Khachik Asryan stated, "We must move forward, strengthen Armenia and Russia as loyal, faithful Christian brothers and allied-friendly states. Ensuring peace in the Armenian plateau given to us by Armenians depends exclusively on the honest, irreplaceable friendship between Armenia and Russia."

== See also ==
- Programs of political parties in Armenia
