= Nigavan =

Nigavan Նիգավան
- Location within Armenia Location within Aragatsotn
- Coordinates: 40°37′18″N 44°17′57″E
- Country: Armenia
- Province: Aragatsotn
- Municipality: Aparan

Population (2011)
  - Total: 658
- Time zone: UTC+4
  - Summer (DST): UTC+5

Nigavan (Armenian: Նիգավան) is a village in the Aparan Municipality of the Aragatsotn Province of Armenia. The town has a cyclopean fort.
