= Meruzhan Ter-Gulanyan =

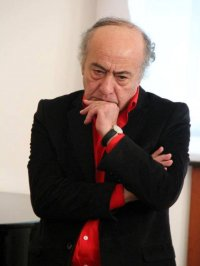
- Born: November 29, 1948; Goman, Javakheti
- Education: Yerevan State University
- Occupations: Writer, publicist
- Writing career
- Notable awards: Order of Lenin; Movses Khorenatsi

Meruzhan Sargsi Ter-Gulanyan (Armenian: Մերուժան Սարգսի Տեր-Գուլանյան; November 29, 1948, Goman, Javakheti) is an Armenian writer and publicist. He is a member of the Mass Media Council of the Republic of Armenia.

== Biography ==
Meruzhan Ter-Gulanyan was born on November 29, 1948, in Goman, Javakheti. In 1968, he enrolled as a student in the Faculty of Journalism at Yerevan State University.

In 1973, he began working at "Garun" magazine as a literary worker. He subsequently served as head of department and deputy chief editor, and from 1986 to 1990, he was the magazine's chief editor. From 1988 to 1993, he was the founding director of the Javakhe Patriotic Union.

In 1978, several of his stories were translated into 21 languages and published in the magazine «Дружба народов», edited by Hrant Matevosyan. He is the author of over 1,000 essays, notes, and journalistic articles published in the press of Armenia and other countries.

In 1990, he served as a deputy of the Supreme Council of the Armenian Soviet Socialist Republic. He also held the position of president of the RA Standing Committee on Media Affairs and was a member of the Presidium of the Supreme Council. From 1995 to 1999, he was a member of Parliament, participating in the science, education, culture, and youth affairs commission. During these years, he authored and presented laws on press, radio, television, copyright, and the national archive fund.

In 1997, he founded the first independent “AR” TV and became its founding president. Prior to this, he established the independent weeklies “Ar,” “Hanrapetutyun,” and “Aspnjak.” From 2006 to 2009, he served as the chief editor of “De Facto” magazine. Between 2008 and 2011, he was the director of “Ararat” TV. On March 19, 2011, following a Presidential decree, he was appointed a member of the Armenian Public Radio Television Council. In 2012, he founded the “Andin” literary and social-political magazine, where he continues to serve as chief editor.

== Awards and prizes ==
In 1980, he was awarded the WUA Prize, named after Michael Nalbandyan, for his essay "Araratyan Yerkir." In 1993, he received an honorary doctorate from Louisiana State University for his work in protecting human rights and freedom of speech. In 1999, he was awarded the Fridtjof Nansen Gold Medal. In 2011, he received the "Elite of the World" Order from the International Humanitarian Fund and was also awarded the Movses Khorenatsi Medal. In 2014, he was declared an honorable citizen of Javakhe and Yerevan.
