= Fair Armenia Party =

Armenian political party

Fair Armenia Party Արդար Հայաստան կուսակցություն
- Leader: Norayr Norikyan
- Founded: 20 January 2021
- Headquarters: Yerevan, Armenia
- Ideology: Economic liberalism; Pro-Europeanism; Russophilia; Catch-all party
- Political position: Centre
- Colours: Orange
- Slogan: "Stand up, Armenia!"
- National Assembly: 0 / 107

Website
- Facebook page

The Fair Armenia Party (Armenian: Արդար Հայաստան կուսակցություն, romanized: Ardar Hayastan kusakts’ut’yun) is an Armenian political party.

== History ==
The Fair Armenia Party was established on 20 January 2021, during a party congress held in Yerevan. Norayr Norikyan is the founder and chairman of the party. The party confirmed its intentions to participate in the 2021 Armenian parliamentary elections. Following the election, the party won just 0.31% of the popular vote and failed to gain any representation in the National Assembly. The party announced that it recognized the results of the elections and that it would seek to cooperate with other political groups. The party currently acts as an extra-parliamentary force.

The party participated in the 2023 Yerevan City Council election, nominating Norayr Norikyan as their candidate for Mayor of Yerevan. Following the election, the party failed to gain any seats in the Yerevan City Council, gaining just 1.12% of the vote.

== Ideology ==
The party believes in creating a strong and influential state, improving socio-economic development, eliminating political corruption and all forms of discrimination, strengthening the rule of law and social justice, protecting the environment, encouraging immigration from the Armenian Diaspora and fighting for international recognition of the Armenian genocide.

In regards to foreign affairs, the party favors both the European integration of Armenia, while also affirming that Armenia should remain a member of the Eurasian Economic Union and further integrate within it. The party believes that Armenia belongs to the "European family" of states and should fully implement the Armenia-EU Comprehensive and Enhanced Partnership Agreement with the EU, while at the same time, also maintain strong economic ties with Russia.

The party also believes in the right to self-determination for Artsakh, maintaining Armenia's membership in the CSTO, and normalizing relations with Turkey and Azerbaijan following a peaceful settlement to the Nagorno-Karabakh conflict. The party is strongly critical of the 2020 Nagorno-Karabakh ceasefire agreement.

In addition, the party seeks to develop closer relations with the United States and NATO, India, China, Georgia, Iran, among others.

== Activities ==
On 22 March 2021, Fair Armenia representatives met with the president of Armenia, Armen Sargsyan to discuss the political situation in the country.

On 1 April 2021, the Fair Armenia Party signed a joint declaration with 4 other political parties calling on the Government of Armenia to ensure free and fair upcoming elections, following the on-going political unrest in Armenia.

== Electoral record ==
=== Parliamentary elections ===
| Election | Leader | Votes | % | Seats | +/– | Position | Government |
|---|---|---|---|---|---|---|---|
| 2021 | Norayr Norikyan | 3,914 | 0.31 | 0 / 107 | 0 | ▲17th | Extra-parliamentary |

== See also ==
- Programs of political parties in Armenia
