= United Labour Party (Armenia) =

United Labour Party Միավորված աշխատանքային կուսակցություն
- Abbreviation: ULP
- Leader: Gurgen Arsenyan
- Founded: 2002
- Headquarters: Yerevan
- Membership: 17,000
- Ideology: Social democracy; Pro-Europeanism
- Political position: Centre-left
- National Assembly: 1 / 107

Website
- ulp.am

The United Labour Party (ULP) (Armenian: Միավորված աշխատանքային կուսակցություն, romanized: Miavorvats Ashkhatankayin Kusaksutyun) is a social-democratic political party in Armenia. It is led by Gurgen Arsenyan.

== History ==
Following the Armenian parliamentary election on 25 May 2003, the party won 5.7% of the popular vote and 6 out of 131 seats in the National Assembly. In the 2007 Armenian parliamentary elections, the party failed to win any seats, with a popular vote of 4.39%.

The party officially endorsed Prosperous Armenia prior to the 2012 Armenian parliamentary election. Both parties held a joint conference prior to the election where Gurgen Arsenyan pledged his support. Arsenyan participated as a candidate under Prosperous Armenia's electoral list. Following the announcement, Prosperous Armenia leader Gagik Tsarukyan expressed his gratitude for trust and support of the United Labour Party.

In 2015, party leaders met with the then President of Armenia, Serzh Sargsyan to discuss constitutional reforms.

Party leader Gurgen Arsenyan endorsed the 2018 Armenian revolution and stated that, "the United Labor Party will unconditionally support the citizens of Armenia in exercising their right to form a new National Assembly."

In January 2021, Arsenyan met with Prime Minister Nikol Pashinyan to discuss various political issues.

On 1 April 2021, the United Labour Party signed a joint declaration with four other political parties calling on the Government of Armenia to ensure free and fair upcoming elections, following the on-going political unrest in Armenia.

The party confirmed that it would participate in the 2021 Armenian parliamentary elections with Nikol Pashinyan's Civil Contract party. Gurgen Arsenyan was listed on Civil Contracts electoral list. Following the election, Civil Contract won 53.9% of the popular vote and 71 seats in the National Assembly. Arsenyan won a single seat.

== Ideology ==
The party advocates for the growth of a free-market economy, social development, protection of human rights, and the self-determination of nations. The party believes Armenia should deepen its European integration and raise its political and economic relations with the European Union, while also maintaining strong ties with Russia.

== See also ==
- Programs of political parties in Armenia
- Politics of Armenia
