= Karen Matevosyan =

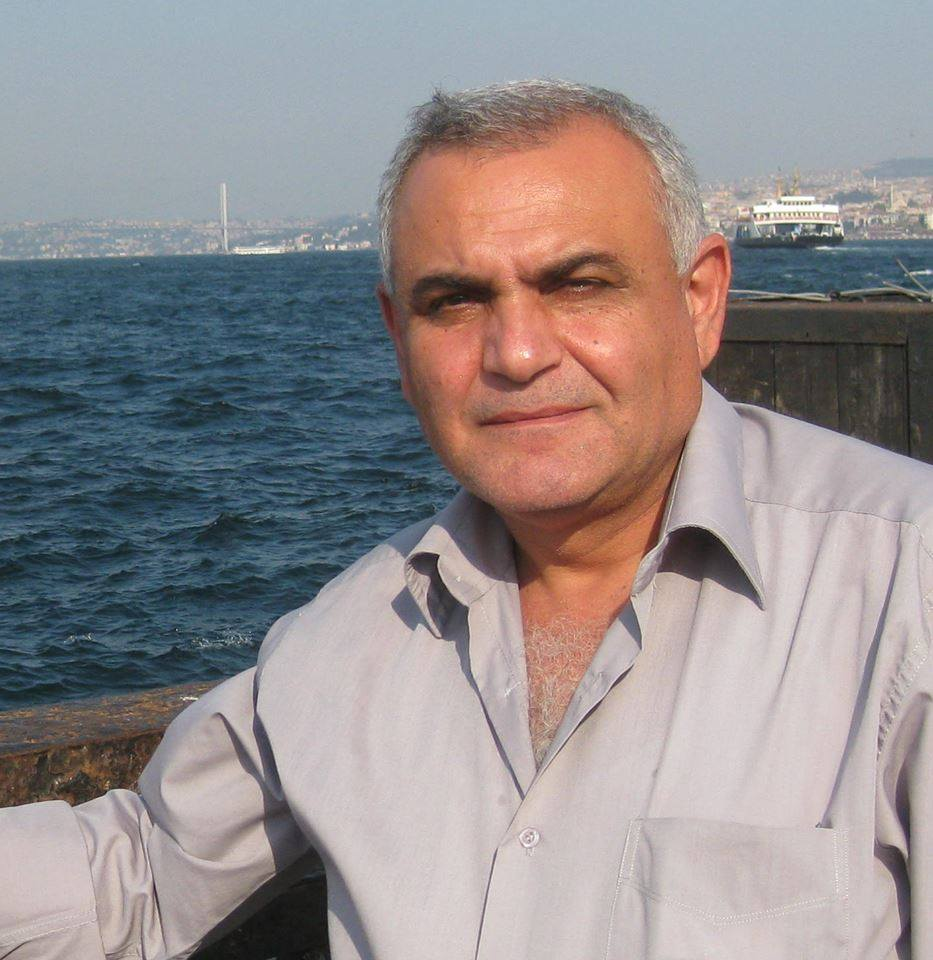
Karen Matevosyan, Armenian art historian

Karen Matevosyan (Armenian: Կարեն Մաթևոսյան) is an Armenian art historian. He currently heads the art history department at the Matenadaran in Yerevan.

Matevosyan has authored and co-authored 25 books and nearly 115 scientific articles on the history, architecture, and art of medieval Armenia, with a significant focus on the medieval capital of Ani, of which he is considered a specialist. He has previously worked at the National Gallery of Armenia and has taught at the Gevorgian Seminary of the Armenian Church and the Armenian State Pedagogical University.
