= Iveta Tonoyan =

Armenian politician and journalist

Iveta Sasuni Tonoyan (Armenian: Իվետա Սասունի Տոնոյան; born 22 November 1981), is an Armenian politician and journalist, member of the National Assembly since she was elected in 2017 parliamentary election for Prosperous Armenia, and re-elected in 2018 election.

== Life and career ==
Born in Yerevan, in Soviet Armenia, she graduated in Journalism from Yerevan State University in 2002, and between 2002 and 2010 worked in Kentron TV. Between 2010 and 2012, she worked as Head of the Public Relations Department of the Minister of Sports and Youth. She is also the spokeswoman of athlete, businessman and leader of Prosperous Armenia party Gagik Tsarukyan and was president of Tsarukyan's foundation.
