= I Have Honor Alliance =

Armenian political alliance (2021–2022)

I Have Honor Alliance Պատիվ ունեմ դաշինք
- Leader: Hayk Mamijanyan
- Founder: Serzh Sargsyan
- Founded: 15 May 2021
- Dissolved: 21 June 2022
- Headquarters: Yerevan
- Ideology: Tseghakronism; Conservatism; Russophilia
- Political position: Centre-right to right-wing
- Members: Republican Party; Homeland Party (former)
- Colours: Red
- Slogan: Straighten Your Back! Let's Get To Work! So We Can Live.

Website
- pativunem.am

I Have Honor (Armenian: Պատիվ ունեմ դաշինք, romanized: Pativ unem dashink') was a political alliance in Armenia. It was founded on 15 May 2021 as an alliance between the Republican Party of Armenia and the Homeland Party. The Homeland Party withdrew from the alliance in June 2022.

== History ==
The alliance was formed during the 2020–2021 Armenian protests. Both the Republican Party and the Homeland Party were previous members of the Homeland Salvation Movement and called on Prime Minister Nikol Pashinyan to resign following Armenia's defeat in the 2020 Nagorno-Karabakh war. Both parties subsequently left the Homeland Salvation Movement to form the I Have Honor alliance. The alliance had confirmed that they would participate in the 2021 Armenian parliamentary elections. Artur Vanetsyan was nominated to lead the alliance. Following the election, the alliance won 5.22% of the popular vote, gaining 6 seats in the National Assembly. On 21 June 2022, Artur Vanetsyan announced that he was withdrawing the Homeland Party from the I Have Honor alliance, effectively dissolving the alliance.

== Ideology ==
The alliance identifies itself as national conservative and supports the strengthening of the military of Armenia, developing the economy, supporting the activities of the Armenian Apostolic Church, and ensuring the self-determination of Artsakh.

== Leadership ==
- Serzh Sargsyan, former Prime Minister and President of Armenia
- Artur Vanetsyan, Chairman of the Homeland Party (resigned from the alliance on 21 June 2022)
- Hayk Mamijanyan, head of the parliamentary faction
- Tigran Abrahamyan, secretary of the parliamentary faction

== Electoral record ==
=== Parliamentary elections ===
Election	Votes	%	Seats	+/–	Position	Government
2021	66,650	5.22	6 / 107	▲6	▲3rd	Opposition

== See also ==
- Programs of political parties in Armenia
