= 2021 Armenian parliamentary election =

- 20 June 2021
- All 101 seats in the National Assembly (plus additional and leveling seats)
- Turnout: 49.37%
Party	Leader	Vote %	Seats	+/–
Civil Contract	Nikol Pashinyan	53.95	71	−11
Armenia Alliance	Robert Kocharyan	21.11	29	New
I Have Honor Alliance	Artur Vanetsyan	5.22	7	New
This lists parties that won seats. See the complete results below.
Prime Minister before	Prime Minister after
Nikol Pashinyan (Interim); My Step Alliance	Nikol Pashinyan; Civil Contract

Snap parliamentary elections were held in Armenia on 20 June 2021. The elections had initially been scheduled for 9 December 2023, but were called earlier due to a political crisis following the 2020 Nagorno-Karabakh War and an alleged attempted coup in February 2021.

Nikol Pashinyan, who had served as prime minister since 2018, resigned in April 2021 and subsequently the seventh National Assembly was dissolved on 10 May. Pashinyan continued to serve as acting prime minister until the elections were held. Following the election, Pashinyan's Civil Contract party received 54% of the vote and won 71 seats, a majority in the 107-seat parliament. The opposition Armenia Alliance, finished second with 29 seats, while the I Have Honor Alliance won 7 seats. No other party or alliance surpassed the electoral threshold required to win a seat. The opposition claimed there had been electoral fraud during the elections, while the OSCE assessed the election as meeting international standards and described it as; "marred by increasingly inflammatory rhetoric" but was "positive overall."

== Background ==
After six weeks of war with Azerbaijan, on 9 November 2020 prime minister Nikol Pashinyan, president of Azerbaijan Ilham Aliyev and Russian president Vladimir Putin reached and signed a ceasefire agreement. Following the announcement of this deal, violent protests erupted in Yerevan. The National Assembly was stormed and its speaker Ararat Mirzoyan was beaten by an angry mob.

Pashinyan faced continuous calls for his resignation and mass rallies calling for him to step down. On 25 February 2021 the Chief of the General Staff of the Armenian Armed Forces Onik Gasparyan and more than 40 other top-ranking generals demanded Pashinyan's resignation, which Pashinyan described as a coup attempt, causing a political crisis that ended with Gasparyan's dismissal.

On 25 April 2021 Pashinyan announced his formal resignation, prompting the dissolution of the National Assembly and the call for snap elections on 20 June of that year.

== Electoral system ==
The members of the unicameral National Assembly were elected by party-list proportional representation. The number of seats was set at a minimum of 101, which could rise when allocation of additional seats is required. Seats were allocated using the d'Hondt method with an election threshold of 5% for parties and 7% for multi-party alliances. However, a minimum of three political groups would be awarded seats enter parliament regardless of the performance of the third-best performing party or alliance.

Four seats were reserved for national minorities (Assyrians, Kurds, Russians and Yazidis), with parties having separate lists for the four groups. A gender quota required any top section of a party list to include at least 33% candidates of each gender.

If a party received a majority of the vote but wins less than 54% of the seats, they would be awarded additional seats to give them 54% of the total. If one party won over two-thirds of the seats, the losing parties which passed the electoral threshold would be given extra seats reducing the share of seats of the winning party to two-thirds. If a government is not formed within six days of the preliminary results being released, a run-off round between the top two parties must be held on the 28th day. The party that won the run-off would be given the additional seats required for a 54% majority, with all seats allocated in the first round preserved.

Despite the COVID-19 pandemic, the Electoral Code did not provide for mail-in voting or early voting.

== Schedule ==
Participating parties and alliances were required to submit applications with all supporting documentation by 18:00 on 26 May. The electoral lists of the political parties and alliances of parties were registered by 31 May.

The official election campaign took place from 7 to 18 June. Voting took place on 20 June from 8am to 8pm.

== Participating political forces ==
Four alliances and 23 parties submitted documents to the Central Electoral Commission (CEC) in order to register for the elections. This is a significant increase in the number of parties competing, as only nine parties and two alliances had competed in the parliamentary elections held two years earlier. Several of the parties and all of the alliances were established in 2020 or 2021, following Armenia's defeat in the 2020 Nagorno-Karabakh war. In total, four alliances and 23 parties participated in the election.

Ballot number	Name of Party or Alliance	Allied parties (candidates each)	Candidate for Prime Minister	Key figures, other candidates	Domestic policy	Geopolitical orientation	Ideology^{b}	Open to coalition with		Number of candidates (main list + minority list - denied registration)^{d}
Ballot number	Name of Party or Alliance	Allied parties (candidates each)	Candidate for Prime Minister	Key figures, other candidates	Domestic policy	Geopolitical orientation	Ideology^{b}	Civil Contract?^{c}	Armenia Alliance?^{c}	Number of candidates (main list + minority list - denied registration)^{d}
1.	Fair Armenia Party «Արդար Հայաստան» կուսակցություն		Norayr Norikyan		Centrist	Pro-European, Pro-Russian	Big tent, economic liberalism	yes	yes	85+0-1
2.	Armenian National Congress Party (HAK) «Հայ Ազգային Կոնգրես» Կուսակցություն		Levon Ter-Petrosyan (former President, 1991–98)	Levon Zurabyan	Centrist	Pro-European, Pro-Western, Pro-Russian	Social liberalism	no	yes	101+3-0
3.	Civil Contract «Քաղացիական պայմանագիր» կուսակցություն	United Labor Party, Mighty Homeland Party	Nikol Pashinyan (incumbent Prime Minister, since 2018)	Ararat Mirzoyan, Lilit Makunts, Suren Papikyan, Khachatur Sukiasyan	Centrist	Pro-European, Pro-Western, Pro-Russian	Liberalism, populism, reformism, anti-corruption	N/A	no	157+4-0
4.	Awakening National Christian Party «Զարթոնք» ազգային քրիստոնեական կուսակցություն		Ara Zohrabyan		Centre-right		Christian democracy	maybe		101+0-9
5.	Freedom Party «Ազատություն» կուսակցություն		Hrant Bagratyan				Modern liberalism	no	yes	86+0-3
6.	I Have Honor Alliance^{a} «Պատիվ ունեմ» դաշինք	Republican Party (137), Homeland Party (45)	Artur Vanetsyan	Serzh Sargsyan (former president, 2008–18), Taron Margaryan	Right	Pro-Russian	National conservatism, Armenian nationalism	no	yes	230+0-0
7.	United Homeland Party «Միասնական Հայրենիք» կուսակցություն		Lusine Avagyan	Mher Terteryan		Pro-Russian	Armenian nationalism			88+0-0
8.	All-Armenian National Statehood Party «Համահայկական ազգային պետականություն» (ՀԱՊ) կուսակցություն		Artur Vardanyan							82+0-0
9.	Bright Armenia Party (LHK) «Լուսավոր Հայաստան» կուսակցություն		Edmon Marukyan	Gevorg Gorgisyan, David Khazhakyan, Ani Samsonyan	Centrist	Pro-Western, Pro-European	Classical liberalism	Against any coalition if candidate for PM is Pashinyan or Kocharyan. May be open to coalition with either of them if Marukyan is candidate.		107+0-0
10.	Armenia is Our Home Party «Մեր տունը Հայաստանն է» կուսակցություն	Alliance Party	Tigran Urikhanyan	Ara Abrahamyan	Centrist	Pro-Russian		improbable	maybe	88+0-0
11.	Republic Party «Հանրապետություն» կուսակցություն		Aram Z. Sargsyan	Artak Zeynalyan	Centrist	Pro-Western, Pro-European	Conservative liberalism	yes	no (only in state of war)	103+0-0
12.	Homeland of Armenians Party «Հայոց Հայրենիք» կուսակցություն		Artak Galstyan	Vardan Ghukasyan						91+0-1
13.	Free Homeland Alliance^{a} «Ազատ Հայրենիք» դաշինք	Union for National Self-Determination (23), Armenian Constructive Party (21), Conservative Party (8), National Democrats Union (7), Green Party (6)	Andreas Ghukasyan	Mikael Hayrapetyan, Paruyr Hayrikyan, Arshak Sadoyan		Pro-Western, Pro-European, Anti-Russian		no	no	83+0-2
14.	Prosperous Armenia Party (BHK) «Բարգավաճ Հայաստան» կուսակցություն		Gagik Tsarukyan	Arman Abovyan	Centre-right	Pro-Russian	Conservatism, Euroscepticism	improbable	maybe	93+3-1
15.	Democratic Party of Armenia; Հայաստանի դեմոկրատական կուսակցություն	Social Democrat Hunchakian Party (4)	Tigran Arzakantsyan ^{e}	Aram G. Sargsyan	Left	Pro-Russian	Democratic socialism		maybe	88+0-2
16.	5165 National Conservative Movement Party «5165 ազգային պահպանողական շարժում» կուսակցություն		Karin Tonoyan				Armenian nationalism			95+0-0
17.	Citizen's Decision Social-Democratic Party «Քաղաքացու որոշում սոցիալ դեմոկրատական» կուսակցություն		Suren Sahakyan		Left		Social democracy, environmentalism, direct democracy	maybe		
18.	Shirinyan-Babajanyan Alliance of Democrats^{a} «Շիրինյան- Բաբաջանյան ժողովրդավարների դաշինք» դաշինք	Christian-Democratic Rebirth Party (48), For The Republic Party (38)	Arman Babajanyan	Levon Shirinyan, Stepan Safaryan		Pro-Western, Pro-European	Liberalism	maybe	improbable	90+0-1
19.	National Agenda Party «Ազգային օրակարգ» կուսակցություն		Ara Hakobyan		Centre-right	Pro-Russian	Armenian nationalism, Armenia-Artsakh unification	no	maybe	84+0-1
20.	Rise Party «Վերելք» կուսակցություն		Aleksan Minasyan				Armenian nationalism	improbable	maybe	81+0-0
21.	Liberal Party «Ազատական» կուսակցություն		Samvel Babayan			Pro-European	Liberalism			80+0-0
22.	Armenian Eagles Unified Armenia Party «Հայոց Արծիվներ Միասնական Հայաստան» կուսակցություն		Khachik Asryan				Armenian nationalism			86+0-0
23.	European Party of Armenia (EPA) «Հայաստանի Եվրոպական» կուսակցություն		Tigran Khzmalyan	Ruben Hakhverdyan	Centrist	Pro-Western, Pro-European, Anti-Russian	Liberalism	maybe	improbable	90+0-1
24.	Armenia Alliance^{a} «Հայաստան» դաշինք	ARF (78), Reborn Armenia (29), One Armenia (1)	Robert Kocharyan (Former President, 1998–2008)	Vahe Hakobyan, Armen Rustamyan, Seyran Ohanyan, Artsvik Minasyan	Centre-left	Pro-Russian	Armenian nationalism	no	N/A	153+3-0
25.	National Democratic Pole «Ազգային-ժողովրդավարական բևեռ» կուսակցություն	Sasna Tsrer Pan-Armenian Party, National Progress Party of Armenia	Vahe Gasparyan	Jirair Sefilian, Varuzhan Avetisyan		Pro-Western, Pro-European, Anti-Russian	Armenian nationalism	improbable	improbable	114+0-4
26.	Sovereign Armenia Party «Ինքնիշխան Հայաստան» կուսակցություն		Davit Sanasaryan		Centrist	Pro-Western, Pro-European		no	no	85+1-0

Notes:

- ^aRegistered as an alliance, implying 7% election threshold
- ^bDiverse estimates.
- ^cYes/No - as claimed; other info - as estimated.
- ^d5% for parties and 7% for registered alliances.
- ^ewas removed from election list after failing to prove residency in Armenia

=== Declined participation or failed to register ===
The Christian-Democratic Rebirth Party decided to withdraw its application to participate in the elections as an independent entity; instead the party participated as a part of the Shirinyan-Babajanyan Alliance of Democrats.

On 21 April, the Free Democrats confirmed they would participate in the elections, but ultimately, failed to register.

On 7 June leader of the Armenian Eagles Unified Armenia Party, Khachik Asryan, said that his party is terminating their election campaign and won't participate in elections. He called to cancel elections at large until the border regions of Armenia are liberated from Azerbaijani occupation.

The Democratic Way Party boycotted the election, claiming the election would be rigged.

The Democratic Consolidation Party did not participate in the elections stating that the threat of war should be a more serious concern to Armenia.

The Heritage party decided not to participate to prevent the reelection of Nikol Pashinyan.

== Endorsements ==
Armenian National Congress

Individuals

- Karen Matevosyan, art historian, researcher at Matenadaran
Armenia Alliance

Individuals

- Karen Karapetyan, former prime minister and former mayor of Yerevan
- Onik Gasparyan, Chief of the General Staff of the Armed Forces of Armenia
- Vitaly Balasanyan, secretary of the National Security Council of Artsakh
- Gevorg Danielyan, former chairman of the Supreme Judicial Council
- Samvel Darbinyan, former mayor of Vanadzor
- Tatul Manaseryan, economist, former MP
- Razmik Davoyan, poet
- Sirusho, singer
- Nersik Ispiryan, singer
- Levon Javakhyan, writer
- Meruzhan Ter-Gulanyan, writer
- Ashot Melkonyan, historian, head of the Institute of History of the Armenian Academy of Sciences
- Martin Vardazaryan

Political parties

- Liberal Democratic Union of Armenia
I Have Honor Alliance

Individuals

- Mikayel Minasyan, former ambassador of Armenia to the Holy See

Political parties

- My Powerful Community
Bright Armenia

Individuals

- Garik Martirosyan, Russian/Armenian entertainer, comedian, TV host, actor and singer
European Party of Armenia

Individuals

- Ruben Hakhverdyan, poet

== Opinion polls ==
Date	Pollster	Armenia Alliance	My Step / CC	I Have Honor / RPA	PAP	Bright Armenia	FD	Republic	NDP / ST	ARF
20 Jun 2021	Final results	21.11	53.95	5.22	3.95	1.22	–	3.04	1.49	–
11-18 June	Gallup International Armenia	28.7	25.2	10.8	5.4	5.2	-	2.6	0.7	-
31 May-16 June	Armenian Election Study	12	24	1	2	-	-	2	2	-
6-10 June 2021	Gallup International Armenia	24.1	23.8	7.4	3.7	3.1	-	2.3	0.8	-
31 May - 4 June 2021	Gallup International Armenia	20.6	22.4	3.9	4.2	2.9	-	2.1	1.5	-
25–28 May 2021	Gallup International Armenia	17.5	22.9	2.7	3.8	2.3	-	2.8	1.7	-
18–21 May 2021	Gallup International Armenia	14.3 34 seats (33+1) 32% seats	24.8 61 seats (58+3) 58% seats	3.1	4.1 10 seats 9.5% seats	2.0	-	2.5	1	-
23–27 Apr 2021	Gallup International Armenia	8.1	27.2	1.8	3․7	1.8	-	-	1.1	1.1
26–29 Mar 2021	Gallup International Armenia	5.9	31.7	2.4	4.4	2.7	-	0.4	0.5	2.1
8 April–4 May 2021	IRI/Breavis	-	26	1	1	1	1	1	1	1
15–17 Feb 2021	Gallup International Armenia	-	33.1	2.2	4.4	2.6	-	0.7	0.4	2.2
8–16 Feb 2021	IRI/Breavis	-	33	1	3	1	-	-	1	1
10–27 June 2020	Gallup International Armenia	-	55	1.4	6	5	-	-	0.1	1.8
9 Nov–1 Dec 2019	Gallup International Armenia	-	61.3	1.5	14.2	3.9	-	-	1.1	2.5
20 Sep–13 Oct 2019	IRI/Breavis	-	55	4	19	6	1	1	-	3
6–31 May 2019	IRI/Breavis	-	59	5	12	4	-	-	1	4
30 Apr–9 May 2019	Gallup International Armenia	-	60	1.6	11.9	4.6	-	-	1.21	1.6
9 Dec 2018	Parliamentary elections		70.42	4.70	8.26	6.37	2.00			

View source data.

== Conduct ==
Eight monitoring missions, including from the OSCE/ODIHR and the CIS registered to observe the elections. A total of 250 short-term observers arrived from the ODHIR and 70 observers from various CIS countries, monitored the elections.

There were 8 monitoring missions in the 2018 parliamentary elections and 6 missions in the 2017 parliamentary elections.

Due to the alignment of the election procedures with the OSCE recommendations, Freedom House reclassified Armenia as an electoral democracy.

== Results ==
In the evening of 20 June Tigran Mukuchyan, head of the Central Electoral Commission, announced the preliminary results; Pashinyan's Civil Contract party was leading with 58.5 percent of the vote and 72 seats of the National Assembly, 16 less than in 2018, while former president Robert Kocharyan's Armenia Alliance had 18.8 percent with 27 seats. The third political force was I Have Honor Alliance, with 5.23 percent and 6 seats. (Note: Although the coalition did not reach the 7% of votes required to enter the Assembly, the Assembly's regulations require that at least three political forces be represented, regardless of whether they reach 7% of the total votes.)

Acting prime minister Nikol Pashinyan claimed victory in the snap election but moments later Kocharyan's alliance rejected the outcome, saying it would not recognize the results until alleged voting irregularities were addressed. Meanwhile, Tigran Mukuchyan stated "On the whole, the election was conducted in accordance with the country's legislation."

President Armen Sarkissian called on his compatriots to remain peaceful, because it would be unacceptable to "overstep political and moral boundaries, escalate the situation and foment hatred and enmity".

On 21 June the Central Electoral Commission confirmed the results.

Amid speculation that the elected Armenia Alliance deputies would not accept the position in an attempt to boycott parliament, on 22 June Kocharyan stated in an interview that he believed they should accept it but "I don't see myself in the parliament because I am more of an executive". At the same time, he affirmed that the alliance would soon submit to the Constitutional Court a report proving the existence of violations of the electoral procedure. He also acknowledged that the cause of his defeat could be the lack of work during the campaign in rural areas.

Party	Votes	%	Seats	+/–
Civil Contract	688,761	53.95	71	–11
Armenia Alliance	269,481	21.11	29	New
I Have Honor Alliance	66,650	5.22	7	New
Prosperous Armenia	50,444	3.95	0	–26
Hanrapetutyun Party	38,758	3.04	0	0
Armenian National Congress	19,691	1.54	0	0
Shirinyan-Babajanyan Alliance of Democrats	19,212	1.50	0	0
National Democratic Pole	18,976	1.49	0	New
Bright Armenia	15,591	1.22	0	–18
5165 National Conservative Movement Party	15,549	1.22	0	New
Liberal Party	14,936	1.17	0	New
Homeland of Armenians Party	13,130	1.03	0	New
Armenia is Our Home	12,149	0.95	0	New
Democratic Party of Armenia	5,020	0.39	0	0
Awakening National Christian Party	4,619	0.36	0	New
Free Homeland Alliance	4,119	0.32	0	New
Sovereign Armenia Party	3,915	0.31	0	New
Fair Armenia Party	3,914	0.31	0	New
Citizen's Decision	3,775	0.30	0	0
European Party of Armenia	2,440	0.19	0	New
Freedom Party	1,844	0.14	0	0
Rise Party	1,233	0.10	0	New
United Homeland Party	964	0.08	0	New
All-Armenian National Statehood Party	803	0.06	0	New
National Agenda Party	719	0.06	0	New
Total	1,276,693	100.00	107	–25
Valid votes	1,276,693	99.63		
Invalid/blank votes	4,682	0.37		
Total votes	1,281,375	100.00		
Registered voters/turnout	2,595,334	49.37		
Source: news.am, CEC, Hetq

== Reactions ==
International

- Council of Europe: The Council of Europe Secretary General Marija Pejčinović Burić sent a congratulatory message to Nikol Pashinyan on the successful conduct of the parliamentary elections and confirmed that the elections were generally well organized. The statement further read, "I reaffirm the readiness of the Council of Europe to continue to support Armenia in the reform process, based on the standards of human rights, democracy and the rule of law."
- European Union: President of the European Council, Charles Michel, said "warm congratulations to Nikol Pashinyan on elections victory. The EU stands by Armenia in support of deepening reforms. We are also ready to further support regional stabilisation and comprehensive conflict settlement."
- Organization for Security and Co-operation in Europe: OSCE said in a statement that the elections were "competitive and generally well-managed within a short timeframe." The OSCE observers noted that they were "characterized by intense polarization and marred by increasingly inflammatory rhetoric among key contestants" but assessed the election day and the vote count "positively overall."
- United States: The United States Department of State issued a press statement congratulating the Armenian people and acknowledging that "voters' human rights and fundamental freedoms were generally respected, contestants were able to campaign freely, and that ODIHR assessed election-day vote counting as positive." Also called for "respect the results of these elections once certified, employ the legal election grievance process to address issues of concern, and avoid political retaliation."
- Canada: The Canadian Foreign Ministry congratulated Armenian authorities on concluding successful parliamentary elections. "We look forward to collaborating with our Armenian partners to continue our efforts to promote democracy in the country as well as a resolution of the Nagorno Karabakh conflict", the statement read.
- Russia: Kremlin Press Secretary Dmitry Peskov said that Pashinyan won a "convincing victory."

Armenia and Diaspora

- The Future Armenian public initiative congratulated the citizens of Armenia on concluding snap parliamentary elections during difficult times for the country, and expressed a hope that "the representatives of the elected parties will serve by working hard to ensure solidarity across all Armenians, overcoming unprecedented challenges to strengthen the state and nation".

== See also ==
- Elections in Armenia
- List of political parties in Armenia
- Programs of political parties in Armenia
