= Homeland Salvation Movement =

2020–2021 political alliance in Armenia

Homeland Salvation Movement Հայրենիքի փրկության շարժում
- Leader: Vazgen Manukyan
- Founded: December 3, 2020
- Headquarters: Yerevan, Armenia
- Ideology: Armenian nationalism Russophilia
- Political position: Big tent
- Alliance of: Armenian Revolutionary Federation; Homeland Party; National Democratic Union; Prosperous Armenia; Republican Party of Armenia; One Armenia Party; Apricot Country Party; National Agenda Party; Constitutional Rights Union
- Slogan: "Nation, Army, Victory"

Website
- Facebook page

The Homeland Salvation Movement (Armenian: Հայրենիքի փրկության շարժում, romanized: Hayrenik’i p’rkut’yan sharzhum) was an Armenian political alliance, consisting of several opposition political parties, led by Vazgen Manukyan.

== History ==
The alliance was established on 3 December 2020 from the dissatisfaction of the Government of Armenia's handling of the 2020 Nagorno-Karabakh war. The alliance was critical of the 2020 Nagorno-Karabakh ceasefire agreement which followed and actively called for the Prime Minister of Armenia, Nikol Pashinyan to resign. The alliance had proposed for itself to assume interim power, which would then be followed by elections.

On 3 December 2020, the Homeland Salvation Movement announced former Prime Minister Vazgen Manukyan as their candidate to lead an interim government. Vazgen Manukyan had stated that, "We must be ready to take power by rebelling with lightning speed" and had previously called for an uprising to oust Nikol Pashinyan in late January 2021. A criminal case for 'threats to violently overthrow constitutional order' has been launched by Armenia's Prosecutor General in response to Manukyan's comments. Manukyan doesn't accept the charge and considers it political persecution. Manukyan also stated that he does not seek to remain in power, but only to be a transitional Prime Minister and would organize elections that will be held one year from when he takes office. He had rejected calls for elections taking place while Pashinyan remains Prime Minister and said if such an election were to happen, he would boycott it.

Prior to the 2021 Armenian parliamentary elections, most members of the Homeland Salvation Movement splintered from the alliance in order to form new political alliances to participate in the elections, thus eliminating the option for the Homeland Salvation Movement to participate as a united bloc. Several other members, as well as, Vazgen Manukyan, opted not to participate in the election. Vazgen Manukyan continues to head the Council of the Homeland Salvation Movement.

== Membership ==
As of March 2021, several political parties had joined the alliance, including:

- Alliance Party
- Apricot Country Party
- Armenian Revolutionary Federation
- Homeland Party
- National Agenda Party
- National Democratic Union
- One Armenia Party
- Prosperous Armenia
- Republican Party of Armenia
- Solidarity Party

Key individuals within the alliance, include:

- Ishkhan Saghatelyan
- Artur Vanetsyan
- Gagik Tsarukyan
- Naira Zohrabyan
- Arpine Hovhannisyan

Supported by:

- Serzh Sargsyan
- Robert Kocharyan
- Seyran Ohanyan
- Yuri Khachaturov
- Vitaly Balasanyan
- Orinats Yerkir (political party)

== Ideology ==
The alliance supported establishing national unity, upholding the territorial integrity of Armenia and the Republic of Artsakh, supporting the Armed Forces of Armenia, and maintaining cooperation with Russia.

== Activities ==
Thousands of Homeland Salvation Movement supporters rally in central Yerevan, 25 March 2021.

The alliance organized several rallies in Yerevan and throughout Armenia. The alliance announced it would take part in daily street protests until Prime Minister Nikol Pashinyan resigns. Several supporters were arrested by police for civil disobedience.

In February 2021, Yuri Khatchaturov, former Secretary-General of the Collective Security Treaty Organization spoke to supporters during a rally in Yerevan.

On 3 March 2021, the alliance met with the President of Armenia, Armen Sarksyan, and exchanged views on the ways to resolve the crisis in the country and reduce tensions caused by recent events.

On 9 March 2021, while demanding the resignation of the Prime Minister, alliance supporters blocked entries to the National Assembly and several major roads throughout downtown Yerevan, paralyzing traffic for several days.

== Criticism ==
The alliance did not garner widespread support from the Armenian public, as many believed the alliance and its leaders represented pre-revolution values. Many feared that the alliance was corrupt, untrustworthy, and was aiming to seize power without having the support of the people. Furthermore, the alliance received criticism for stirring up extreme and hateful rhetoric among supporters during rallies.

== Recent developments ==
The alliance lost some influence as Nikol Pashinyan's ruling My Step Alliance had retained general support among the Armenian public, despite Armenia's loss in the 2020 Nagorno-Karabakh war.

There was also continued debate within the alliance if member parties will participate together or separately in future elections. In addition, it had been suggested that the Prosperous Armenia party and the Homeland Party may both leave the Homeland Salvation Movement to form a new alliance among themselves. Meanwhile, some parties within the alliance, like the Armenian Revolutionary Federation do not have much popularity within Armenia.

Furthermore, the rise of another political alliance known as the National Democratic Pole had seen a surge in popularity. Unlike the Homeland Salvation Movement, the National Democratic Pole campaigned on a Pro-Western and Pro-European base and called for Armenia's alignment with the European Union, NATO, and the United States, as a result of frustration from Russia's treatment of Armenia during the 2020 Nagorno-Karabakh war. The National Democratic Pole is critical of the Homeland Salvation Movement, and accuses the alliance of serving Russia's interests above all.

Although initially supporting the Homeland Salvation Movement, Suren Surenyants, Chairman of the Democratic Alternative Party, announced on 21 January 2021 that the party was leaving the alliance.

In April 2021, the Constitutional Rights Union left the Homeland Salvation Movement to join the "New Union" alliance with the Towards Russia Party and the Voice of the Nation Party.

In May 2021, the Republican Party of Armenia and the Homeland Party announced that they would form their own political alliance, known as the I Have Honor Alliance.

In April 2021, Robert Kocharyan stated that he does not wish to lead the Homeland Salvation Movement and that the alliance would not participate in the elections as a united bloc. He stated that although Vazgen Manukyan would not participate in the elections either, that Manukyan could still manage the Homeland Salvation Movement.

In May 2021, Robert Kocharyan announced the creation of the Armenia Alliance, a new political alliance with the Armenian Revolutionary Federation and Reborn Armenia, and that the new alliance would participate in elections without the Homeland Salvation Movement.

Following the June 2021 elections, there has been no activity from the Homeland Salvation Movement.

== See also ==
- Programs of political parties in Armenia
- 2020−2021 Armenian protests
- 2021 Armenian political crisis
