= 2020–2021 Armenian protests =

Series of protests in Armenia

2020−2021 Armenian protests
- Part of Armenian political crisis (2020–present)
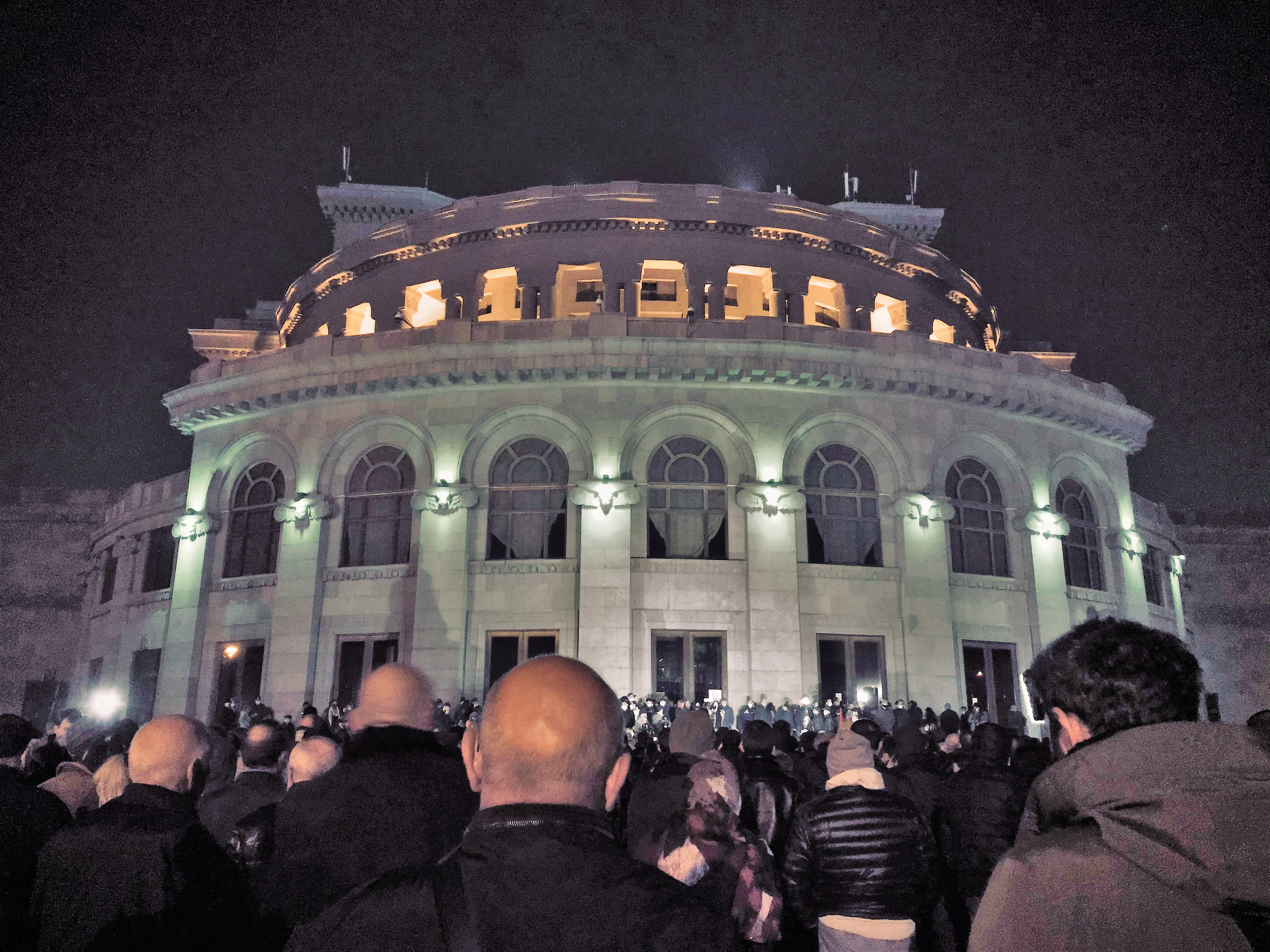
- Protests in front of Yerevan Opera House against the terms of the 2020 Nagorno-Karabakh ceasefire agreement
- Date: 10 November 2020 – 25 April 2021
- Location: Armenia: Yerevan, Gyumri, Vanadzor
- Caused by: A cease-fire agreement signed by Prime Minister of Armenia Nikol Pashinyan; Government mishandling of the COVID-19 pandemic
- Goals: Cancellation of the ceasefire agreement in Nagorno-Karabakh (previously); Resignation of Prime Minister Nikol Pashinyan (succeeded); Formation of a 1-year interim national unity government followed by snap elections
- Methods: Demonstrations, civil unrest, street blockades
- Status: Ended: Failed coup d'état attempt; Armenian parliamentary election; Resignation of Nikol Pashinyan to trigger snap elections; Nikol Pashinyan continues to serve as interim prime minister until 20 June elections; Nikol Pashinyan reelected in 20 June elections
- Result: Early elections scheduled for 20 June 2021

Parties
(Armenia) Anti-government protesters: Opponents of the signed agreement; Ethnic Armenians displaced from Nagorno-Karabakh as a result of the war; Relatives of dead, injured, and prisoner of war soldiers.; Homeland Salvation Movement: Armenian Revolutionary Federation; Homeland Party; National Democratic Union; Prosperous Armenia; Republican Party of Armenia; One Armenia Party; Apricot Country Party; National Democratic Pole: Sasna Tsrer Pan-Armenian Party; European Party of Armenia (former member); National Progress Party of Armenia; Union for National Self-Determination (supportive)	Government of Armenia: My Step Alliance; National Security Service

Lead figures
(Armenia) Vazgen Manukyan; Ishkhan Saghatelyan (Armenia) Artur Vanetsyan (Armenia) Gagik Tsarukyan (Armenia) Naira Zohrabyan (Armenia) Arpine Hovhannisyan Supported by: (Armenia) Serzh Sargsyan (Armenia) Robert Kocharyan (Armenia) Seyran Ohanyan (Armenia) Yuri Khachaturov	(Armenia) Nikol Pashinyan (Prime Minister); Armen Sarkissian (President) (Armenia) Vahe Ghazaryan (police chief)

Casualties
- Detained: 362+ people

The 2020−2021 Armenian protests (also known as the March of Dignity; Armenian: Արժանապատվության երթ, romanized: Arzhanapatvut'yan yert') were a series of protests that began following the Nagorno-Karabakh ceasefire agreement on 10 November 2020. After Prime Minister Nikol Pashinyan announced that he signed an agreement to cede Armenian-occupied territories in Azerbaijan and put an end to six weeks of hostilities over the Nagorno-Karabakh region, thousands of people took to the streets, and hundreds stormed the Parliament building in the capital Yerevan. Protests continued throughout November, with demonstrations in Yerevan and other cities demanding the resignation of Nikol Pashinyan.

The protests were led by two different political coalitions: the National Democratic Pole, a pro-Western and pro-European alliance consisting of several political figures, and the Homeland Salvation Movement, a pro-Russian alliance consisting of several opposition parties. The former ruling Republican Party, the largest opposition party in parliament at the time, Prosperous Armenia, and the Armenian Revolutionary Federation joined the Homeland Salvation Movement. On 3 December 2020, the Homeland Salvation Movement announced former prime minister Vazgen Manukyan as their candidate to lead an interim government for a period of one year. Meanwhile, the National Democratic Pole, led by the Sasna Tsrer Pan-Armenian Party and formerly the European Party of Armenia, had also proposed for itself to lead an interim government for a period of one year.

In addition to the two political coalitions, numerous public figures had called on Prime Minister Pashinyan to resign, including the then president of Armenia, Armen Sarkissian, former president Levon Ter-Petrosyan, both catholicoi of the Armenian Apostolic Church, Karekin II and Aram I, and Edmon Marukyan leader of the then third-largest party in parliament Bright Armenia (who announced his own candidacy for the office of prime minister) as well as several regional governors and mayors. In early December, the ban on mass gatherings and strikes stipulated by martial law imposed in September was lifted. On 22 December, a general strike was called that reinvigorated the protests.

On 25 February 2021, Chief of the General Staff of the Armenian Armed Forces Onik Gasparyan and more than 40 other high-ranking military officers issued a statement calling for Pashinyan's resignation, which Pashinyan denounced as an attempted military coup. On 18 March 2021, Pashinyan announced early parliamentary elections, to take place on 20 June 2021. Pashinyan confirmed he would resign as Prime Minister in April 2021 but would continue to serve as interim prime minister until snap elections were held.

== Background ==
During the 2020 Nagorno-Karabakh war, which began on 27 September 2020, Azerbaijani forces seized control of many settlements, including the strategically important city of Shusha after a three-day-long battle. The war ended in an Azerbaijani victory on 9 November, and a ceasefire was signed between both parties and Russia. According to the agreement, Armenian and Azerbaijani forces will remain in their positions until Armenia returns territories it occupied surrounding Nagorno-Karabakh (Kalbajar, Aghdam, and Lachin Districts excluding the Lachin Corridor) back to Azerbaijan. Azerbaijan will retain all territories gained during the war, and around 2,000 Russian peacekeeping forces will be deployed in the remaining territory. While the deal was widely celebrated in Azerbaijan, it was viewed as a disastrous defeat in Armenia, and some Armenians quickly took to the streets. Protestors called Prime Minister Pashinyan a "traitor", and demanded him to step down, nullify the peace agreement, and restart the war.

== Protests ==
=== 10 November ===
On 10 November, when the protests erupted, there were fights as protesters tried to get over to the podium to speak and were shouted down, with some throwing bottles. Protesters also seized the parliament building by breaking a metal door, and pulled the President of the National Assembly of Armenia Ararat Mirzoyan from a car, demanding to know the whereabouts of Pashinyan. He was beaten by the protesters and later taken to hospital, where he underwent surgery and was said to be in good condition.

The Prime Minister's daughter Mariam Pashinyan said on her Facebook page that the demonstrators entered the room of her younger sisters. The AFP news agency reported that the police authorities who were present did little to prevent the disorder and people roamed the hallways of the government building, where the doors had been opened and the contents in the offices were thrown around.

=== 11 November ===
At about 04:00, a group of approximately 40 people attempted to break into the Yerevan office of Azatutyun, the Armenian service of Radio Free Europe/Radio Liberty (RFE/RL). Executive producer Artak Hambardzumyan said that the group first shouted at the Azatutyun offices, calling its employees "Turks" and traitors, and demanded that its journalists leave the country. The attackers also kicked and punched the office door, unsuccessfully trying to break in and "take Azatutyun’s server." The protesters also ransacked the Open Society Foundation office in downtown Yerevan. On the same day, six people were detained on suspicion of organizing mass riots, and calling to seize power and to overthrow the constitutional order.

The Armenian Prosecutor General's Office urged the citizens to refrain from organizing, holding or participating in rallies, while clashes broke out between the protestors, who were chanting "Nikol is a traitor!", and the Armenian security forces on Freedom Square in Yerevan, where three law enforcement officers were injured. The protesters then moved to the building of the Government of Armenia. The Armenian opposition announced the creation of the National Salvation Committee in response to the arrests. The protests concluded at late night.

=== 12 November ===
At midday, a small group of protesters gathered at the Matenadaran Mesrop Mashtots Institute of Ancient Manuscripts and at the Yerevan Opera Theatre, demanding the release of political prisoners and Pashinyan's resignation. Then, the opposition party Sasna Tsrer held a rally on Yerevan's Freedom Square. The Armenian police, having pulled up additional forces to the area, broke up the rally and arrested its participants.

=== 13 November ===
A rally organized by 17 opposition parties took in Yerevan throughout the day, demanding the resignation of Pashinyan. The protestors also mourned the fallen Armenians with candelight.

=== 18 November ===
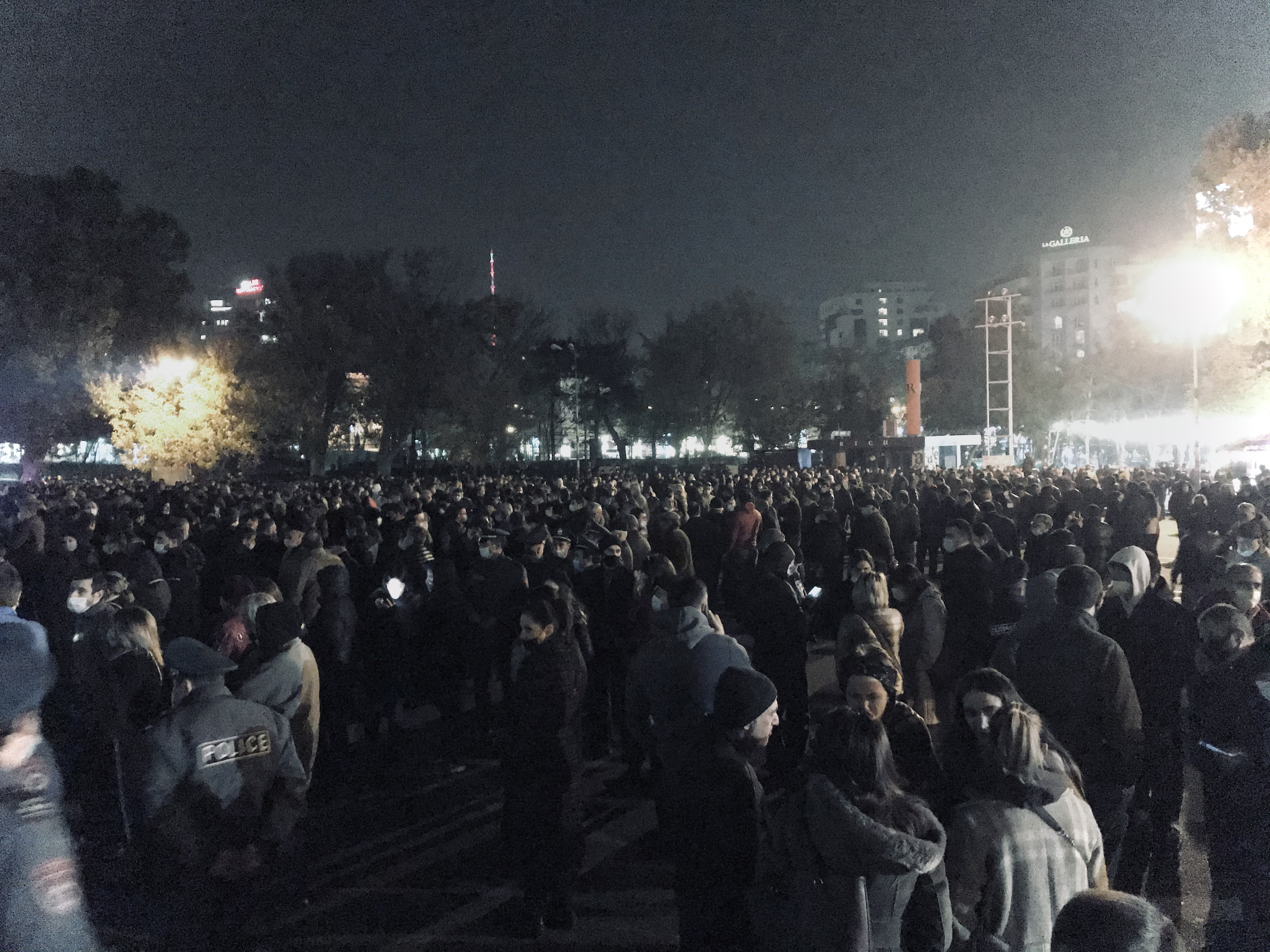
Demonstrations at Freedom Square, Yerevan

More protests erupted near the building of the National Assembly of Armenia, demanding Pashinyan's resignation, with the parliamentary opposition boycott the session of the National Assembly.

=== 19 November ===
More protests erupted in Yerevan, with anti-Pashinyan protestors blocking the streets. The police, trying to restore traffic, pushed the protesters to the sidewalk.

=== 20 November ===
More protests erupted in Yerevan, with anti-Pashinyan protestors blocking Baghramyan Avenue, and Tigran Mets Avenue. The police units, as well as the military police, intervened, detaining dozens of activists. More protests were reported in others streets of the city, with reported police brutality. In Gyumri, the protestors, demanding the resignation Pashinyan, also blocked the streets.

=== 26 November ===
Protests erupted in Ijevan, demanding Pashinyan's resignation.

=== 3 December ===
Protests erupted in Yerevan against the ceasefire of the 2020 Nagorno-Karabakh war and the government. Their demands were new parliamentary elections, a new government and also ceding Nagorno-Karabakh from Azerbaijan. The 17 opposition parties in Armenia, which have been staging protests demanding the resignation of Prime Minister Nikol Pashinyan, announced that Vazgen Manukyan, Armenia's first prime minister, is their candidate to lead a proposed “national accord” government. Police clashes with the protesters and then detained protesters. Hundreds attended the protests.

=== 5 December ===
Mass protests demanding the resignation of the government took place nationwide and chanted against the prime minister. Anti-regime protests saw thousands attend and clap on many streets in cities throughout the country. The protesters marched to the residence of the prime minister. The opposition's candidate for prime minister Vazgen Manukyan gave a speech where he issued an ultimatum to Prime Minister Pashinyan to resign by 8 December, and warned him that if he did not leave office voluntarily that "the enraged people would tear him apart".

=== 8 December ===
Protests resumed in Armenia after Prime Minister Pashinyan ignored the opposition's ultimatum to resign. Hundreds attended the demonstrations in Yerevan and opposition supporters staged anti-government protests and rallies in other cities. The opposition organised acts of civil disobedience and blocked streets in Yerevan.

=== 9 December ===
On 9 December, around 15,000 people protested in Yerevan in front of the Armenian parliament building while Prime Minister Pashinyan addressed the parliament. Pashinyan stated that he would only resign if the people demanded it, and that the demands of the opposition and other groups should not be confused with the demands of the people.

=== 11 December ===
Several hundred supporters of the opposition protested outside the main government building in Yerevan on 10 December while Pashinyan's government held its session. Police used force to unblock streets and detained 101 protestors in Yerevan.

=== 12 December – 21 December ===
Small intermittent protests still occurred.

=== 22 December – 25 December ===
A strike was called on 22 December that included support from the subway workers, Yerevan State University members and 17 opposition parties, again calling for the Pashinyan's resignation. The protests grew in size as the opposition set up tents in Republic Square. While there were arrests made, the protests were peaceful. Thousands of protesters marched in the streets of Yerevan in support of the opposition. Pashinyan rejected calls to resign on 23 December and the next day.

On 23 December, Garnik Isagulyan, Chairman of the National Security Party, was arrested for inciting mob violence against Nikol Pashinyan.

=== January 2021 ===
On 14 January, the Homeland Salvation Movement announced that it would hold rallies in the provinces of Armenia.

On 15 January, Vazgen Manukyan and other opposition figures met people in Gyumri, and went to Vanadzor the next day. A number of residents of Shirak Province unsuccessfully attempted to prevent Manukyan from entering Gyumri by blocking the highway. Manukyan later referred to them as "bums" who had been paid by the ruling "My Step" coalition, which prompted criticism.

On 26 January, while holding a rally in the town of Ararat in Ararat Province, Manukyan stated that if the constitutional route to remove Nikol Pashinyan from power did not work, then they would need to carry out a "rebellion", and clarified when asked by journalists that he meant "seizing buildings and forcibly changing the government, of course, without physical violence." The next day the Prosecutor General's Office declared that it had studied the video of Manukyan making this statement and sent it to the National Security Service.

In an interview given on 27 January, ex-president of Armenia and Homeland Salvation Movement supporter Robert Kocharyan declared his intention to participate in the coming snap elections, the date of which has not yet been determined. The opposition's candidate Vazgen Manukyan had earlier rejected the idea of snap elections while Pashinyan remains in power, asserting that Pashinyan would falsify the elections. In early February, opposition leader Ishkhan Saghatelyan of the ARF stated that the coalition members were divided over whether or not to participate in snap elections. The Prosperous Armenia Party, the Homeland Party and ex-president Kocharyan are reportedly in favor of participating, while Serzh Sargsyan's Republican Party is in favor of boycotting snap elections held by Pashinyan's government.

On 28 January, former MP of the Republic of Artsakh Vahan Badasyan, who is not associated with the Homeland Salvation Movement, held a rally at Yerablur Military Pantheon, where he stated that Prime Minister Pashinyan had to be removed as an enemy and "eliminated" if necessary, and when asked by journalists to clarify, he stated "physically [eliminated], by arms." Badasyan was arrested and charged with "making public calls to seize power, violate territorial integrity or violently overthrow the constitutional order."

=== February 2021 ===
On 23 February, thousands gathered in opposition protests in downtown Yerevan for the latest protest demanding Prime Minister Nikol Pashinyan's resignation. Dozens were arrested.

On 25 February, the General Staff of the Armenian Armed Forces released a statement demanding Pashinyan's resignation. The leadership of the Homeland Salvation Movement welcomed the generals' statement and held a rally in Freedom Square in support of the army.

On 26 February, Tigran Khzmalyan, the Chairman of the European Party of Armenia and former member of the National Democratic Pole, stated that Armenia must remain democratic and to be cautious of Russian interference in Armenia's domestic affairs, during a protest in Yerevan.

=== March 2021 ===
External videos
- Pashinyan's supporters hold a protest in Republic Square, Yerevan on YouTube

On 5 March, Ara Papian, a key figure of the National Democratic Pole, called for strengthening bilateral relations with the United States and proclaimed that Armenia should increase its cooperation with NATO, during a rally in Yerevan.

On 15 March, the National Democratic Pole alliance marched in front of the French embassy in Yerevan. Participants called for developing a strategic partnership and greater military cooperation between Armenia and France.

On 18 March, Prime Minister Nikol Pashinyan announced early parliamentary elections, to take place on 20 June 2021.

=== April 2021 ===
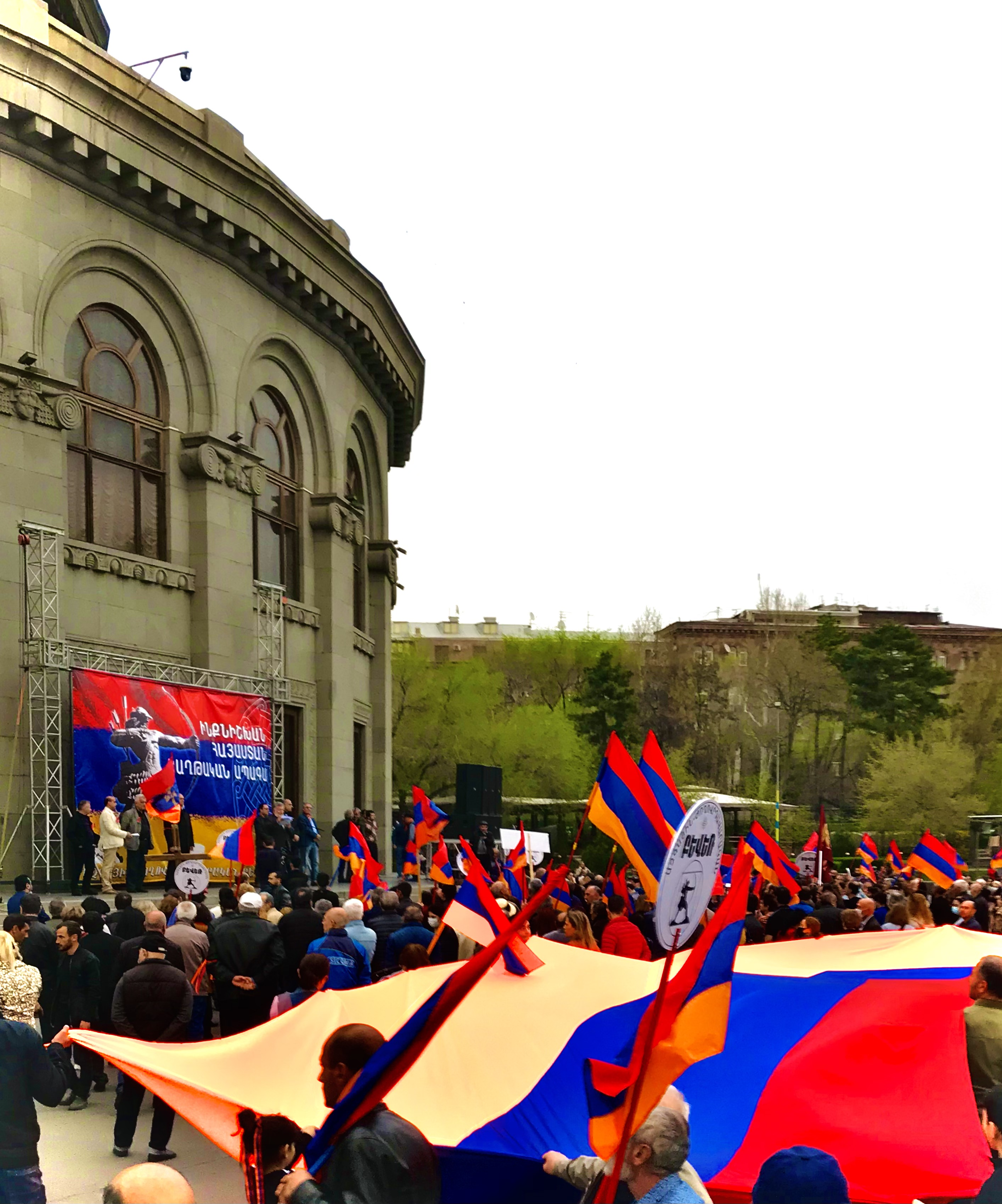
Demonstrations of the National Democratic Pole on 9 April 2021

On 1 April, a group of five political parties, including the Hanrapetutyun Party, Sovereign Armenia, Fair Armenia, For The Republic and the United Labour Party, signed a joint declaration calling on the Government of Armenia to ensure free and fair upcoming elections, following the on-going political unrest in the country.

On 9 April, the National Democratic Pole held a large rally in Yerevan, leaders called for an end to "Russian-Turkish" colonization over Armenia and support a fully sovereign Armenia.

On 15 April, eight political parties, including Heritage, the Social Justice Party, Democratic Homeland Party, Armenian Constructive Party, Hayk Party and the Conservative Party, signed a joint declaration calling on the President of Armenia to ensure that democracy and the Constitution of Armenia is upheld in the country during the on-going political crisis.

=== May 2021 ===
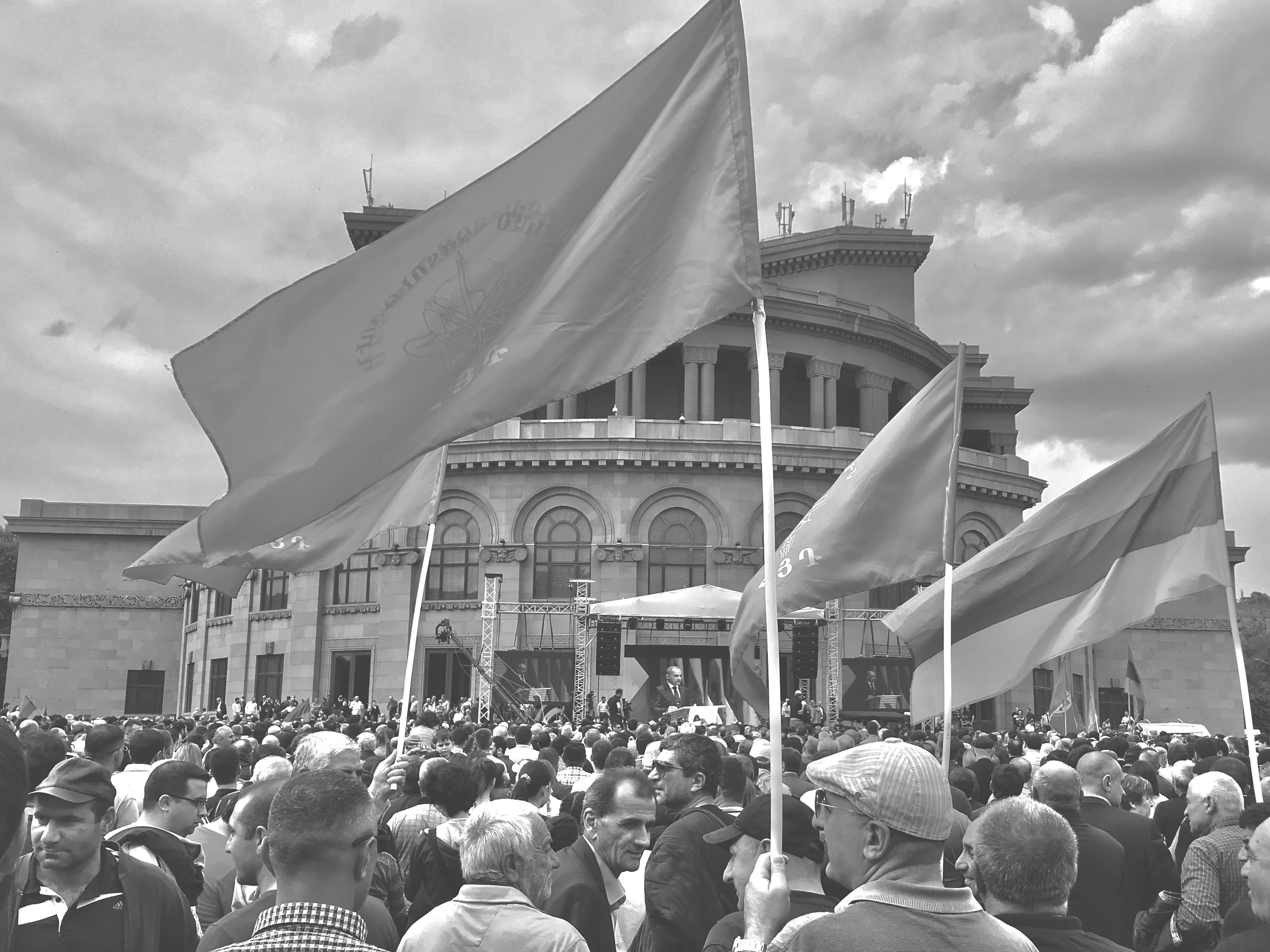
Several thousand Armenians rallied in Yerevan on 9 May 2021 to show their support for a new political alliance, Armenia Alliance, created by former president Robert Kocharyan.

On 9 May, thousands of supporters of former Armenian President Robert Kocharyan and his newly established political alliance, Armenia Alliance, gathered at Freedom Square in Yerevan. The alliance consists of the Armenian Revolutionary Federation and the Reborn Armenia Party.

== Arrests ==
As of 11 November, more than 362 people have been detained by the Armenian police for participating in the protests.

On 11 November, Armenian law enforcement officers detained Gagik Tsarukyan, the leader of the Prosperous Armenia Party (Tsarukyan was released the next day), while Armenia's ex-president Serzh Sargsyan was summoned by the Armenian National Security Service for questioning. Then, the National Security Service arrested Eduard Sharmazanov, the press secretary of the Republican Party and the former deputy chairman of the Armenian National Assembly. He was released the next day and later charged with "organization of mass disorder". On 12 November, Artsvik Minasyan, member of the supreme body of the Armenian Revolutionary Federation, Arsen Babayan, member of the Homeland Party, and Ara Hakobyan, chairman of the National Agenda Party, were all summoned by the Armenian NSS. Babayan was later charged with "organization of mass disorder". On the same day, one of the organizers of the rallies, opposition politician and ex-director of the National Security Service Artur Vanetsyan, was arrested for plotting to overthrow the government and kill the country's prime minister Nikol Pashinyan. Vanetsyan, alongside the ex-head of the Republican Party Vahram Baghdasaryan, ARF politician Ashot Avagyan, as well as commander of the Sisian Volunteer Detachment Ashot Minasyan were charged. All four were released days later after a Yerevan court ruled their detention unlawful. On 13 November, chairman of the supreme council of the Armenian Revolutionary Federation Ishkhan Saghatelyan was summoned to the NSS. On 14 November, another ARF politician Artsvik Minasyan was detained, while MPs representing the Prosperous Armenia Party Naira Zohrabyan, Shake Isayan, Iveta Tonoyan, Vahe Enfiajyan, Gevorg Petrosyan, and Mikayel Melkumyan were summoned to the NSS. On 20 November, former head of the parliamentary staff Ara Saghatelyan, ex-adviser to the President of Artsakh Tigran Abrahamyan, ex-MP Mihran Hakobyan, activist Narek Malyan, and almost all members of the Adekvad initiative were detained; Malyan and Hakobyan were released the next day. Mihran Hakobyan was charged with "organizing mass disorder" on 26 November.

== Analysis ==
Prior to the general strike Richard Giragosian, while Director of the Armenian Center for National and International Studies, stated that he does not expect a sharp change of power due to the rather small scale of the protests and the unpopularity of the opposition. However, he stressed that Pashinyan needs to restore peace and confidence in the coming weeks, which, will not be easy.

EurasiaNet editor Joshua Kucera stated that the Pashinyan government is under threat as many Armenians feel betrayed. "He has many political opponents, and they want to seize the moment to overthrow him."

== See also ==
- 2021 Armenian political crisis
- 2022 Armenian protests
- 2023 Armenian protests
