= Armenia Alliance =

Political alliance in Armenia

Armenia Alliance Հայաստան դաշինք
- Leader: Robert Kocharyan
- National Assembly Leader: Seyran Ohanyan
- Founders: Robert Kocharyan; Ishkhan Saghatelyan; Vahe Hakobyan
- Founded: 9 May 2021
- Headquarters: Yerevan, Armenia
- Ideology: Armenian nationalism Russophilia
- Political position: Centre-left
- Member parties: Armenian Revolutionary Federation; Forward; Reborn Armenia (former); One Armenia Party (former)
- Colours: Blue; Red
- Slogan: "Together We Can" (2026)
- National Assembly: 12 / 107

Website
- դաշինք.հայ

Armenia Alliance (Armenian: Հայաստան դաշինք, romanized: Hayastan dashink’, HD) is an Armenian political alliance. It was founded in 2021 and is currently led by former President of Armenia Robert Kocharyan. The party is pro-Russian and fully supports membership in the CSTO and the Eurasian Economic Union.

== History ==
During the 2020–2021 Armenian protests, Robert Kocharyan endorsed the Homeland Salvation Movement, a political alliance calling for the resignation of the Armenian Prime Minister Nikol Pashinyan. Kocharyan later announced he would be re-entering politics with the foundation of a new political alliance. The Armenia Alliance held its founding ceremony in Yerevan on 9 May 2021 and consisted the Armenian Revolutionary Federation, the Reborn Armenia party, and is led by Robert Kocharyan who remained non-partisan.

The alliance had confirmed that it would participate in the 2021 Armenian parliamentary elections. The One Armenia Party announced it would nominate a single candidate to participate in the elections as part of the Armenia Alliance.

Following the 2021 election, the alliance won 21.1% of the popular vote, gaining 29 seats in the National Assembly and becoming the official opposition. Robert Kocharyan, who headed the alliance's electoral list, declined to take his seat in the National Assembly. Seyran Ohanyan was elected to lead the alliance's faction in parliament.

On 4 July 2022, Arthur Ghazinian, leader of the One Armenia Party announced that he was renouncing his parliamentary seat from the Armenia Alliance faction.

On 29 November 2022, Reborn Armenia members of parliament decided to terminate their positions in the National Assembly.

Prior to the 2023 Yerevan City Council election, the Armenia Alliance and Robert Kocharyan endorsed the Mother Armenia Alliance and Andranik Tevanyan for Mayor of Yerevan. Tevanyan was a former member of parliament with the Armenia Alliance, but stepped down in order to run in the municipal election. Following the election, the Mother Armenia Alliance won 12 seats in the Yerevan City Council.

== Structure ==
The alliance is headed by Robert Kocharyan, the head of the pre-election headquarters is former Deputy Prime Minister of Armenia Armen Gevorgyan, and the official representative of the central pre-election headquarters is lawyer Aram Vardevanyan.

== Activities ==
On 9 May 2021, following the foundation of the alliance, Kocharyan led a rally in Freedom Square, Yerevan. During the rally, Kocharyan addressed his supporters.

== Leadership ==
- Robert Kocharyan, Second President of Armenia
- Ishkhan Saghatelyan, Representative of the Supreme Body of the Armenian Revolutionary Federation
- Vahe Hakobyan, Chairman of the Reborn Armenia Party

== Electoral record ==
=== Parliamentary elections ===
Election	Votes	%	Seats	+/–	Position	Government
2021	269,481	21.11	29 / 107	▲29	▲2nd	Opposition
2026	138,888	9.89	12 / 105	▼17	▼3rd	Opposition

== See also ==
- Programs of political parties in Armenia
