= Extra-parliamentary opposition =

An extra-parliamentary opposition, also referred to as simply extra-parliamentary or extraparliamentary, is a political movement opposed to a ruling government or political party that chooses not to engage in elections. Many social movements could be categorized as an extra-parliamentary opposition.

== Europe ==
=== Germany ===
- Außerparlamentarische Opposition

=== Italy ===
- Lotta Continua

=== Sweden ===
- Allt åt Alla
