= Mineral industry of Armenia =

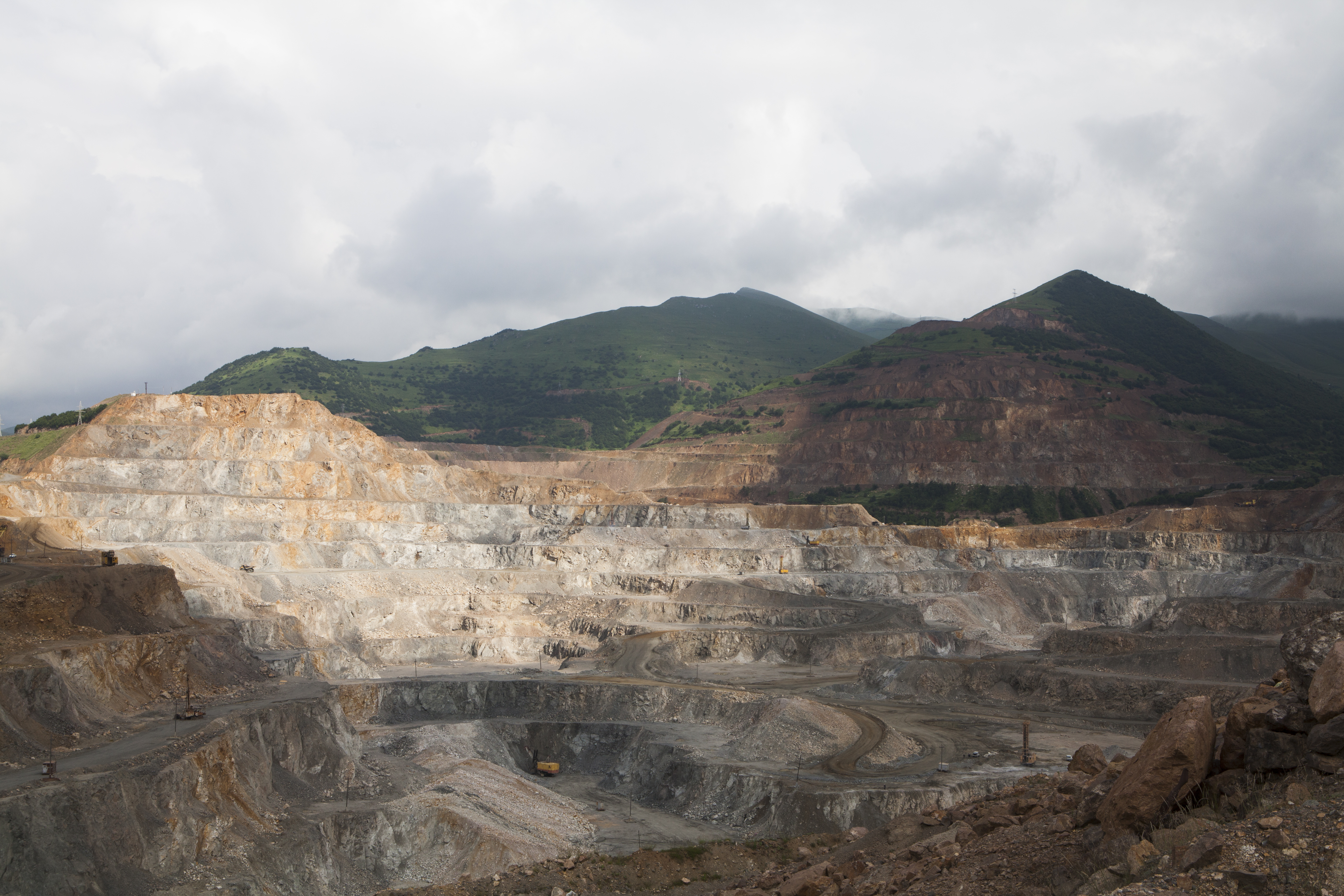
Armenia's largest mine, the Kajaran copper-molybdenum open-pit mine in southern Armenia is operated by the Zangezur Copper and Molybdenum Combine, and until 2018, was 75% owned by the German CRONIMET company

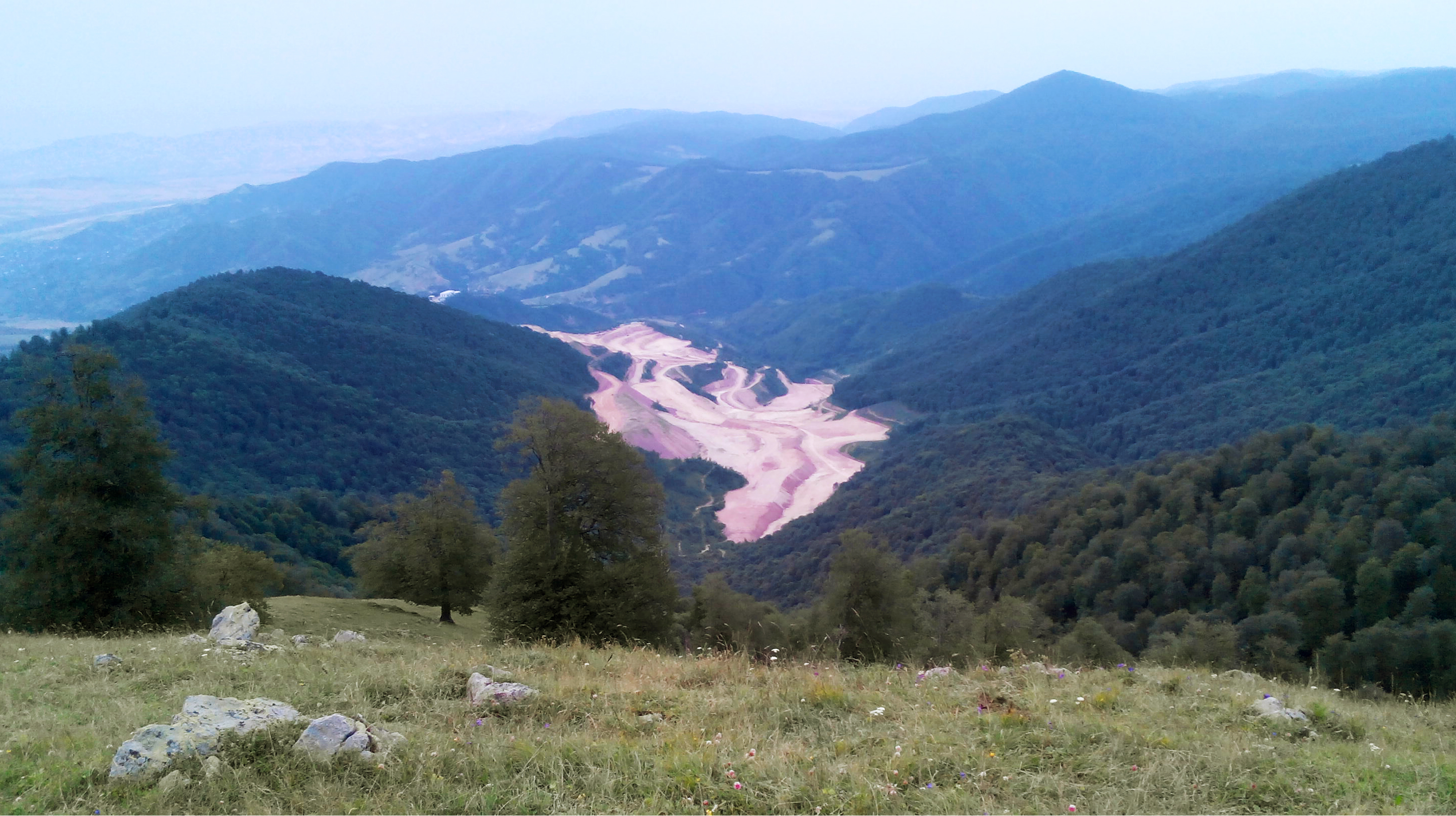
The Teghut Mine (opened in December 2014) contains a copper and molybdenum deposit valued at over US$15 billion and has destroyed over 350 acres of Armenia's little-remaining forested land. The operator of the mine, Vallex Group, will pay only about 10% of revenues in taxes.

The mineral industry is one of the main sectors of the Armenian economy and in 2017 accounted for 30.1% of its exports.

Armenia is a major producer of molybdenum, which is used in some high-quality forms of steel, and other alloys. The Zangezur copper-molybdenum complex possesses large molybdenum reserves that are concentrated in the Kajaran deposit. Besides molybdenum, Armenia has significant deposits of copper and gold; Smaller deposits of lead, silver, and zinc; and deposits of industrial minerals, including basalt, diatomite, granite, gypsum, limestone, and perlite.

== Mines ==
External images
- Map of mines and tailings in Armenia by American University of Armenia
- Metal mines (2010)
- Stone mines (2010)
- Granular solid (sand like) mines (2010)
- Diverse use mines (2010)

According to the Armenian Development Agency, Armenia has more than 670 mines of construction and aggregate minerals, including 30 base metal and precious metal mines. Among these mines, about 400 mines, including 22 base metal, non-ferrous metal and precious metal mines are currently being exploited.

Among the base metal and precious metal deposits, there are 7 copper-molybdenum mines, 3 copper mines, 13 gold and gold-polymetallic mines, 2 polymetallic mines and 2 iron ore mines.

In addition to those mines registered in the state inventory of mineral resources, there are an additional 115 deposits of various deposits that have been discovered.

Metallic mineral deposits
Name	Metals mined	Province	Nearest town	GPS coordinates	Ore processing	Tailing dam(s)	Company exploiting mine
Mghart Mine	Gold	Lori	Mghart village	40.994418°N 44.570902°E; Exploratory work and ore extraction reported	On-site enrichment plant	40.989309°N 44.556923°E; 3 tailing dams on site	MultiGroup (owned by Gagik Tsarukyan, via Mghart Gold Enrichment Plant)
Shamlugh Mine	Copper	Lori	Shamlugh	41.165272°N 44.719861°E			Metal Prince Ltd.
Armanis	Gold, Copper, Zinc, Lead	Lori	Armanis village	41.007273°N 44.308790°E (approximate)			Global Metals (via Sagamar CJSC), formerly Metal Prince Ltd.
Teghut Mine	Copper, Molybdenum	Lori	Teghut village	41.105581°N 44.837086°E	On-site (proposed)	On-site (proposed)	Disputed between insolvent Vallex Group (via Teghout CJSC) and VTB Bank. Operations suspended as of Feb 2019.
Akhtala	Copper	Lori	Akhtala	41.157122°N 44.784159°E	On-site	41.150464°N 44.765126°E adjacent to Akhtala monastery	Metal Prince Ltd.
Akhtala	Barite	Lori	Akhtala				
Alaverdi	Copper	Lori	Alaverdi	41.123939°N 44.645418°E			Vallex Group (via Armenian Copper Programme CJSC)
Tandzut	Gold oxide	Lori					Vallex Group (via Armenian Copper Programme CJSC)
Tukhmanuk	Gold, Silver	Aragatsotn	Melikgyugh	40.655165°N 44.382853°E (according to company map)			Global Gold Corporation
Meghradzor	Gold	Kotayk					GeoProMining
Abovyan	Iron (Magnetite)	Kotayk					Bounty Resources Armenia (35% owned by the Chinese company Fortune Oil)
Hrazdan	Iron	Kotayk					Bounty Resources Armenia (35% owned by the Chinese company Fortune Oil)
Hankavan	Copper, Molybdenum	Kotayk	Hankavan	Exploratory work underway			GeoProMining (via Golden Ore, LLC) (license dispute with Global Gold Corporation)
Tezhasar	Nepheline syenite	Kotayk	Meghradzor				Alumina Corporation LLC
Meghradzor (Lusajur section)	Gold	Kotayk					Paramount Gold Mining Ltd. (owned by RA National Assembly President Hovik Abrahamyan and MO Tigran Arzakantsyan)
Getik	Gold, Silver, Uranium	Gegharkunik	Getik, Gegharkunik	Exploratory work in progress			Global Gold Corporation
Sotk Mine	Gold	Gegharkunik	Sotk	40.235663°N 45.971034°E	Off-site at Ararat Gold Recovery Company in Ararat town 40.235663°N 44.747978°E	39.796331°N 44.726260°E	GeoProMining (via GPM Gold)
Azatek	Gold, polymetallic	Vayots Dzor	Vayk				Azatek Gold Ltd. Ownership: 74% owned by Anglo-African Minerals plc; 26% by Alrosa)
Gladzor	Copper, Lead, Zinc	Vayots Dzor		Exploratory work underway			GeoProMining
Sofi Bina	Gold	Vayots Dzor					
Amulsar Mine	Gold	Vayots Dzor	Jermuk	39.748776°N 45.713275°E	On-site (Proposed)	On-site (Proposed)	Lydian Armenia (100% owned by Lydian International Limited which is registered on the island of Jersey in the Channel Islands)
Kajaran Mine	Copper, Molybdenum	Syunik	Qajaran	39.145131°N 46.137979°E	On-site at 39.152423°N 46.149748°E		Zangezur Copper Molybdenum Combine CJSC; ZCMC CSJS ownership: 60% CRONIMET Mining AG; 15% The Plant of Pure Iron” OJSC (owned by CRONIMET); 12.5% by Armenian Molybdenum Production Ltd., 12.5% by Zangezour Mining Ltd)
Shahumyan	Gold, Copper, Zinc, Lead, Silver	Syunik	Shahumyan village	39.224014°N 46.426121°E			Dundee Precious Metals Inc. (via Deno Gold Mining Company)
Agarak Mine	Copper, Molybdenum	Syunik	Agarak town	38.919906°N 46.185664°E	near Agarak at 38.887127°N 46.192979°E	Multiple: 38.880062°N 46.203809°E; 38.867663°N 46.215830°E; 38.876489°N 46.234571°E	GeoProMining (since 2007, via Agarak Copper-Molybdenum Mine Complex)
Kapan	Copper, Molybdenum	Syunik	39.232566°N 46.396825°E		39.191085°N 46.424537°E		“Kapan Mining and Processing Enterprise” cjsc (owned by Chaarat Gold Holdings Ltd.)
Lichqvaz-Tey	Gold, Copper, Silver	Syunik	Meghri				Global Metals (since December 2010, via LV Gold Mining) (formerly Tamaya Resources (formerly Iberian Resources))
Dastakert	Copper, Molybdenum	Syunik	Dastakert village	39.352011°N 46.031378°E			Global Metals (via Molibdeny Ashkharh LLC)
Lichq	Copper	Syunik					
Terterasar	Gold	Syunik	Meghri				Tamaya Resources (since 2005, via Iberian Resources via Sipan-1)
Hankasar	Copper, Molybdenum	Syunik	Geghi village	39.228882°N 46.150311°E	On-site	On-site	Ler-Ex Ltd. (Owned by Governor of the Syunik Region Suren Khachatryan)
Aygedzor	Gold, Copper, Molybdenum	Syunik	Meghri				Tamaya Resources (since 2005, via Iberian Resources via Sipan-1)
Bardzradir (Mazra)	Gold	Syunik	Tsav, Armenia	Exploration work underway (as of June 2012)			Opulent Trading Solutions
Svarants	Iron	Syunik	Svarants village				Bounty Resources Armenia (35% owned by the Chinese company Fortune Oil)
Marjan	Gold, Silver	Syunik	Arevis	Exploration work underway 39.383713°N 45.850937°E			Global Gold Corporation
Drmbon Mine	Gold, Copper	Martakert Province, Nagorno-Karabakh Republic	Drmbon village	40.138733°N 46.597586°E	On-site at 40.144179°N 46.596419°E	Multiple: 40.143615°N 46.587434°E; 40.147963°N 46.599290°E	Vallex Group (via Base Metals CJSC)
Kashen	Copper	Martakert Province, Nagorno-Karabakh Republic	near the villages of Vardadzor, Tchankatagh, and Tzaghkashen)	40.154353°N 46.781003°E		On-site (proposed)	Vallex Group (via Base Metals CJSC)

== Production ==
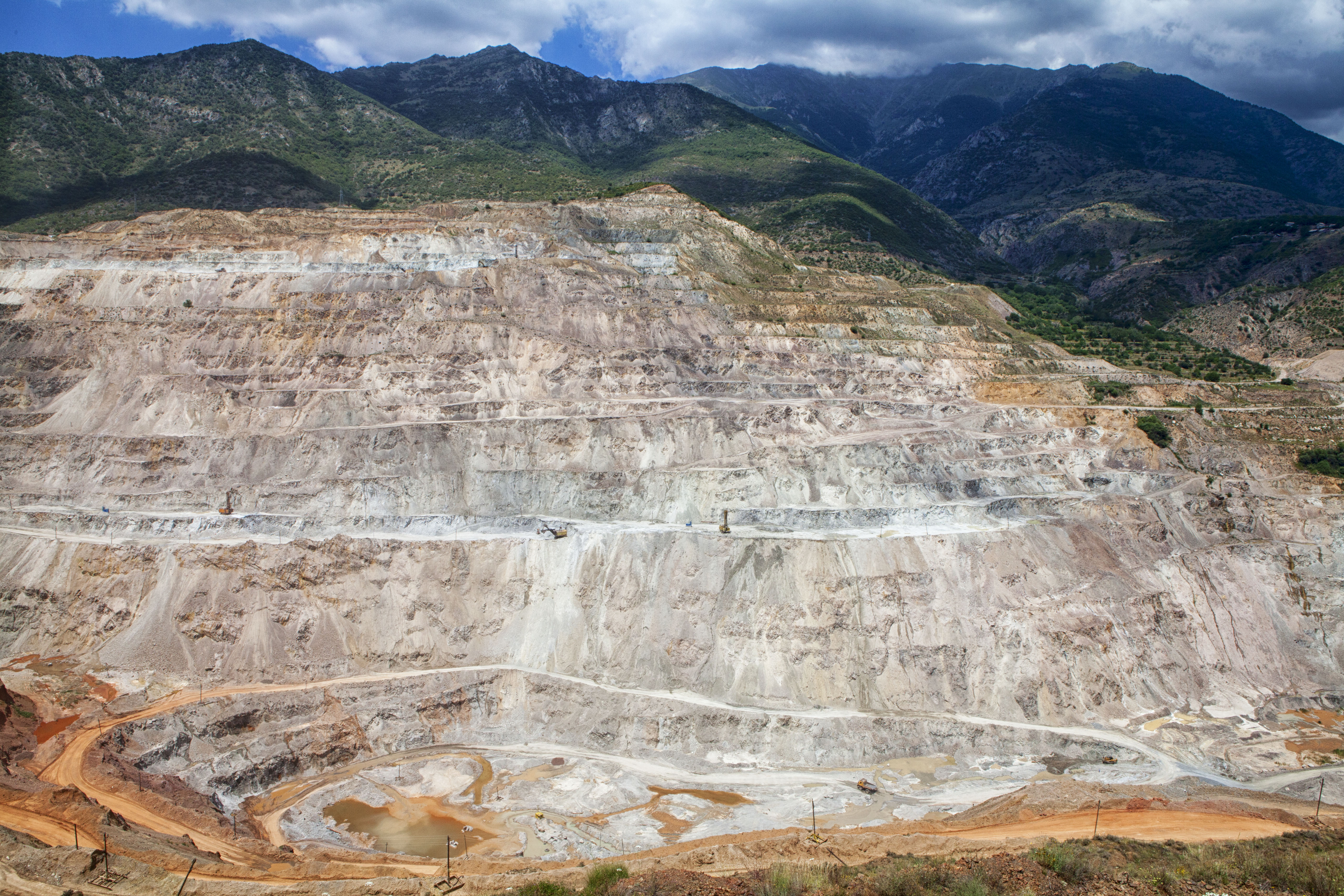
The open-pit Agarak copper mine in the town of Agarak in the southern Syunik province

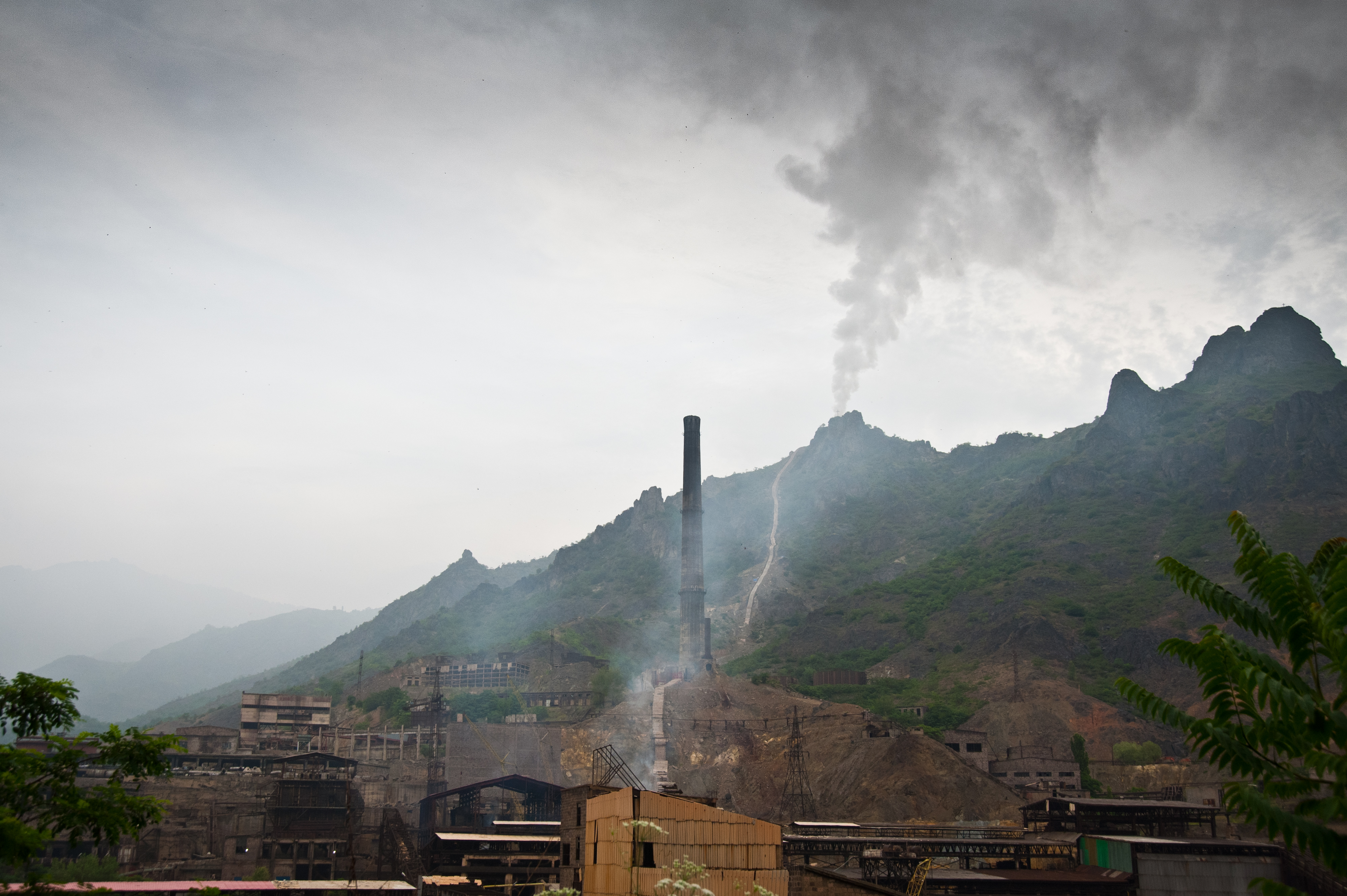
The copper smelter at Alaverdi in Armenia's northern Lori province

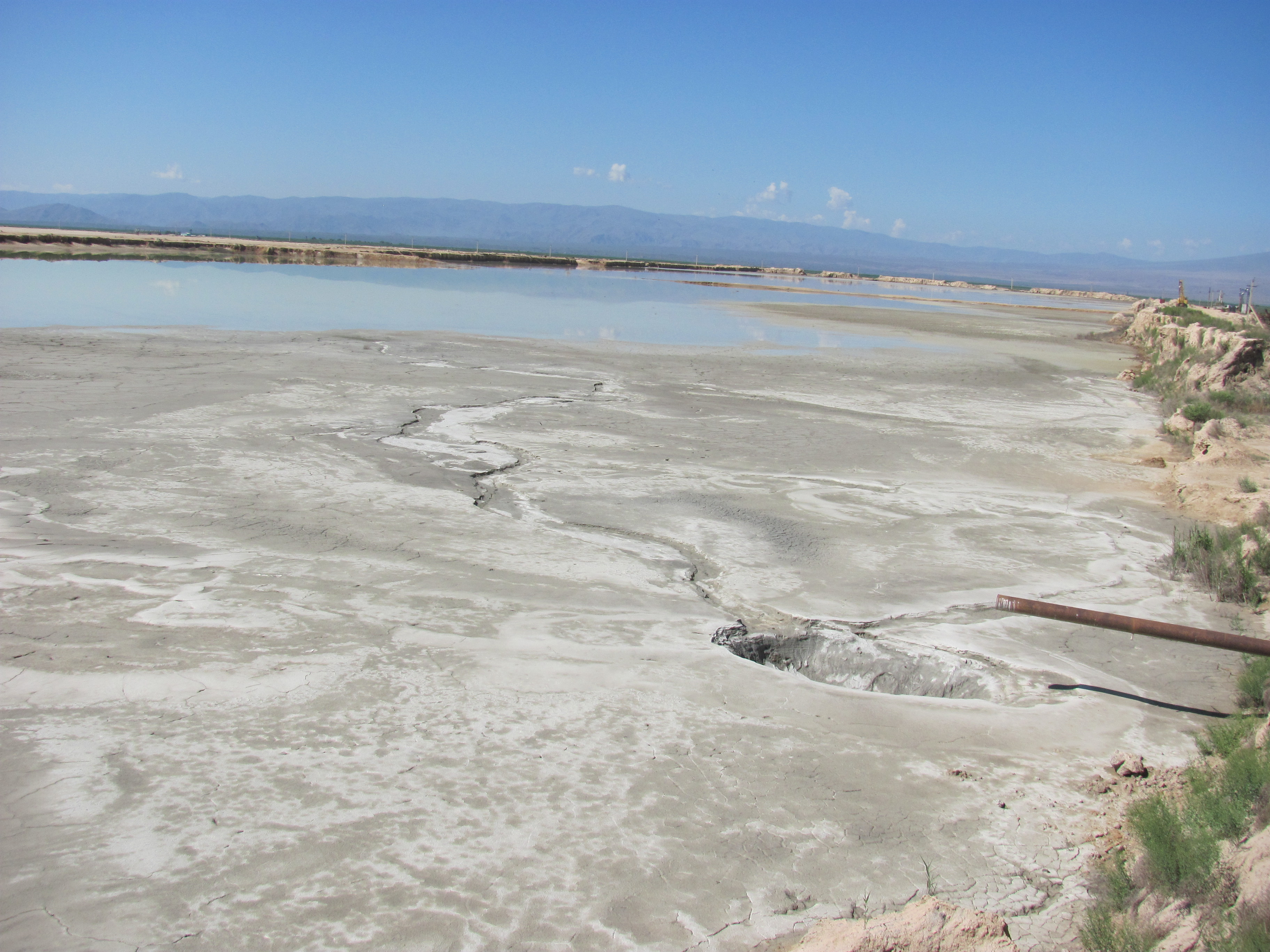
A general view of the massive toxic tailing dump of the Ararat gold processing facility in the town of Ararat where gold from the Sotq mine is extracted

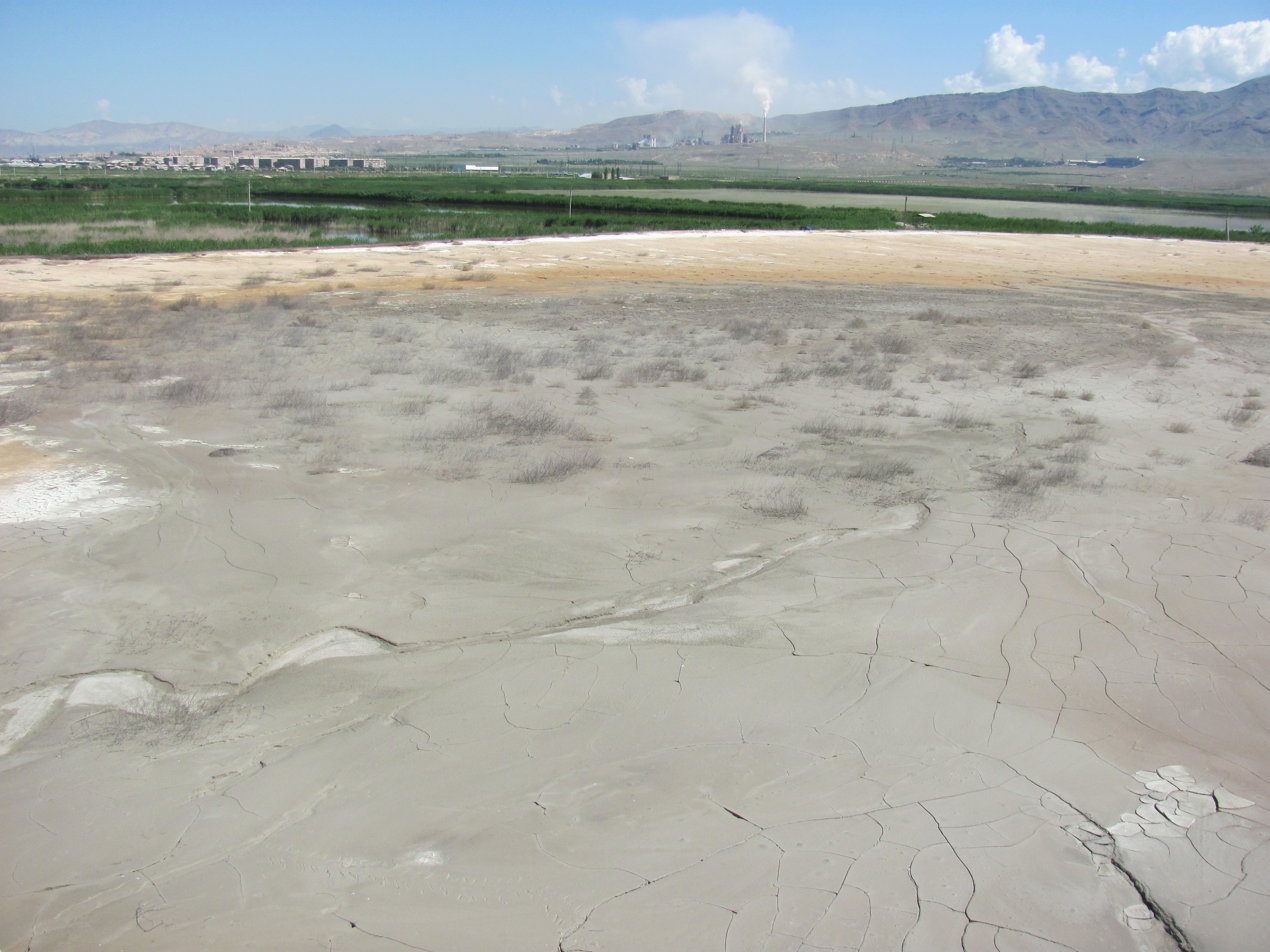
Ararat tailing dump with the town of Ararat in the background

In 2017, mining industry output grew by 14.2% to 172 billion AMD at current prices and contribute to 3.1% of Armenia's GDP.

In spite of the global economic crisis of 2008, mining production and revenues grew significantly in 2009 due to a rise in global prices of copper, gold, and other base metals.

In 2005, seventeen mining and metallurgical enterprises were in operation; the largest enterprises mined copper and molybdenum ore or extracted gold from tailings. The country also produces aluminum foil based on raw materials imported from Russia and has a diamond cutting industry using imported raw materials. The country has almost no domestic fuel production and relies on the Armenian Nuclear Power Plant for electric power, as well as hydroelectric plants. Armenia imports fuel for its nuclear powerplant and natural gas from Russia.

The value of mineral production in 2005 totaled $180 million or about 5% of the gross domestic product(GDP). Mining and nonferrous metallurgy accounted for 55% of the value of industrial production. The mineral sector accounted for 11% of the value of the country's capital stock.

In 2005, in the aggregate, the volume of metallic ores mined decreased although nonmetallic ore production increased. The volume of output in both the ferrous and nonferrous metallurgical sectors increased compared with output in 2004. The output volume of individual mineral commodities with respect to output in 2004 varied by commodity.

== Foreign Trade ==
In 2017, mineral product (without precious metals and stones) exports grew by 46.9% and run at US$692 million, which comprised 30.1% of all exports.

In terms of value, cut diamonds are the country's leading mineral export followed by copper and ores and slags, of which molybdenum ores and concentrates had the most value. The country reported significant exports of iron and steel, which were either transshipments or scrap as the county had no domestic steel industry.

== Outlook ==
Further development of the country's mineral production sector is projected as additional funds become available for mineral sector development. Mineral production has been increasing (except for in the diamond-cutting industry) and the country is making a particular effort to attract investment in its mining sector. Molybdenum output is expected to increase as a result of a successful privatization program that involved a $200 million investment that has enabled the Zangezur copper-molybdenum complex to begin reequipping its mining and processing operations in 2005. The goal is to increase the ore-processing capacity at the Kadzharan deposit by 50% to between 12.5 and 13 million metric tons per year (Mt/yr) of ore by 2008. The Armenian Copper Program (ACP) is also in the process of having the large Teghout copper-molybdenum deposit reevaluated and, if it proves feasible for development, the deposit will be second only to the Kadzharan deposit in the size of its copper and molybdenum reserves. International companies are investing in developing gold deposits in Armenia, including Ararat Gold Recovery Company (a 100% subsidiary of Sterlite Ltd. of Canada) and United States–based Global Gold Corp. Production of aluminum foil is also expected to increase with the restarting of the Armenal plant.

In February 2011, a Chinese delegation of the Fortune Oil company said the company plans to invest upwards of $500 million in Armenia's mining industry in two stages.

== Corruption ==
In 2017, Transparency International included the case of Armenia in its research on corruption in mining industry in several countries.

While some mines or their operating licenses are directly owned by Armenian ministers of parliament through a series of holding companies, others are sold to foreign entities by the same or other MPs. In 2010, Paramount Gold Mining, owned by the National Assembly President Hovik Abrahamyan and MP Tigran Arzakantsyan, was awarded a 25-year operating license for the southern portion of the Meghradzor gold mine in the Kotayk Province. According to Hetq, MP Tigran Arzakantsyan, who has not been seen in parliament for quite a while, is now in Europe seeking out buyers for the mine. Hovik Abrahamyan was also involved in the sale of the Hankavan gold mine. He also owns an exploratory license for the copper and molybdenum mine in the Vayots Dzor village of Yelpin. The license went to Argamik Ltd., a company registered in the village of Mkhchyan. The company is owned by Argam Abrahamyan, Hovik's son.

In January 2011, the Chinese Fortune Oil Company based in Hong Kong purchased 35% of Bounty Resources Armenia, owner and operator of three iron ore mines in Armenia. Word of the sale spread through the Internet, with the Armenian government providing no details. According to the website of the London Stock Exchange, the sale amounted to $24 million. According to Hetq Investigative Journalism, the sale was a private one by Armenian ministers of parliament Vardan Ayvazyan and Tigran Arzakantsyan who through a series of transactions and holding companies have attempted to hide who the real owners of the companies are and to circumvent government scrutiny.

== Environmental impact ==
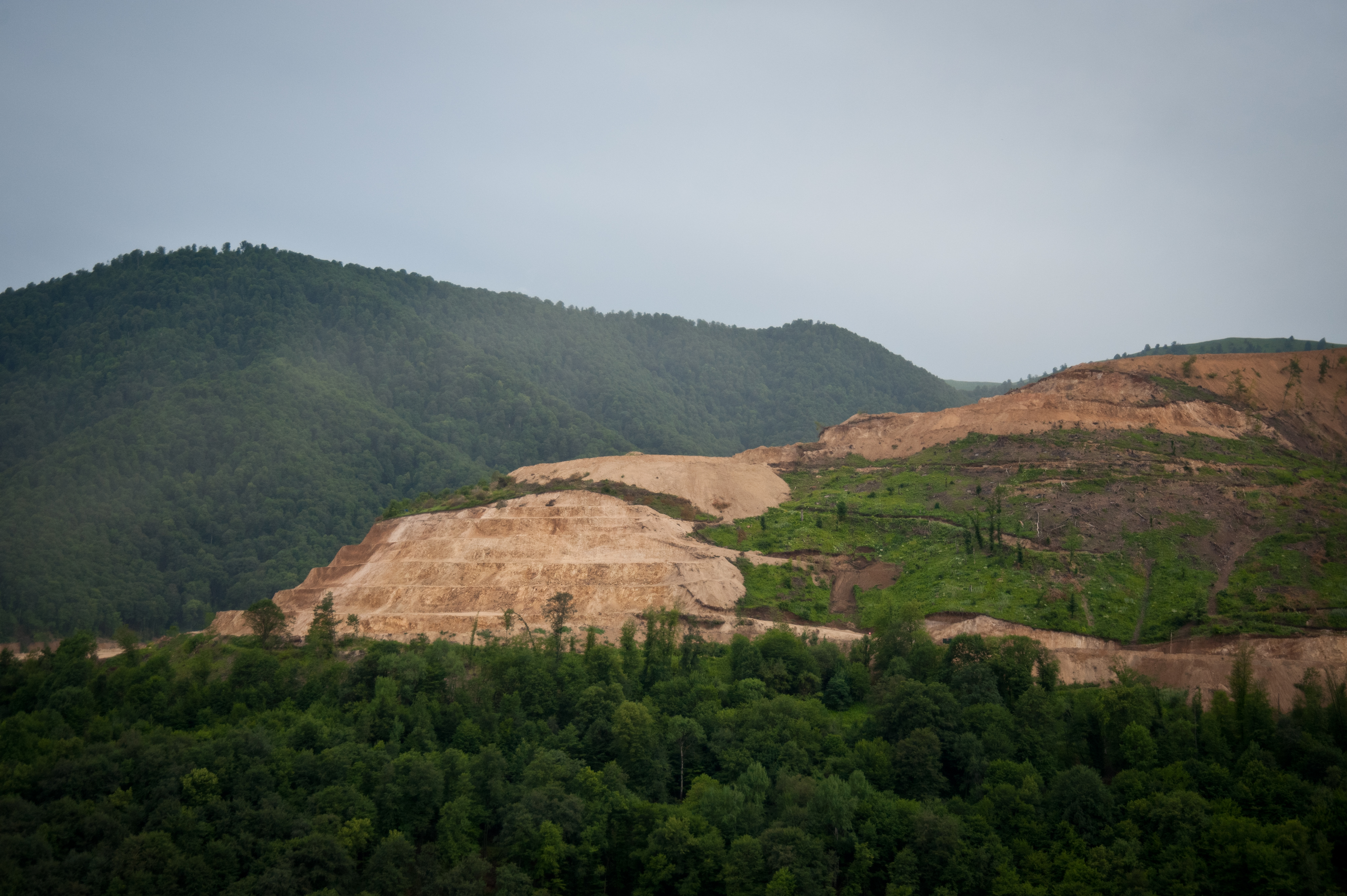
Destruction of the old-growth forest to make way for the open-pit copper and molybdenum mine at Teghut

According to a study by the Republic of Armenia's RA National Academy of Sciences’ Center for Ecological-Noosphere Studies, mining in Armenia has been disastrous for Armenia in terms of public health and the environment. Mining operators have failed to neutralize dangerous contaminants which have been absorbed by the ground. The pollutants then pass from the ground to agricultural produce and then to humans. 57% of Yerevan's population may be living in contaminated conditions due to ground pollution. Furthermore, the country's rural fields are being irrigated with water flowing from contaminated sources due to mining operations. Also, according to the study, all types of farm produce from the towns of Kapan, Kajaran, Alaverdi, and Akhtala (all of which have significant mining operations) are laden with heavy metals, including mercury arsenic and cadmium.
