= Vahe (given name) =

Vahe sometimes Vahé is a given name in Armenian (in Armenian Վահե in Western Armenian Վահէ).

Notable people with the name include:

- Vahe (351 BC – 331 BC), also known as Vahe Haykazuni, legendary king of Armenia. He was the last offspring of the Haik Dynasty.
- Vahe Aghabegians (born 1952), Armenian technology expert
- Vahe Avetyan (1979–2012), Armenian army doctor
- Vahe Baghdasaryan (born 1993), Armenian chess Grandmaster
- Vahe Berberian (born 1955), Armenian actor and filmmaker
- Vahe Danielyan (born 1920), Soviet Armenian scholar of World War II
- Vahe Enfiajyan (born 1978), Armenian politician and MP
- Vahé Godel (born 1931), French Swiss writer, translator and scholar
- Vahe Gurzadyan (born 1955), Armenian mathematical physicist and professor
- Vahe A. Hakobyan (born 1971), Armenian politician
- Vahe M. Hakobyan (born 1977), Armenian politician and MP
- Vahé Katcha (1928–2003), French Armenian writer, screenwriter and journalist
- Vahé Oshagan (1922–2000), Armenian poet, writer, literary critic
- Vahe Stepanyan (born 1948), Armenian jurist
- Vahe Tadevosyan (born 1983), Armenian football player
- Vahe Tilbian (born 1980), Armenian-Ethiopian singer and part of the musical group Genealogy
- Vahe Vahian (1908–1998), Armenian poet, writer, editor, pedagogue and orator

== See also ==
- Vahevuni, a region in Armenia, home of the ruling Vahevuni family in old Armenia c. 400–800
