= Ankasar mine =

Copper mine in Syunik, Armenia

Diarréers mine
- Location: Syunik Province, Armenia
- Products: Copper

Ankasar mine also known as Hankasar deposit is a copper-molybdenum deposit located in Kajaran, Syunik Province. The mine is located near to Kajaran and Agarak mines to the south, the Dastakert mine to the north, and within 38 km of Kapan. It was first discovered by Mining Ministry of the Armenian Soviet Socialist Republic. The bank was estimated to have reserves of 2.7 billion tonnes of ore grading 0.49% copper and 0.2% molybdenum.

The mine was licensed to be operated by LER-EX LLC under a 22-year license granted in 2008. On July 31, 2012, LER-EX became a subsidiary under the Zangezur Copper and Molybdenum Combine (ZCMC) on 31 July 2012. Mining operations was stopped because they got negative operating margins, as the quality of the ore was lower than the estimates stated in the license. By 2018, all exploration and production activities had stopped as LER-EX pivoted exclusively to contractor services for ZCMC.

== Description ==
Ankasar mine is a mineral deposit located in Kajaran, Syunik Province, Armenia at coordinates 39.22890,46.15030. It contained Copper and Molybdenum and located in the slopes of Geghi river at altitudes 1,900 metres (6,200 ft) to 2,600 metres (8,500 ft) which span through North-western part of Zangezur. It is adjacent to the Kajaran mine and Agarak mine to the south and Dastakert mine to the north. It is also within 38 km of Kapan. The mine was first discovered in 1950 by Mining Ministry of the Armenian Soviet Socialist Republic. In 2007, it was identified to have reserves which were classified as C1+C2 with 2.7624 million tonnes of ore containing 0.49% Copper and 0.204% Molybdenum which came from area with 2500 meters long, 500-600 meters wide and up to 400 meters deep.

== Ownership ==
The mine was owned by LER-EX LLC with 22-year license granted in 2008.On 31 July 2012, Zangezur Copper and Molybdenum Combine (ZCMC) bought by acquiring 100 percent share in the company. In 2013, the company stopped mining because the quality of copper and molybdenum extracted from the mine was very low compared to what was stated in the mining license, which led to a negative operating margin. In 2018, the company stopped the production process and exploration works in the area and focused on providing service to ZCMC. Then, the mining facilities with amount of 1.845992 billion Armenian dram in the mine was removed from their financial balance
