= Reborn Armenia =

Reborn Armenia Վերածնվող Հայաստան
- Leader: Vahe Hakobyan
- Founded: 2021
- Headquarters: Yerevan
- Ideology: Social capitalism Armenian nationalism Syunik regionalism
- National affiliation: Armenia Alliance
- Slogan: "Security, Justice and Labor"
- National Assembly: 0 / 107

Website
- vhk.am

Reborn Armenia (Armenian: Վերածնվող Հայաստան, romanized: Veratsnvogh Hayastan), also translated as Resurgent Armenia and Reviving Armenia, is an Armenian political party. It was founded on 20 March 2021 and until 07 November 2024 was led by Vahe A. Hakobyan.

== History ==
The party was established in 2021. Its chairman is Vahe Alberti Hakobyan. Hakobyan previously served as governor of the Syunik Province of Armenia (not to be confused with Vahe M. Hakobyan, another former governor of Syunik). Several party members, including Vahe Hakobyan, formerly belonged to the Republican Party of Armenia. The party has also stated that they would cooperate with other political parties in the country, but that they would refuse to work with the Sasna Tsrer Pan-Armenian Party.

During the 2020–2021 Armenian protests, the party called for Prime Minister Nikol Pashinyan to resign. On 7 May 2021, the party confirmed it would participate in the 2021 Armenian parliamentary elections as part of a political alliance with the Armenian Revolutionary Federation. The alliance was named Armenia Alliance and is led by the second President of Armenia, Robert Kocharyan. Following the election, the alliance won 21% of the popular vote and gained 29 seats in the National Assembly, becoming the official opposition.

On 29 November 2022, Reborn Armenia members of parliament decided to terminate their positions in the National Assembly.

== Ideology ==
The party supports full political and civil equality for all citizens, regardless of religious, racial or sexual differences, and supports freedom of choice of religion, conscience, language, education, and culture. The party supports increased opportunities for youth, maintaining a strong social security system for the elderly, increasing military funding, and encourages repatriation from the Armenian Diaspora. In terms of economics, the party supports the development of a mixed economy by blending elements of a capitalist market economy with elements of a planned economy. The party also calls on further investment in health care and education, fighting corruption, and strengthening Armenia's role in the Caucasus region.

== Electoral record ==
=== Parliamentary elections ===
Election	Leader	Votes	%	Seats	+/–	Position	Government
2021 (Note: Run within Armenia Alliance)	Vahe Hakobyan	269,481	21.11	6 / 107	▲6	▲2nd	Opposition

== See also ==
- Programs of political parties in Armenia
