= List of cities and towns in Armenia =

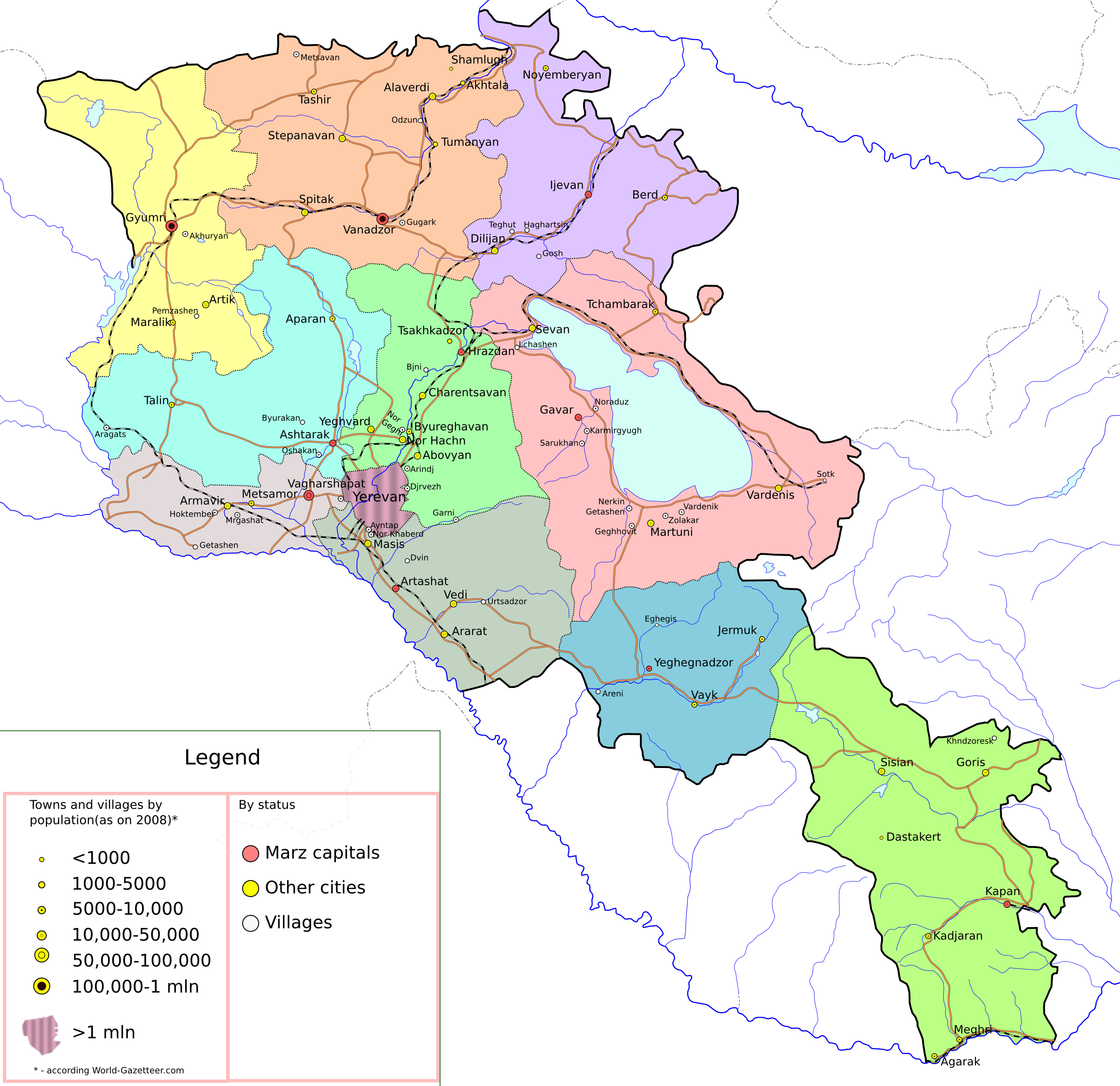
Map of the cities in Armenia (does not reflect the 2017 reforms).

This is a list of cities and towns in Armenia ordered by population by the Statistical Committee of Armenia (ArmStat). Armenia has 46 municipalities designated as urban communities (Armenian: քաղաքային համայնքներ k’aghak’ayin hamaynk’ner) as of 2017. However, a city/town (քաղաք, k’aghak’ ) in Armenia is not defined based on the size of its population. The other 457 municipalities in Armenia are considered rural communities (գյուղական համայնքներ, gyughakan hamaynk’ner). Two-thirds of the population are now urbanized. Statistically, 63.6% of Armenians live in urban areas as compared to 36.4% in rural, as of 2017.

Yerevan, Gyumri, and Vanadzor are the three largest urban settlements of the republic, currently having populations of more than 50,000. They were considered as "cities of republican subordination" (հանրապետական ենթակայության քաղաքներ) during the Soviet period. The rest of the towns have populations less than 50,000.

Agarak, Dastakert and Shamlugh were downgraded from towns to villages as a result of the administrative reforms took place during 2017. As such they are no longer included in the list below.

== List ==
Rank	City (Armenian name)	Province	Population (2001 census)	Population (2011 census)	Population (2024 statistics)	Change (2011–2024)
1	Yerevan (Երեւան)	—	1,103,488	1,060,138	1,136,300	+7.18%
2	Gyumri (Գյումրի)	Shirak	150,917	121,976	114,800	−5.88%
3	Vanadzor (Վանաձոր)	Lori	107,394	86,199	78,400	−9.05%
4	Abovyan (Աբովյան)	Kotayk	44,569	43,495	50,600	+16.34%
5	Vagharshapat (Վաղարշապատ) (Note: Also widely known as Ejmiatsin (Էջմիածին))	Armavir	56,388	46,540	44,837	−3.66%
6	Hrazdan (Հրազդան)	Kotayk	52,808	41,875	49,400	+17.97%
7	Kapan (Կապան)	Syunik	45,711	43,190	33,100	−23.36%
8	Armavir (Արմավիր)	Armavir	32,034	29,319	29,800	+1.64%
9	Charentsavan (Չարենցավան)	Kotayk	25,039	20,363	23,900	+17.37%
10	Masis (Մասիս)	Ararat	21,376	20,215	25,300	+25.15%
11	Artashat (Արտաշատ)	Ararat	25,066	22,269	24,600	+10.47%
12	Sevan (Սևան)	Gegharkunik	21,422	19,229	19,900	+3.49%
13	Ijevan (Իջևան)	Tavush	20,223	21,081	19,700	−6.55%
14	Gavar (Գավառ)	Gegharkunik	26,621	20,765	19,000	−8.50%
15	Artik (Արթիկ)	Shirak	17,561	19,534	18,100	−7.34%
16	Goris (Գորիս)	Syunik	23,261	20,591	21,800	+5.87%
17	Ararat (Արարատ)	Ararat	20,480	20,235	17,900	−11.54%
18	Dilijan (Դիլիջան)	Tavush	16,202	17,712	16,400	−7.41%
19	Ashtarak (Աշտարակ)	Aragatsotn	20,636	18,834	18,700	−0.71%
20	Sisian (Սիսիան)	Syunik	16,843	14,894	13,300	−10.70%
21	Spitak (Սպիտակ)	Lori	14,984	12,881	13,600	+5.58%
22	Vardenis (Վարդենիս)	Gegharkunik	12,753	12,685	12,400	−2.25%
23	Yeghvard (Եղվարդ)	Kotayk	11,627	11,672	13,400	+14.80%
24	Alaverdi (Ալավերդի)	Lori	16,641	13,343	12,300	−7.82%
25	Stepanavan (Ստեփանավան)	Lori	16,299	13,086	12,200	−6.77%
26	Martuni (Մարտունի)	Gegharkunik	11,756	12,894	12,300	−4.61%
27	Vedi (Վեդի)	Ararat	12,963	11,384	12,700	+11.56%
28	Byureghavan (Բյուրեղավան)	Kotayk	8,152	9,513	11,800	+24.04%
29	Nor Hachn (Նոր Հաճն)	Kotayk	10,168	9,307	10,700	+14.97%
30	Metsamor (Մեծամոր)	Armavir	9,870	9,191	10,100	+9.89%
31	Tashir (Տաշիր)	Lori	9,538	7,773	8,000	+2.92%
32	Yeghegnadzor (Եղեգնաձոր)	Vayots Dzor	8,187	7,944	7,400	−6.85%
33	Berd (Բերդ)	Tavush	8,810	7,957	6,900	−13.28%
34	Kajaran (Քաջարան)	Syunik	8,439	7,163	6,600	−7.86%
35	Aparan (Ապարան)	Aragatsotn	6,614	6,451	6,400	−0.79%
36	Chambarak (Ճամբարակ)	Gegharkunik	6,405	5,850	5,600	−4.27%
37	Vayk (Վայք)	Vayots Dzor	6,024	5,877	5,600	−4.71%
38	Maralik (Մարալիկ)	Shirak	5,782	5,398	5,400	+0.04%
39	Noyemberyan (Նոյեմբերյան)	Tavush	5,486	5,310	4,700	−11.49%
40	Meghri (Մեղրի)	Syunik	4,805	4,580	4,000	−12.66%
41	Jermuk (Ջերմուկ)	Vayots Dzor	5,394	4,628	4,100	−11.41%
42	Talin (Թալին)	Aragatsotn	5,614	5,310	4,700	−11.49%
43	Akhtala (Ախթալա)	Lori	2,435	2,092	2,400	+14.72%
44	Ayrum (Այրում)	Tavush	2,351	2,126	1,900	−10.63%
45	Tumanyan (Թումանյան)	Lori	1,909	1,710	1,500	−12.28%
46	Tsaghkadzor (Ծաղկաձոր)	Kotayk	1,618	1,256	1,200	−4.46%

Source: 2001 census; 2011 census; 2022 census; 2024 statistics

== See also ==
- List of settlements in Armenia
- List of cities and towns in Artsakh
