= Voghji =

Voghji may refer to:

- Voghji, Shirak, Armenia
- Voghji, Syunik, Armenia
- Voghji (river), a river of Armenia and Azerbaijan
