= Artak Davtyan =

Artak Davtyan may refer to:

- Artak Davtyan (general)
- Artak Davtyan (politician)
