= Marine Petrossian =

Armenian poet, essayist and columnist

Marine Petrossian Մարինե Պետրոսյան
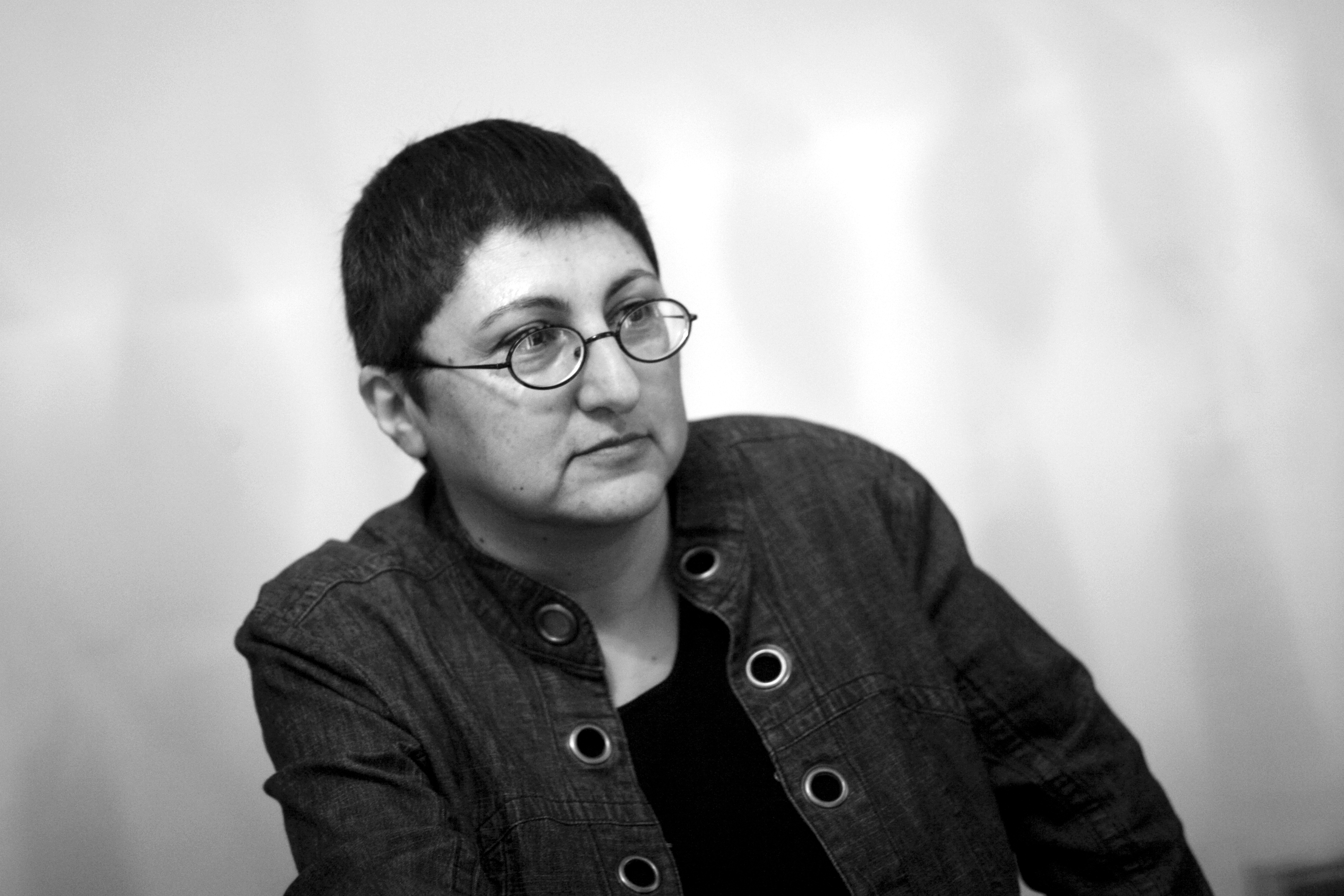
- Born: 16 August 1960 (age 66); Yerevan, Armenia
- Occupations: Poet; essayist; columnist
- Writing career
- Language: Armenian
- Website: marinepetrossian.com

Marine Petrossian (written also as Mariné Petrossian, Armenian: Մարինե Պետրոսյան; born 16 August 1960) is an Armenian poet, essayist and columnist.

== Poet ==
The start of Marine Petrossian’s literary career coincided with the ending of the Soviet Union. Her first book was published in Yerevan in 1993, just two years after Armenia, formerly Soviet Republic, became independent.

The poems of this volume were translated into French by Vahe Godel and in 1995 French Editions Comp’Act published J’apporterai des pierres by Petrossian. Encouraged by success of the book (a favorable review, among others, was published in Le Monde) Editions Comp’Act soon published the second book of Marine Petrossian, Erevan, 2003.

Since then, Petrossian has published another four volumes of poetry in Armenia.

In 2015, Argentinian publisher Audisea published Disparó el arma by Petrossian, comprising poems translated into Spanish by Alice Ter-Ghevondian. The presentation of the book took place at the National Library of Argentina and well-known newspaper Página/12 invited Petrossian to interview.

Petrossian has been writer-in-residence at Djerassi Artists Residency, Woodside, California, as Artist Laureate of UNESCO-Aschberg bursaries (2005); at Q21, MuseumsQuartier Vienna (2013); as well as at Omi International Arts Center, New York City (2015).

Petrossian self-translates her poetry into English. Some of her self-translations can be found in Transcript – Europe's online review of international writing, as well as in Deviation, Anthology of Contemporary Armenian Literature ISBN 978-99941-2-188-5

== Essayist ==
Petrossian’s essay "Antipoetry, or When the Poet Does Not Seek an Alibi" has aroused intense discussions in Armenian literary circles. In this essay, Petrossian speaks about "antipoetry"—poetry that does not look like poetry and challenges the prevailing notion of poetry—and asserts that it is the leading tendency in contemporary Armenian poetry.

Marine Petrossian is largely known in Armenia also as a columnist. In 2007-2009, a period of tense political developments before and after Armenian presidential election, 2008, she led a weekly column in Haikakan jamanak (Armenian Times) daily, the main opposition newspaper. Her essays on political issues of the day had an unprecedently large readership and made her a public figure in Armenia: many TV programs invite her to comment on public issues. These essays later were collected in her book Red Poster (2011). In 2007, Petrossian received "Tigran Hayrapetian" award for her essay "Why the War does not Come to an End".

== Books ==
- Բանաստեղծություններ, առաջին գիրք (Poems, First Book) Cossu, 1993
- J’apporterai des pierres, Editions Comp’Act, 1995, coll. Morani, 1995 ISBN 2-87661-117-1
- Կանոնական պատմություններ (Canonical stories), Zangak publishers, 1998
- Erevan, Editions Comp’Act, coll. Polygraphe, 2003 ISBN 2-87661-269-0
- Հայաստանի ծովափին (On Armenian Seashore), actual art publishers, 2006 ISBN 99941-801-1-8
- Una vegada a l’hivern (Poems of Marine Petrossian and Tigran Paskevichyan in Catalan), Institució de les Lletres Catalanes, 2008 ISBN 978-84-96716-95-7
- Կարմիր աֆիշ (Red Poster) actual art publishers, 2011 ISBN 978-9939-816-22-7
- Սալաթ կրակոցներով (Salad with Shots) actual art publishers, 2011 ISBN 978-9939-816-23-4
- Ատրճանակը կրակեց (The Gun Has Fired), actual art publishers, 2014 ISBN 978-9939-816-54-8
- Disparó el arma, audisea., 2015 ISBN 978-987-45617-2-5
