= Suren Khachatryan =

Armenian politician

Suren Khachatryan Սուրեն Խաչատրյան
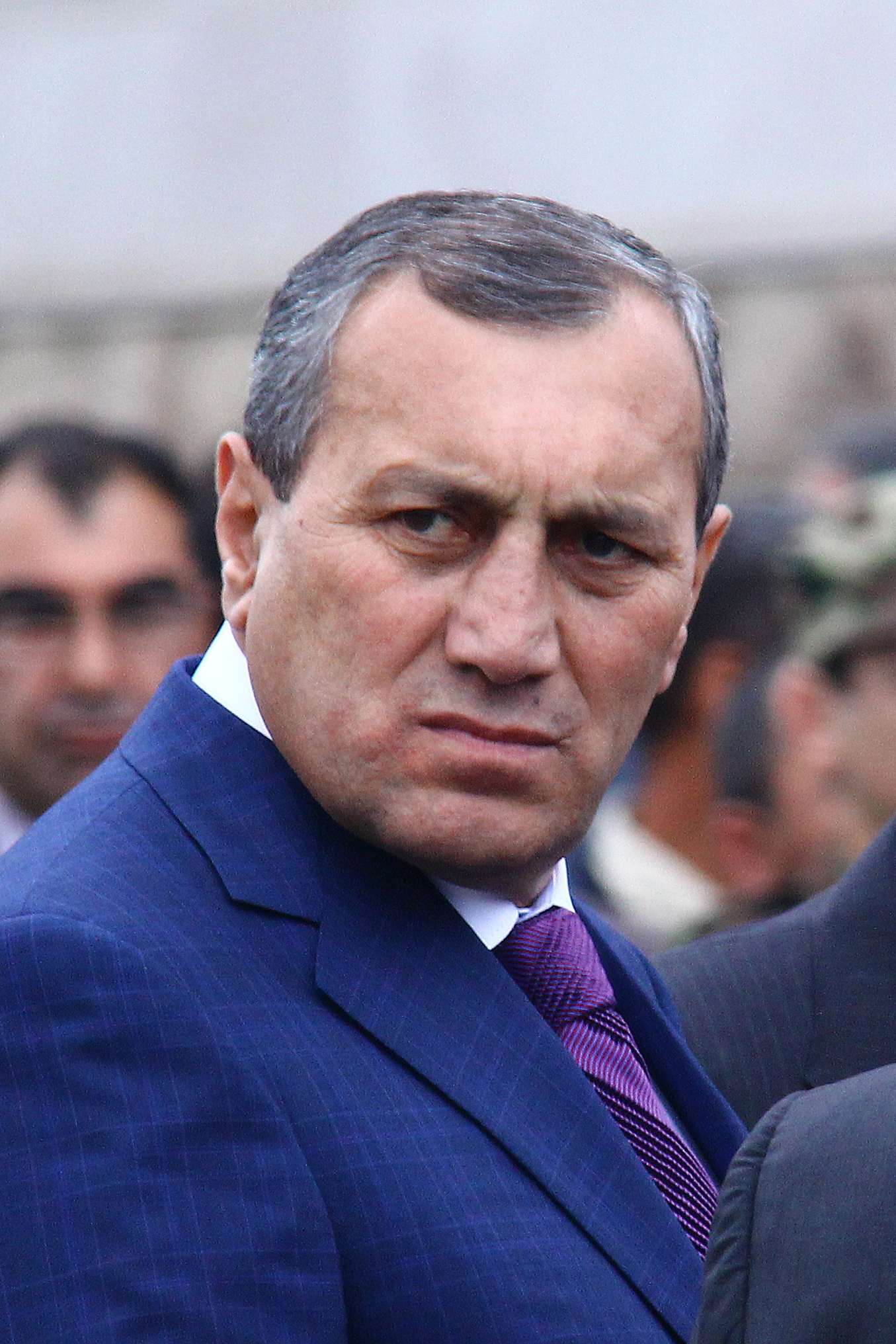

Governor of Syunik Province
- In office September 2014 – October 2016
- President: Serzh Sargsyan
- Prime Minister: Hovik Abrahamyan
- Preceded by: Vahe M. Hakobyan
- Succeeded by: Vahe A. Hakobyan
- In office 2004 – June 6, 2013
- Preceded by: Edik Barseghyan
- Succeeded by: Vahe M. Hakobyan

Deputy to the Armenian National Assembly
- In office 1999–2004

Mayor of Goris
- In office 1996–1999

Personal details
- Born: August 1, 1956 (age 69) Goris, Syunik Province
- Spouse: Married
- Children: 4

Suren Sergeyi Khachatryan (Armenian: Սուրեն Սերգեյի Խաչատրյան; born August 1, 1956), known as Liska, is an Armenian politician who formerly served as the governor of the Syunik Province of Armenia, a position from which he resigned in 2013, presumably because of a shooting incident near his mansion in Goris. Prior to that, from 1996 to 1999, he was the mayor of Goris. A member of Armenia's Republican Party, Khachatryan was also a deputy to the Armenian National Assembly from 1999 to 2004. He has a wife and four children.

On June 2, 2013, Suren Khachatryan's son shot dead Avetik Budaghyan, the brother of Artak Budaghyan, a Nagorno-Karabakh Republic military unit commander in front of Suren Khachatryan's house in Goris. Khachatryan was forced to resign on June 6, 2013, due to public pressure. He was reappointed as the governor of Syunik Province in September 2014 by Prime Minister Hovik Abrahamyan.

He was president of the Syunik provincial council of the Yerkrapah Volunteer Union.
