= Voghji, Syunik =

Voghji
- Location within Armenia Location within Syunik Province
- Coordinates: 39°08′39″N 46°08′43″E
- Country: Armenia
- Marz (Province): Syunik
- Time zone: UTC+4 ( )

Voghji (Armenian: Ողջի), is a former village in Syunik Province of Armenia, currently part of town of Kajaran.

== See also ==
- Syunik Province
