= Vahe Baghdasaryan =

Armenian chess player

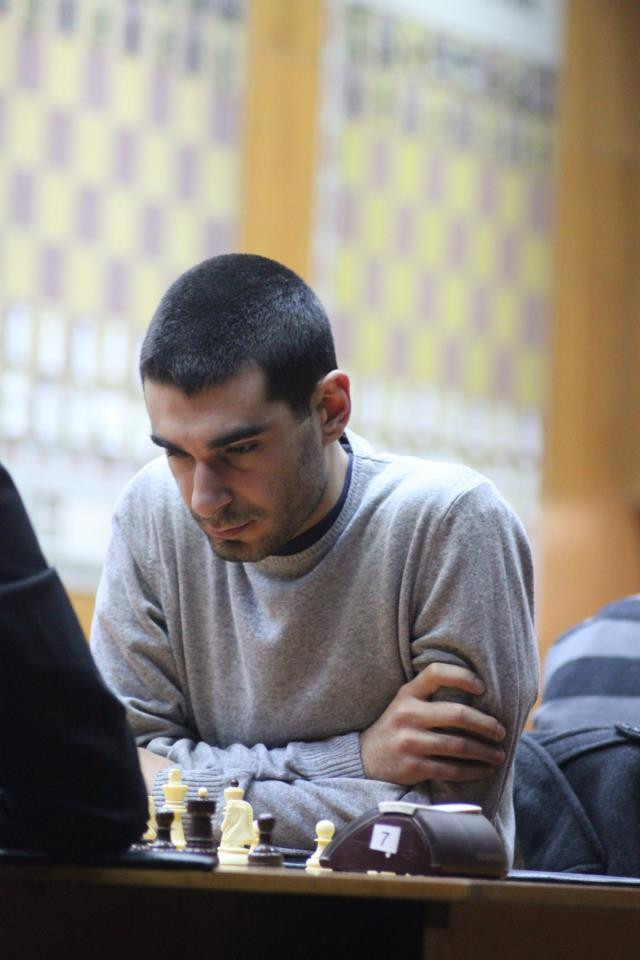
- Vahe Baghdasaryan in 2013

Personal information
- Born: 20 March 1993 (age 33) Yerevan, Armenia

Chess career
- Country: Armenia
- Title: Grandmaster (2017)
- Peak rating: 2501 (October 2016)

Vahe Baghdasaryan (born 20 March 1993, Yerevan, Armenia) is an Armenian chess player. He achieved the International Master (IM) title in 2012 and Grandmaster title in 2017. He won the 10th Nana Aleksandria Cup in July 2015.

== Notable tournaments ==
Tournament Name	Year	ELO	Points
12th Asrian Memorial 2019 (Jermuk ARM)	2019	2357	2.0
Aeroflot Open B 2015 (Moscow RUS)	2015	2400	6.5
