= Artak Davtyan (politician) =

Armenian economist and politician (1966–2023)

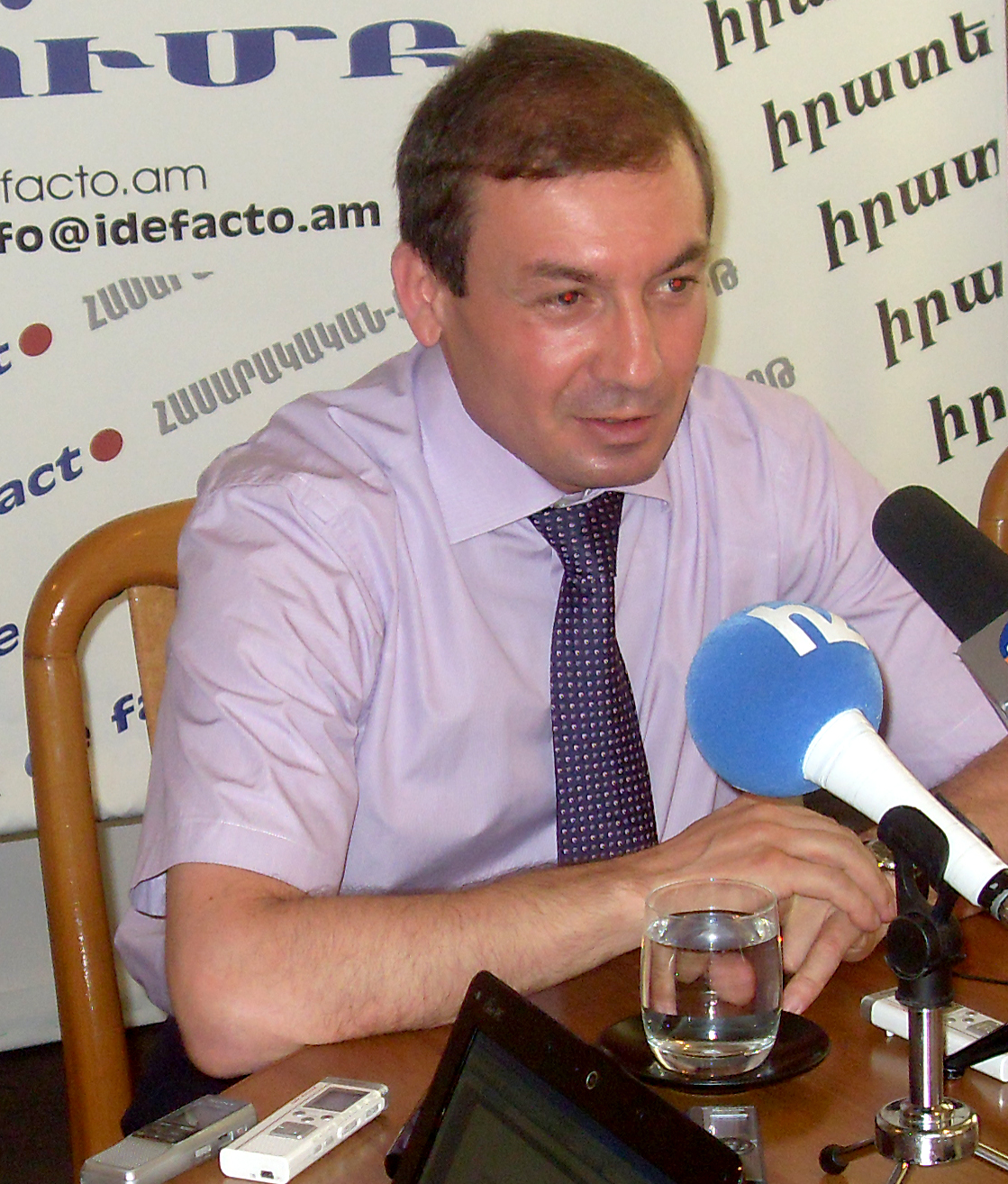
- Davtyan in 2012

Member of the National Assembly of Armenia
- In office 12 May 2007 – 2 March 2017

Personal details
- Born: Artak Ludviki Davtyan; 30 October 1966 Kajaran, Armenian SSR, USSR
- Died: 6 March 2023 (aged 56)
- Party: RPA
- Education: Armenian State University of Economics
- Occupation: Economist

Artak Ludviki Davtyan (Armenian: Արտակ Լյուդվիկի Դավթյան; 30 October 1966 – 6 March 2023) was an Armenian economist and politician. A member of the Republican Party of Armenia, he served in the National Assembly from 2007 to 2017.

Davtyan died on 6 March 2023, at the age of 56.
