= Vahé Godel =

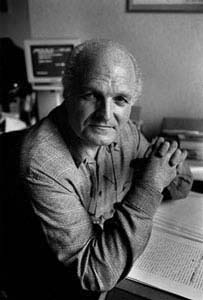
Vahé Godel

Vahé Godel (born 16 August 1931, in Geneva) is a French-speaking Swiss writer, translator and scholar of Armenian literature. He is the son of Robert Godel, a noted linguist and expert on the Armenian language, and Meline Papazian, an Armenian from Bursa. While being a well-known writer in his own right in his native Switzerland, Vahé Godel has also translated numerous Armenian poets, both past and present. His translations include: Odes et lamentations by Grégoire de Narek, Tous les désirs de l'âme by Grégoire de Narek and Nahabed Koutchag, Le chant du pain by Daniel Varoujan, J’apporterai des pierres and Erevan by Marine Petrossian.

His brother Armen Godel is an actor and director.
