= Mghart =

Town in Armenia

Mghart Մղարթ
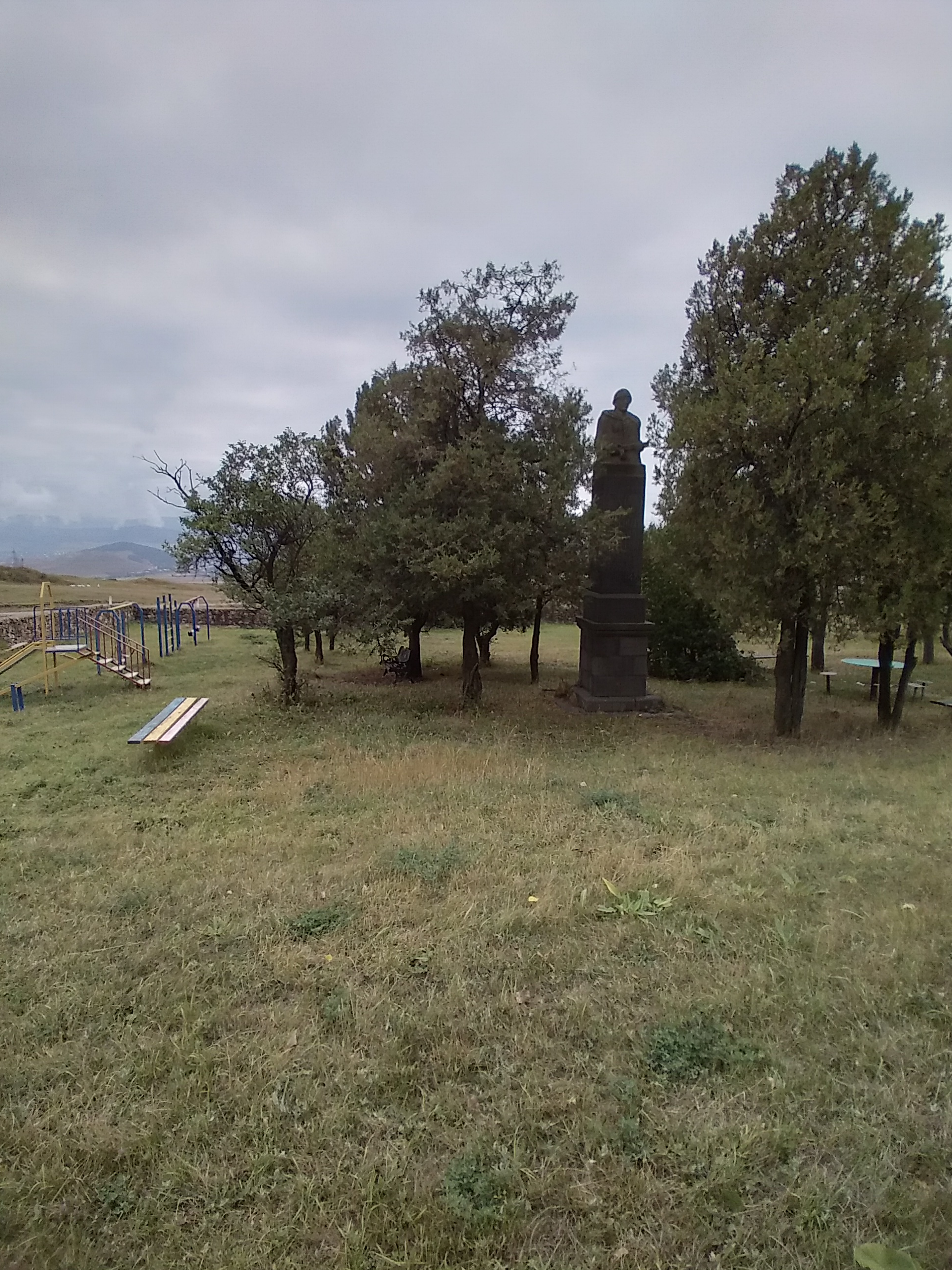

- Location within Armenia
- Coordinates: 40°59′53″N 44°34′57″E
- Country: Armenia
- Province: Lori
- Elevation: 1,425 m (4,675 ft)

Population (2011)
  - Total: 429
- Time zone: UTC+4 (AMT)

Mghart (Armenian: Մղարթ) is a village in the Lori Province of Armenia.

== Demographics ==
The village had 523 inhabitants in 2001, and 429 inhabitants in 2011.
