= Kajaran mine =

Copper and molybdenum mine in Kajaran, Syunik, Armenia

Kajaran Mine
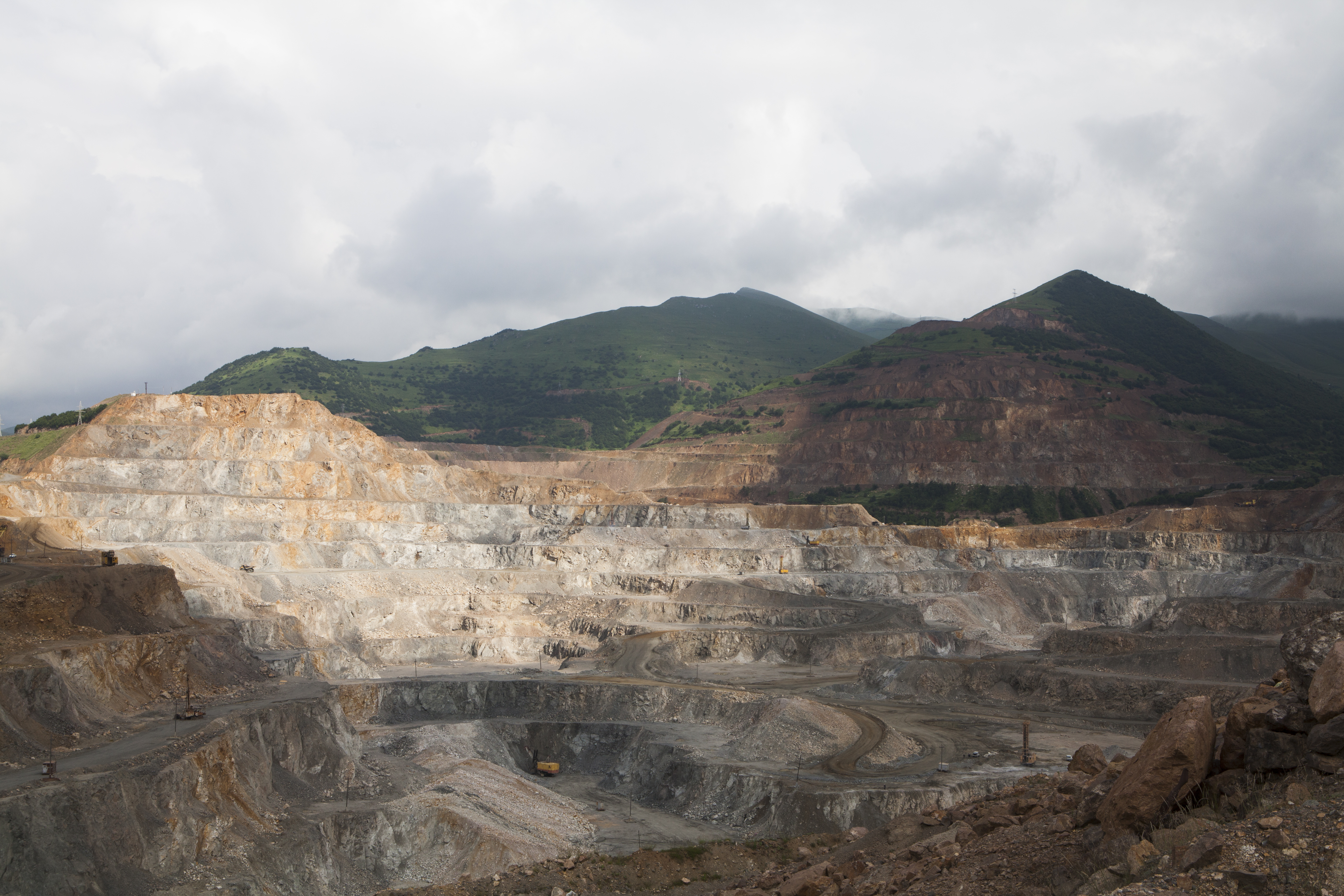
- The open-pit copper-molybdenum mine at Kajaran in 2013

- Location in Armenia
- Location: Kajaran, Syunik, Armenia; 39°08′42″N 46°08′17″E
- Products: Copper, molybdenum
- Opened: 1951
- Active: 1951-1991, 1994-present
- Company: Zangezur Copper and Molybdenum Combine
- Acquired: 2004

Kajaran Mine, also spelled Qajaran Mine, is an active copper and molybdenum open-pit mine in Armenia's southern province of Syunik in the town of Kajaran. The mine was established and began operating in 1952 after the discovery of reserves of molybdenum and copper during geological operations from 1930 to 1933. The operation was started by implementing underground mining before it shifted into open-pit mining in 1962. Under the ownership of Zangezur Copper and Molybdenum Combine, the mine produces 22 million tons of ore annually and is estimated to have reserves of 5.9 million tons of copper and 0.85 million tons of molybdenum.

== Description ==
Kajaran mine is a mineral deposit located in Kajaran, Syunik Province, Armenia at coordinates 39.14389,46.13778. It is located in Zangezur in the valley of the Voghji at elevation of 1,800 metres (5,900 ft) to 3,900 metres (12,800 ft). The processing plant is located close to the mine and within 27 km from the Artsvanik tailing dump.

== History ==
The geological exploration of the deposit began in 1880, and from 1930 to 1933, reserves of molybdenum along with copper were discovered. In 1936, a technical and economical report was compiled and approved by the Academy of Sciences of the Union of Soviet Socialist Republics(USSR) and the People's Commissariat for Non-ferrous Metallurgy, which led to the establishment of Kajaran mine. In 1949, an enrichment plant was built and in 1952, the mine was started operating for the first time. At the beginning, the mining was operating with underground mining and it shifted into open-pit mining in 1962. After the collapse of the USSR in 1991, the operation was stopped and restarted again 1994.

== Operation ==
It is owned and operated by Zangezur Copper and Molybdenum Combine. The mine was estimated to contain reserves of 5.9 million tons of copper and 0.85 million tons of molybdenum witt an annual production of 22 million tons of ore.

== Gallery ==
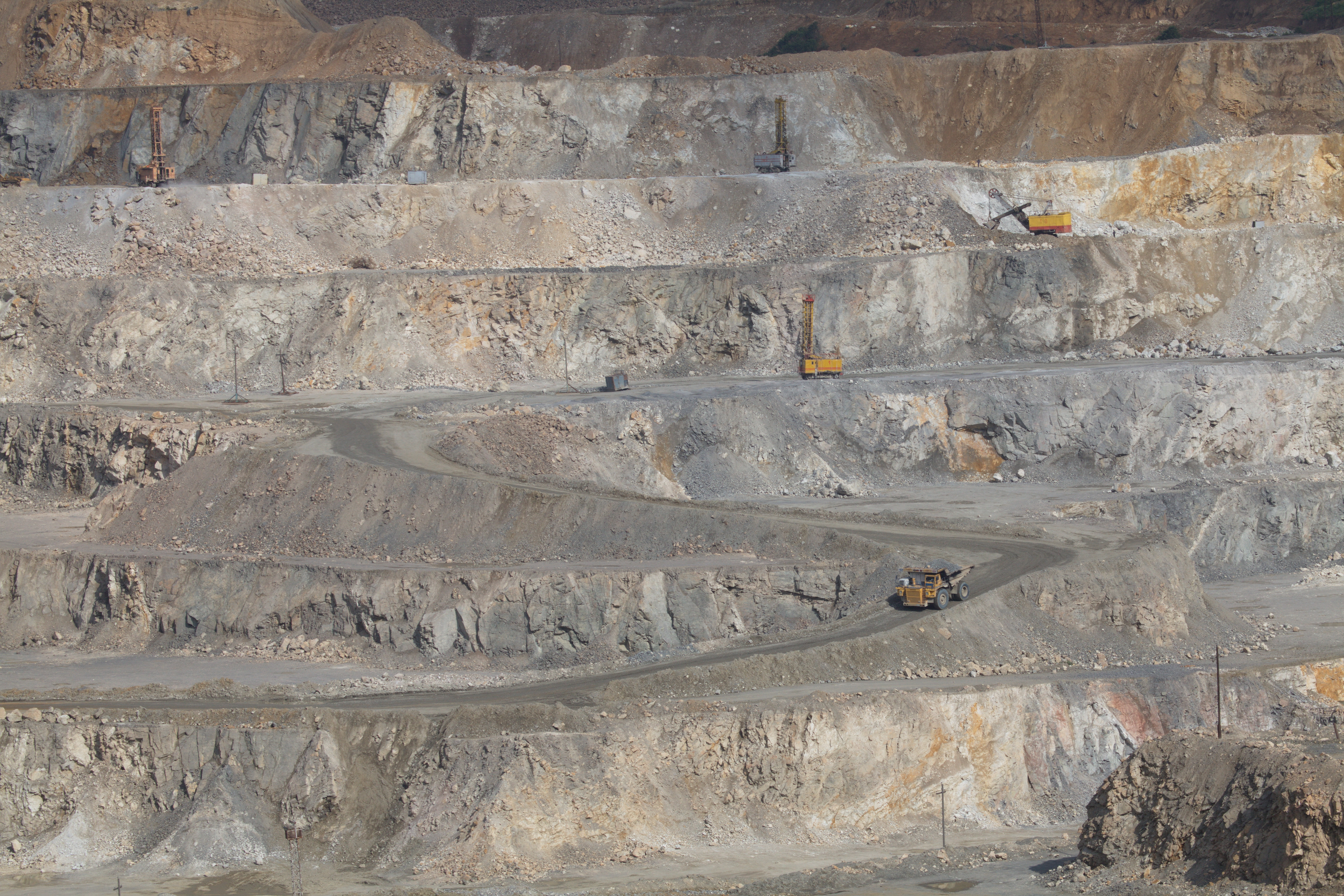
Closeup of mine operations in 2013

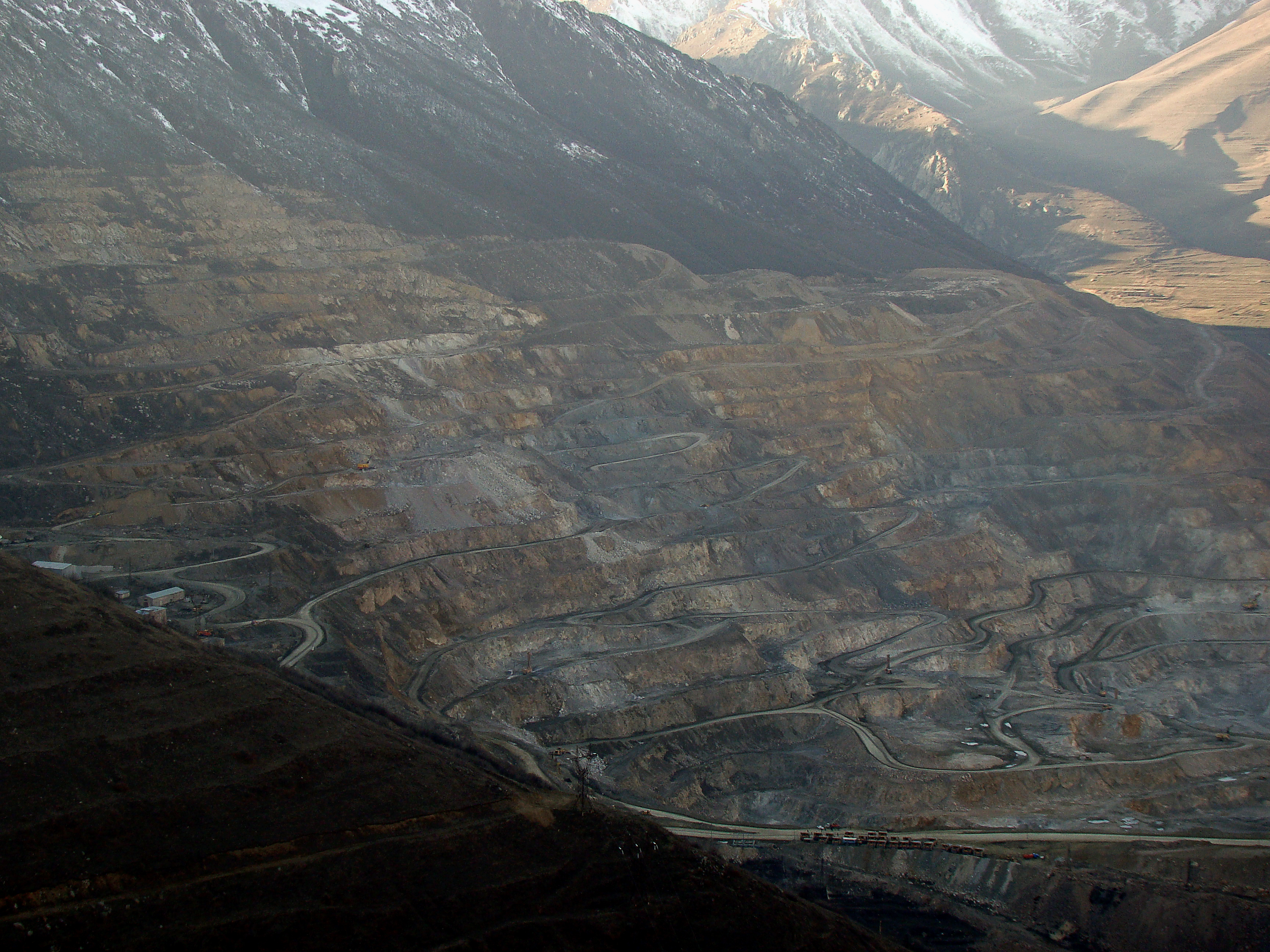
The mine in 2008

== See also ==
- Mineral industry of Armenia
