= Vahe A. Hakobyan =

Armenian politician

Vahe Hakobyan
- Վահե Հակոբյան

Former Governor of Syunik Province
- In office October 4, 2016 – June 8, 2018
- President: Serzh Sargsyan
- Prime Minister: Karen Karapetyan
- Preceded by: Suren Khachatryan
- Succeeded by: Karen Hambardzumyan

Personal details
- Born: June 12, 1971 (age 54) Yerevan, Armenian SSR, Soviet Union
- Children: 4

Vahe Alberti Hakobyan (Armenian: Վահե Ալբերտի Հակոբյան; born June 12, 1971, in Yerevan) is a former Armenian politician. He previously served as the governor of Syunik Province of Armenia from October 6, 2016, until June 2018. Prior to that, from 1996 to 1999, he was first deputy director general at the mining company Zangezur Copper and Molybdenum Combine. He is married with three daughters and one son.
