= Dastakert =

Dastakert Դաստակերտ
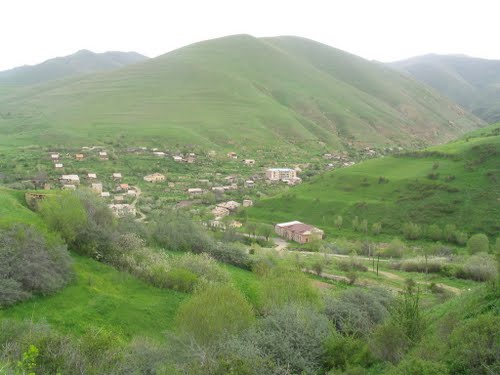

- Location within Armenia Location within Syunik Province
- Coordinates: 39°22′06″N 46°02′12″E
- Country: Armenia
- Province: Syunik
- Municipality: Sisian
- First mentioned: 12th century

Area
  - Total: 0.5 km^{2} (0.19 sq mi)
- Elevation: 2,050 m (6,730 ft)

Population (2022)
  - Total: 227
  - Density: 450/km^{2} (1,200/sq mi)
- Time zone: UTC+4 (AMT)

Dastakert (Armenian: Դաստակերտ) is a village in the Sisian Municipality of the Syunik Province in Armenia. It is located 225 km south of the capital Yerevan and 115 km northwest of the provincial centre Kapan. According to the 2022 census, the current population of Dastakert is 227.

== Etymology ==
Founded as a summer resort for the monks of the nearby Tatev monastery, the name of the village is derived from the old Armenian word Dastakert (Armenian: Դաստակերտ), literally meaning summer resort or backyard.

== History ==
=== Middle Ages ===
Dastakert was first mentioned by the historian Stephen Orbelian as a small village, in his 12th-century work History of the Province of Syunik. According to Orbelian, Dastakert was founded as a summer resort for the monks of the nearby Tatev monastery.

Between the 12th and 15th centuries, Syunik along with the rest of the historic territories of Armenia suffered from the Seljuk, Mongol, Aq Qoyunlu and Kara Koyunlu invasions, respectively.

=== Iranian and Russian rule ===
At the beginning of the 16th century, Syunik became part of the Erivan Province within the Safavid Persia. At the beginning of the 18th century, the region was involved in the liberation campaign of the Armenians of Syunik led by David Bek, against Safavid Persia and the invading Ottoman Turks. David Bek started his battles in 1722 with the help of thousands of local Armenian patriots who liberated Syunik.

In 1813, Syunik (including Dastakert) became part of the Russian Empire as a result of the Russo-Persian War of 1804–13 and the signing of the Treaty of Gulistan, between Russia and Qajar Persia. In 1868, it became part of the Zangezursky Uyezd, within the Elisabethpol Governorate of the Russian Empire.

=== 20th century and beyond ===
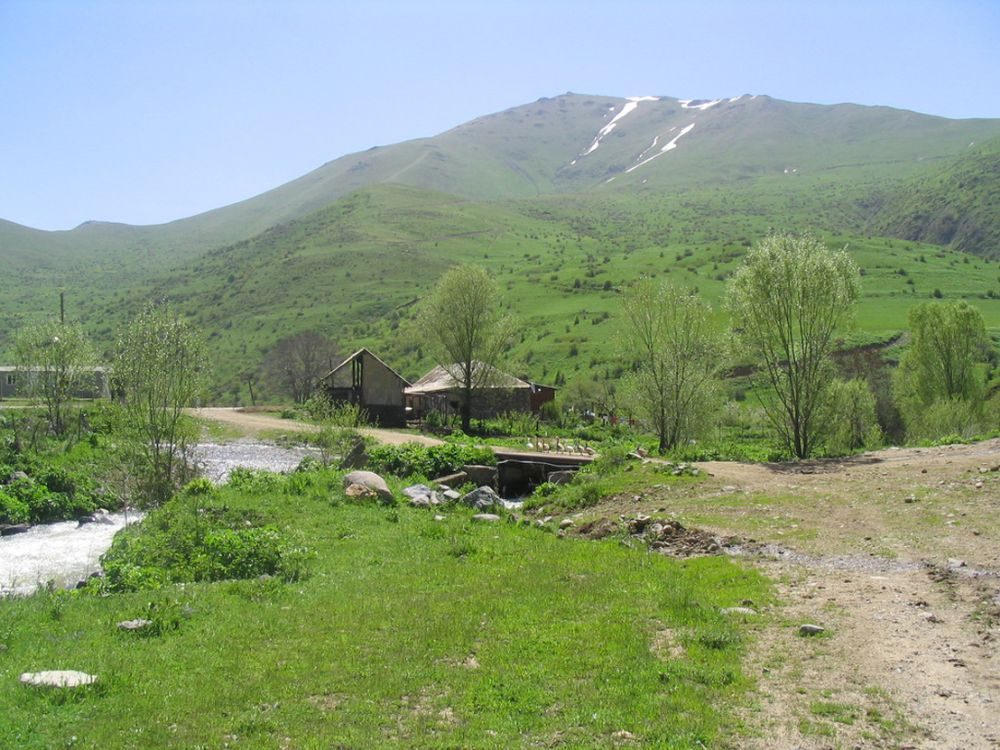
Dastakert landscape

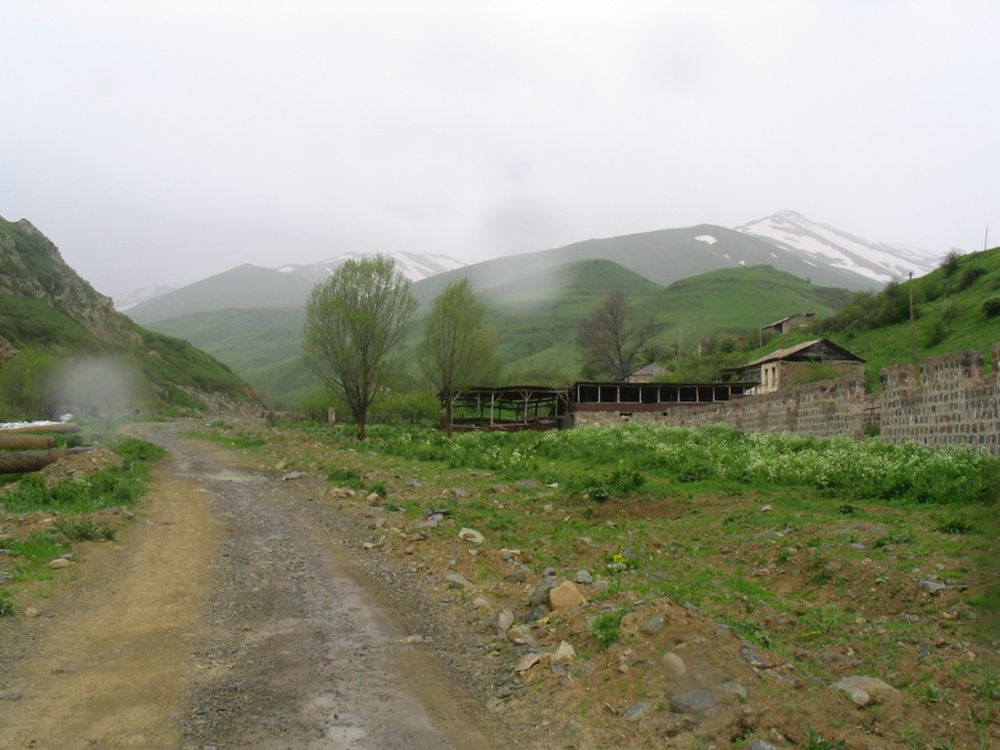
Dastakert and the Zangezur Mountains

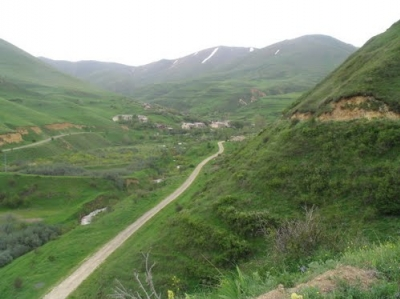
Scenery around Dastakert

With the establishment of the Republic of Armenia in 1918, Dastakert was included within the Zangezur region of the newly-founded republic. However, after the fall of the republic in December 1920, the 2nd Pan-Zangezurian congress held in Tatev on 26 April 1921, announced the independence of the self-governing regions of Daralakyaz (Vayots Dzor), Zangezur (including Dastakert), and parts of Mountainous Artsakh, under the name of the Republic of Mountainous Armenia (Lernahaystani Hanrapetutyun). However, the self-proclaimed republic had a short life as the Red Army started conducting massive military operations in the region during June–July 1921, attacking Syunik from the north and east. As a result of fierce battles, the Republic of Mountainous Armenia capitulated on 13 July 1921, following Soviet Russia's promises to keep the mountainous region of Syunik part of Soviet Armenia.

During the Soviet period, the Dastakert copper and molybdenum mines were found in 1945. With the establishment of the Dastakert branch of the Zangezur copper-molybdenum plant in 1951, Dastakert was granted the status of an urban-type settlement within the Sisian raion. In 1968 – the period of the Soviet heydays – Dastakert had over 4,000 residents.

However, following the closure of the copper-molybdenum combine in 1975, the population drastically declined. Following the independence of Armenia, Dastakert retained its status as an urban settlement until the administrative reforms of November 2017, when it was turned into a rural settlement as part of the Sisian community.

According to the 2011 census the population of Dastakert was 323, up from 287 reported during the 2001 census. As of 2022, 227 residents live in Dastakert, most of them being Armenian refugees from Azerbaijan.

== Geography ==
Historically, the area of Dastakert was part of Tsghuk canton (Armenian: Ծղուկք գավառ Tsghukk gavar), at the heart of the ancient Syunik province of Armenia Major.

Dastakert is situated on the slopes of Mount Ayri of the Zangezur Range, near the roots of the Ayri River (a tributary of the Sisian River). At an average height of 2,050 meters above sea level, Dastakert is regarded as a mountainous settlement.

== Demographics ==
=== Population ===
Dastakert is one of the smallest settlements in Armenia. It was one of the smallest urban settlements in the world in terms of population. The population of Dastakert grew significantly during the 1950s and 1960s after the opening of the Dastakert branch of the copper-molybdenum plant, exceeding 4,000 residents. Since the mid-1970s, the population has gradually declined with the closure of the plant.

Population timeline of Dastakert since 1908:

Historical population
Year	Pop.	±% p.a.
1908	555	—
1922	358	−3.08%
1959	2,405	+5.28%
1976	3,655	+2.49%
2001	287	−9.68%
2011	323	+1.19%
2022	227	−3.16%

Healthcare in Dastakert is provided by the nearby Sisian Medical Center.

== Municipal administration ==
Dastakert was Armenia's smallest urban community in terms of both population and area until November 2017 when it became a rural settlement.

== Culture ==
The cultural heritage of Dastakert includes a medieval settlement located 2 km northwest of Dastakert, a medieval cemetery in the north of the city, and a khachkar dating back to 1320. There is a lithographic inscription 2 km north of Dastakert on a rock known by the locals as Vardapet, dating back to the 14th century.

Dastakert is currently home to a public education high school, a cultural centre, a music school, as well as a public library run by the municipality.

== Transportation ==
Dastakert can be only reached by the regional H-45 road that connects the village with Sisian in the north, near the Tolors reservoir.

== Economy ==
In 1995, the government of independent Armenia reaffirmed the status of Dastakert as an urban settlement within the Syunik Province, until November 2017 when the settlement was stripped of its status and became a village. The economy of the village is one of the poorest in Armenia.

Most of the village's residents are involved in agriculture. However, only 8% of them have permanent jobs, mainly in the post office, the municipal administration and the school. In recent years, a branch of the Zangezur Copper and Molybdenum Combine with its ore-dressing mill was opened on the basis of Dastakert's old Soviet copper-molybdenum plant.

== Gallery ==
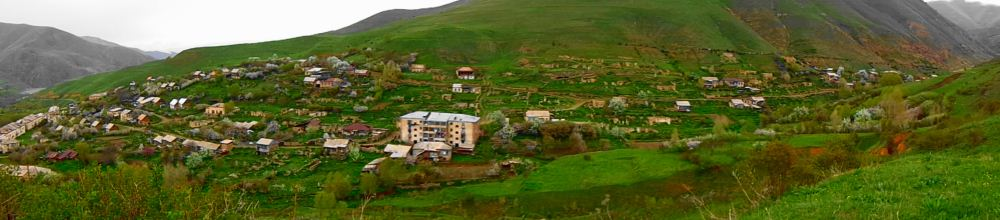
Panorama of Dastakert

== See also ==
- Syunik (historic province)
- Zangezur Copper and Molybdenum Combine
