= Shamlugh =

City in Lori, Armenia

Shamlugh Շամլուղ
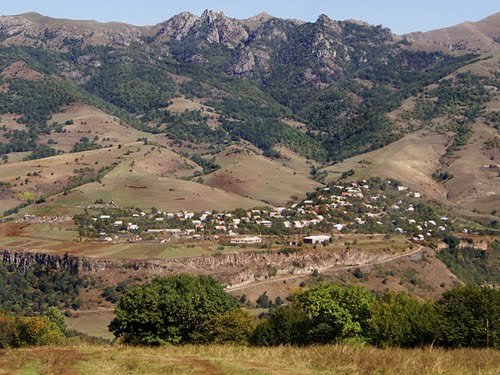

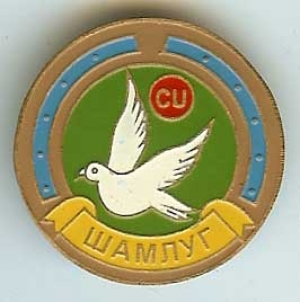
- Coat of arms

- Location within Armenia
- Coordinates: 41°10′05″N 44°42′27″E
- Country: Armenia
- Province: Lori
- Founded: 1770

Area
  - Total: 3.6 km^{2} (1.4 sq mi)
- Elevation: 810 m (2,660 ft)

Population (2022)
  - Total: 690
  - Density: 190/km^{2} (500/sq mi)
- Time zone: UTC+4 (AMT)

Shamlugh (Armenian: Շամլուղ) is a village in the Lori Province in northeastern Armenia. It is situated on the left bank of Debed River, at a road distance of 196 km (122 mi) north of the capital Yerevan and 63 km (39 mi) north of the provincial centre Vanadzor. The village had a majority Greek population; however, it is now predominantly populated by Armenians. According to the 2011 census, Shamlugh had 700 inhabitants, while the 2016 official estimate shows the current population is around 500.

== Etymology ==
As a rural community in the Borchali uyezd of the Tiflis Governorate within the Russian Empire, the settlement of Shamlugh used to bear the names Shamlug, Samblud, Shamblugh and later Shamlugh.

== History ==
Historically, the area of modern-day Shamlugh was part of the Dzobopor canton of ancient Gugark; the 13th province of the historic Greater Armenia.

Under the rule of the Persian Afsharid dynasty over Eastern Armenia, copper mining became popular in the region of Lori, especially during the second half of the 18th century, as many Greek miners from Gyumushkhane migrated to the area and built a copper factory in 1770, thus stimulating the gradual development of the whole region and setting the ground for the foundation of Shamlugh in the 1770s, settled originally by ethnic Greeks.

In 1801, together with the Georgian provinces of Kartli and Kakheti, Lori was annexed by the Russian Empire to become part of the Georgia Governorate. The region became officially part of the Russian Empire as per the Treaty of Gulistan signed on 1 January 1813 between Imperial Russia and the Qajar dynasty. As part of the region of Lori, the village of Shamlugh became part of the Borchali uyezd in 1880, within the Tiflis Governorate of the Russian Empire. Between 1887 and 1914, the Shamlugh copper mine along with the mine of Akhtala were exploited by the Compagnie Française des Mines d'Akhtala.

In late 1918, Armenia and Georgia fought a border war over Lori. With the British intervention the Lori "neutral zone" was created including the region of Shamlugh, only to be reoccupied by Georgia after the fall of the Armenian Republic at the end of 1920. Following the sovietization of Armenia in December 1920, Lori was finally incorporated into Soviet Armenia on 11 February 1921.

As rural settlement, Shamlugh became part of the Alavaerdi raion, formed in 1930 within the Armenian Soviet Socialist Republic. In 1938, Shamlugh was turned into an urban-type settlement. In 1969, the Alavardi raion was renamed Tumanyan.

The population of Shamlugh reached 4,500 in 1979. The majority of the population consisted of Greeks, followed by Armenians, with a small population of Azerbaijanis. During the conflicts of 1988-1989 most of the Azerbaijanis migrated to the Republic of Azerbaijan. Most of the ethnic Greeks left Shamlugh as a result of the poor economic conditions. In 1989, the copper mine of Shamlugh was closed due to ecological reasons.

Following the independence of Armenia in 1991, the status of Shamlugh as an urban settlement was reaffirmed in the 1995 administrative reforms of independent Armenia within the newly-formed Lori Province. However, following the November 2017 administrative reforms, Shamlugh was reorganized from an urban community to a rural settlement as part of the community of Akhtala.

Currently, Shamlugh suffers from its extremely poor infrastructure. The outdated school building has never been renovated, while the ravaged regional roads, devastated sewage system and drinking water pipes are in urgent need of reconstruction. In 2001, the Shamlugh copper mine was brought back into operation by a local private company.

== Geography ==
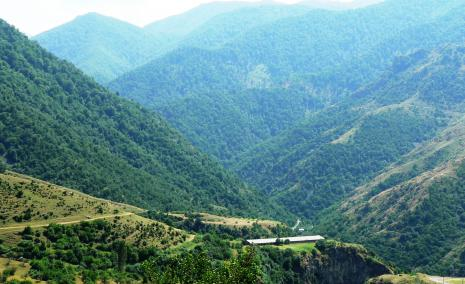
Shamlugh countryside

Covering an area of 3.6 km², Shamlugh is located in the northeast of Armenia, around 4 km (2.5 mi) south of the Armenia-Georgia border, and 7 km (4.3 mi) west of the Vanadzor-Tbilisi highway. It is situated in the eastern part of the Somkheti mountain range, at an elevation of 810 meters above sea level.

Surrounded by thick forests and meadows, Shamlugh has a subtropical climate, with dry cool summers and mild winters. Annual precipitation ranges between 500–600 mm (20–24 in). From an agro-climate point of view it is in an intensive irrigation zone.

== Demographics ==
The first settlers of Shamlugh were Greek miners from Gyumushkhane, who migrated to the area to build a copper factory in 1770. The population of Shamlugh reached its peak in 1979, with about 4,500 inhabitants, with a majority of Greeks and Armenians, and a minority of Azerbaijanis. However, following the breakout of the First Nagorno-Karabakh War, in 1988-1989 most of the Azerbaijanis migrated to Azerbaijan. Following the closure of the Shamlugh copper mine in 1989, the dissolution of the Soviet Union in 1991, and the resulting economic crisis, the population of the settlement has further declined to around 500 as per the 2016 official estimate, with a majority of Armenians and a minority of Greeks.

Historical population
Year	Pop.	±% p.a.
1873	94	—
1897	862	+9.67%
1926	836	−0.11%
1939	1,874	+6.41%
1959	2,864	+2.14%
1964	3,127	+1.77%
1979	4,500	+2.46%
1989	1,523	−10.27%
2001	882	−4.45%
2011	700	−2.28%
2022	690	−0.13%

The Armenians of Shamlugh belong to the Armenian Apostolic Church regulated by the Diocese of Gougark. The small community of Greeks is served by the Saint George's Greek Orthodox chapel, opened in 1909.

== Culture ==
A 10th to 13th century cemetery site as well as a 13th-century khachkar (cross-stone) complex are preserved near Shamlugh, around 3 km (1.9 mi) to the south of the village. According to historian Yeghishe Sahakyan, the archaeological site located 5 km (3.1 mi) southwest of Shamlugh is most probably associated with the medieval Armenian settlement of Manits Gom, dating back to the 10-13th centuries. The remains of three churches are located on the site. A Greek chapel dedicated to Saint George opened in 1909 and renovated in the 1970s is found in the village.

Shamlugh is currently served by a cultural centre and a public library.

== Transportation ==
Shamlugh is located near the border with Georgia, and is 7 km (4.3 mi) west of the Vanadzor-Tbilisi highway (Armenia’s M-6 motorway). It is connected with the nearby villages by outdated regional roads that have not been reconstructed since the dissolution of the Soviet Union. As of 2017, the internal streets of the village are also in a very bad condition.

== Economy ==
The economy of the village is mainly based on the mining plant which is owned by the Metal Prince Armenian mining company. Approximately 10% of the population work in the copper plant.

A considerable number of the inhabitants in Shamlugh are involved in agriculture and cattle-breeding activities. There are reserves of clay as well, which are being utilized for industrial purposes.

== Education ==
Shamlugh has a public education school and a kindergarten. Both of the buildings are outdated and have not been renovated since they were constructed in the Soviet era.
