= Kajaran =

City in Syunik, Armenia

Kajaran Քաջարան
- Town
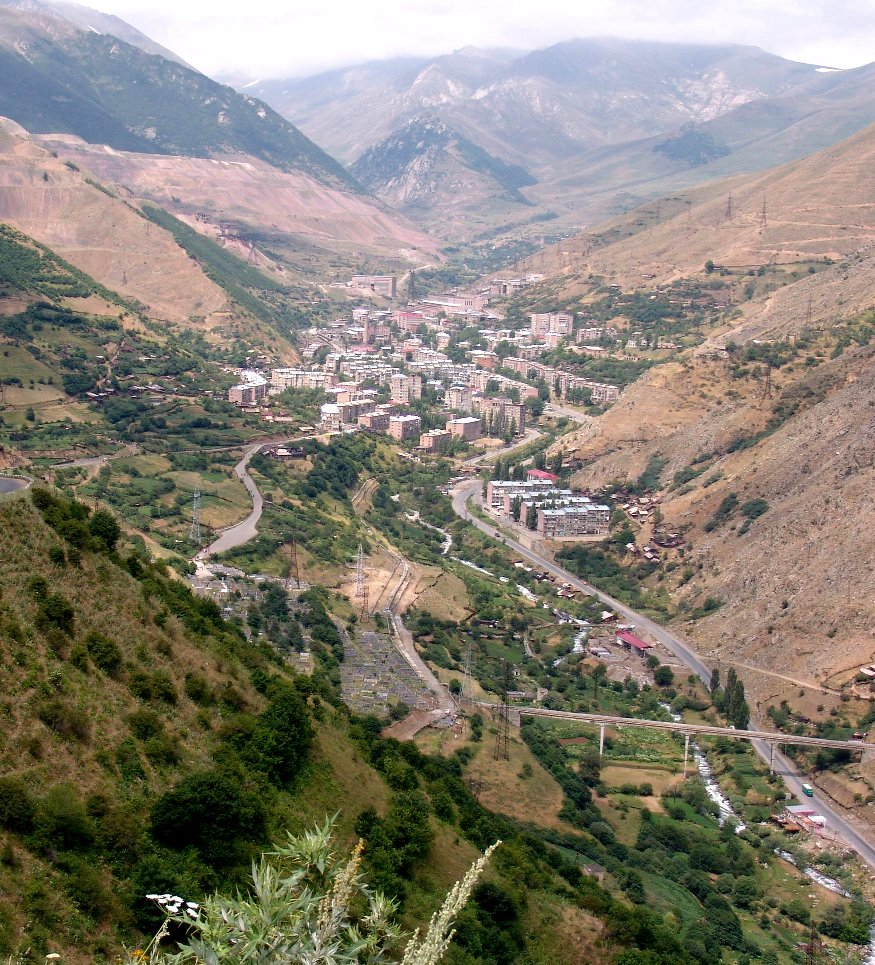
- View of Kajaran

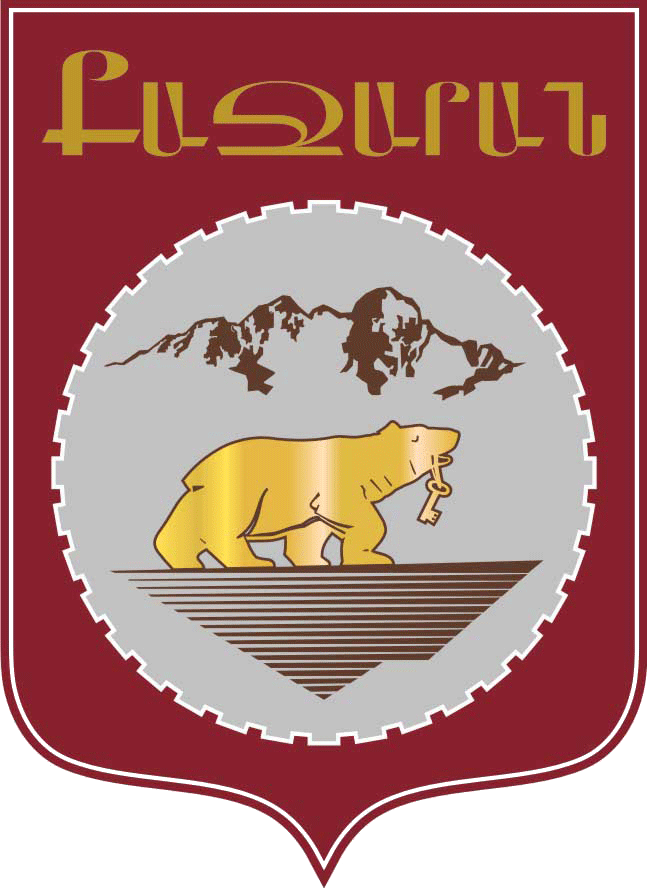
- Seal

- Location within Armenia Location within Syunik Province
- Coordinates: 39°09′04″N 46°09′36″E
- Country: Armenia
- Province: Syunik
- Municipality: Kajaran
- Founded: 1947

Area
  - Total: 2.8 km^{2} (1.1 sq mi)
- Elevation: 1,950 m (6,400 ft)

Population (2022 census)
  - Total: 6,355
  - Density: 2,300/km^{2} (5,900/sq mi)
- Time zone: UTC+4 (AMT)
- Website: Official website

Kajaran (Armenian: Քաջարան [kʰɑdʒɑˈɾɑn]) is a town and the centre of the Kajaran Municipality of the Syunik Province in southern Armenia. It is located 356 km south of the capital Yerevan, 25 km west of the provincial centre Kapan, and 50 km north of the Armenia-Iran border.

As of the 2011 census, the population of the town was 7,163. As per the 2016 official estimate, Kajaran has a population of 7,100. As of the 2022 census, the population of the town was 6,355.

== Etymology ==
The name Kajaran is derived from the Armenian word Kaj (Armenian: Քաջարան) meaning brave, and the suffix aran (Armenian: Քաջարան) referring to place. Thus, the word Kajaran is translated from Armenian as the place of braves. The name is derived from the nearby old village of Kajarants.

It is believed that the old spelling of the name was Kachachut (Armenian: Կաճաճուտ), mentioned by Stephen Orbelian in his 13th century work History of Syunik Province. In the late Middle Ages, the spelling was changed to Kchanants (Armenian: Քչանանց) which is still in use in the local accent of Syunik. By the end of the 18th and the beginning of the 19th centuries, the name Kajarants was also used until the mid 20th century, when the name Kajaran was officially adopted.

== History ==
The area of Kajaran has been settled since the 3rd-2nd millenniums BC. The pagan temple found in the area testifies that. Metal was processed here since the Bronze Age. The old village of Kajarants -currently located 2 kilometers west of present-day town of Kajaran-, was part of the Dzork canton of the historic Syunik province of the ancient Kingdom of Armenia.

Between the 10th and 12th centuries, the region was included within the Kingdom of Syunik. However, like most of the historic territories of Armenia, Syunik suffered from the Seljuk, Mongol, Aq Qoyunlu and Kara Koyunlu invasions, respectively, between the 12th and 15th centuries.

At the beginning of the 16th century, the region became part of Safavid Persia. At the beginning of the 18th century, the Armenian population of Kajarants and the surrounding area was largely involved in the Armenian liberation campaign led by David Bek, against Safavid Persia and the invading Ottoman Turks. The Persians ruled until the beginning of the 19th century, many territories of Armenia -including Syunik-, became part of the Russian Empire as a result of the Treaty of Gulistan signed on 24 October 1813, between Russia and Qajar Persia.

Under the Russian rule, the first copper mines of the area of Kajarants were exploited between 1850 and 1910. A copper processing plant was founded near the old village of Kajarants in 1850 by Greek engineers and workers. In 1868, the region became part of the Zangezursky Uyezd of Elisabethpol Governorate.

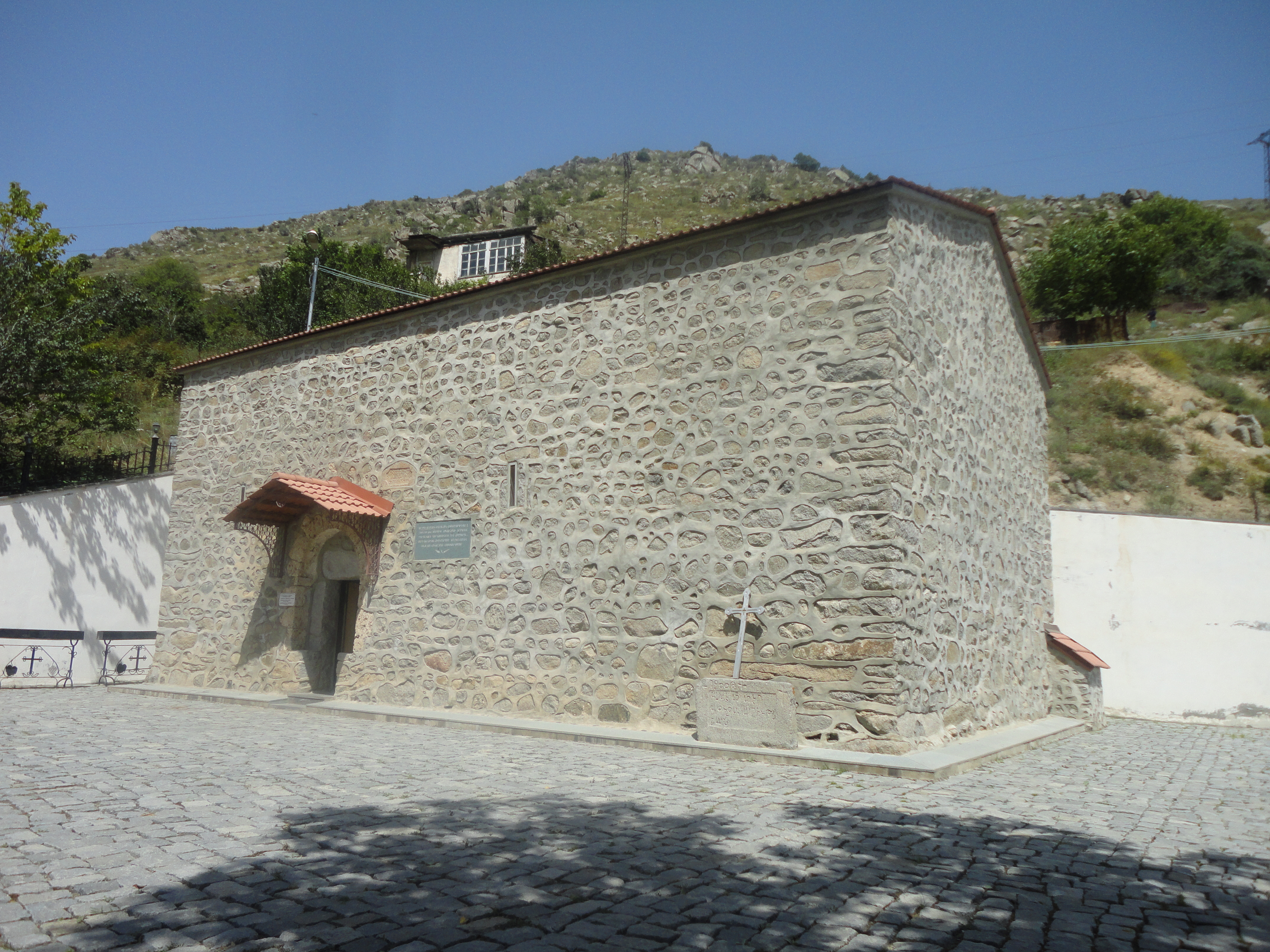
Holy Mother of God Church in Kajaran, consecrated in 1912

Between 1918 and 1920, Kajarants was part of the independent Republic of Armenia. Later in 1921, it became part of the breakaway Republic of Mountainous Armenia under the commandment of Garegin Nzhdeh. In July 1921, the Soviet Red Army entered Syunik and the region became part of Soviet Armenia.

After the discovery of huge copper deposits in 1930, the Soviet government proposed to build a large copper-molybdenum plant. By the end of the 1930s, a plan was proposed to build a settlement near the copper deposits area. The construction of the plant was launched in 1940, but soon after it was interrupted due to the World War II. In 1944, the construction process was resumed and the first product started in 1945. In 1951, the Zangezur state-owned mining company was formed to organize the production process, becoming one of the largest enterprises of the Soviet Union at that time.

In order to facilitate the copper and molybdenum production of the plant, the urban-type settlement of Kajaran was founded by the Soviet Armenian government in 1947, within the Kapan raion. As a result of the merger of Kajaran with the nearby settlement of Voghji in 1958, Kajaran was granted with the status of a town, with a population of around 11,000. The majority of the population of Kajaran were Armenian workers resettled from the town of Kapan and the Nagorno-Karabakh Autonomous Oblast.

In 1965, the major urban plan of Kajaran composed by architects A. Harutyunyan and H. Davtyan was approved. In 1970, the technical industrial development plan of Kapan and Kajaran was launched by the local Soviet government.

With the independence of Armenia in 1991, a new administrative reform was applied in 1995, abolishing the raions of the Soviet period. Thus, Kajaran was included within the newly formed Syunik Province. The Zangezur Copper and Molybdenum Combine continued its operations after the independence until 1994, when it was ceased due to the post-independence economic crisis. In 2004, production was relaunched after the privatization of the plant. Nowadays, the Zangezur plant is one of the largest industrial firms of Armenia.

In September 2013, President Serzh Sargsyan visited Kajaran to attend the opening ceremony of the Kajaran medical centre.

== Geography ==
Historically, Kajaran is located in the Dzork canton of the historic province of Syunik. The town is located on the border of two natural landscapes, alpine and highland forests at an average height of 1950 meters above sea level, on the banks of Voghji river, between the Zangezur Mountains and Meghri range. Mount Kaputjugh which is the highest peak of Zangezour Mountains at 3905 meters, is located few kilometers west of Kajaran. The relief is composed of placate rock strata of Araa river basin and is characterized by active erosion.

=== Climate ===
Kajaran is located in an alpine climate zone. The average annual temperature is +6,9C, with the absolute maximum of +33,5C and the absolute minimum of -18.5C. Annual precipitation level is 600-705mm, mostly occurring in May–June, when it reaches 99-104mm, with maximum daily level of 66mm. The average humidity is 69% with May being the most humid month of the year (74%).

=== Mineral resources ===
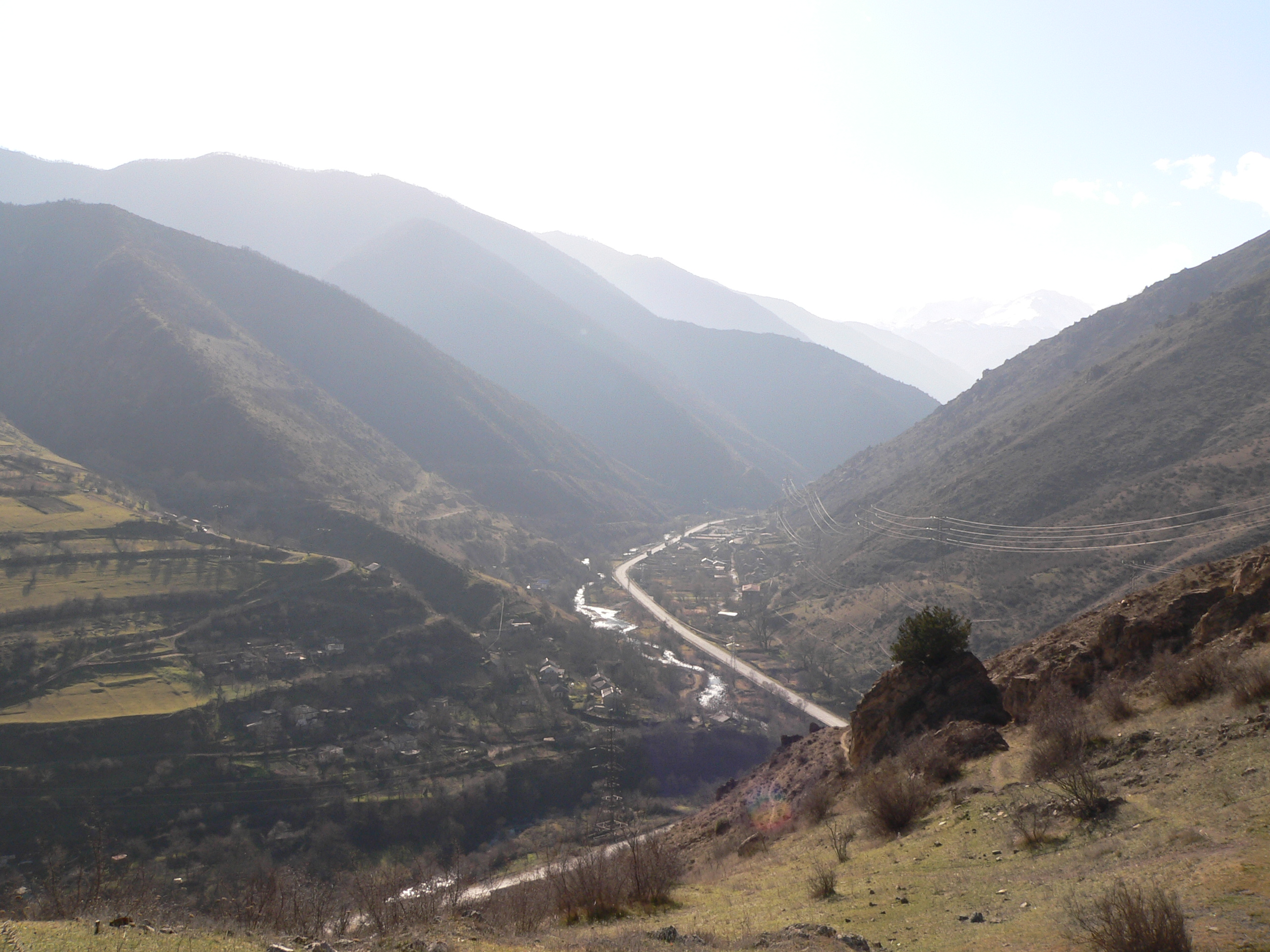
Kapan-Kajaran road

Syunik is rich in mineral resources, including stone and ore resources. Armenia's biggest copper and molybdenum mine is located in Syunik. The mine was prospected in 1931, the exploitation started in 1952. The ore mainly contains molybdenite, chalcopyrite, magnetite and pyrite. It also contains valuable accompanying elements like gold, silver, rhenium, selenium and bismuth. Thick (up to 5m) quartz veins, containing significant amounts of molybdenum and copper are also quite common. The mine of Kajaran contains 87% of copper and 8% of molybdenum deposits of the region. The city is home to the Zangezur Copper and Molybdenum Combine.

=== Water resources ===
Kajaran belongs to the South Water Basin Management area. River Voghji (the length is 82 km, the catchment area is 1175sq.km) flows through the city; it starts from the confluence of Kajarants and Kaputjugh rivers, 6 km away from the Kajaran. Voghji is a typical mountain river with rugged stream bed and developed hydrographic network. It feeds both from thawing snow runoffs and groundwaters, with prevalence of one of its tributaries, Tzaghkari. It then flows into Arax river, at an altitude of 350m above sea level.

=== Land resources ===
The community is located at an altitude of up to 1950 meters above sea level. The soil is mostly gray and brown. Southern slopes are covered by typical alpine scrub grasslands with weak alpine turf soil. The total land area of the community is 1412ha, of which1342.59ha are owned by the community with the rest is public land.

=== Biodiversity ===
Kajaran is a part of Holarctis floristic province, Zangezur region, Voghji-Geghi area, characterised by prevalence of mesophytic, eurivalent and xerophytic plants. The area around the town is mostly covered by deciduous forests. The prevailing tree species are oak and hornbeam. Subalpine and alpine flora is represented by Gramieae, Poaceae Papilionacenae and Cyperaceae (feather-grass, brome-grass, cereals, sedge). The vegetation period is short. high humidity contributes to humus formation. Currently there are about 877 described plant species from 4 classes (Equisetophyta, Polipodiophyta, Pinophyta, Magnoliophyta), 57 families and 33 genera. The analysis of the local plant species confirmed that these include 4 Caucasian endemic and 2 Armenian endemic species. The habitats of the fauna in the area around the city include forests, sub-alpine and alpine zones with their characteristic flora. According to Dahl (1954) this area is a home to 2 described amphibia, 8 reptile, 52 bird and 16 mammal species. Deciduous forests are predominantly inhabited by small rodents; there are also bears, roes, wildcats, bats and other animals.

== Demographics ==
According to 2001 census, the population of Kajaran was 8439. Men comprise 48%, women 52% of the population. According to the municipality data, the unemployment rate is 8.3%, of which 85% are women and 15% are men. There are 700 job seekers, which comprise 14% of the total labour force. The high level of female unemployment is due to the closure of weaving, relay and condenser manufacturing facilities, which used to employ the majority of women in the city.

Insufficient supply of housing in residential blocks forces the population to purchase apartments outside Kajaran, in the nearby communities. The influx of job seekers also creates pressure on the housing market. There are 120 people registered as job seekers in the need of housing.

The people in Kajaran belong to the Armenian Apostolic Church. The town's only church is the Holy Mother of God built in 1912. It is under the jurisdiction of the Diocese of Syunik based in Goris.

The healthcare is served by the Kajaran medical center opened in 2013.

Historical population
Year	Pop.	±% p.a.
1831	50	—
1897	394	+3.18%
1926	431	+0.31%
1939	548	+1.86%
1959	11,527	+16.45%
1980	8,967	−1.19%
1989	7,519	−1.94%
2001	8,439	+0.97%
2011	7,163	−1.63%
2022	6,355	−1.08%

== Culture ==
The Bronze Age fort of Napat dating back to the 2nd millennium BC is found 4 km west of Kajaran. A medieval cemetery is found at the eastern edge of the town. Kajaran has a small church built in 1912 on the foundations of a medieval church.

The municipality of Kajaran runs a cultural centre, a public library, as well as an art school for children.

== Economy ==
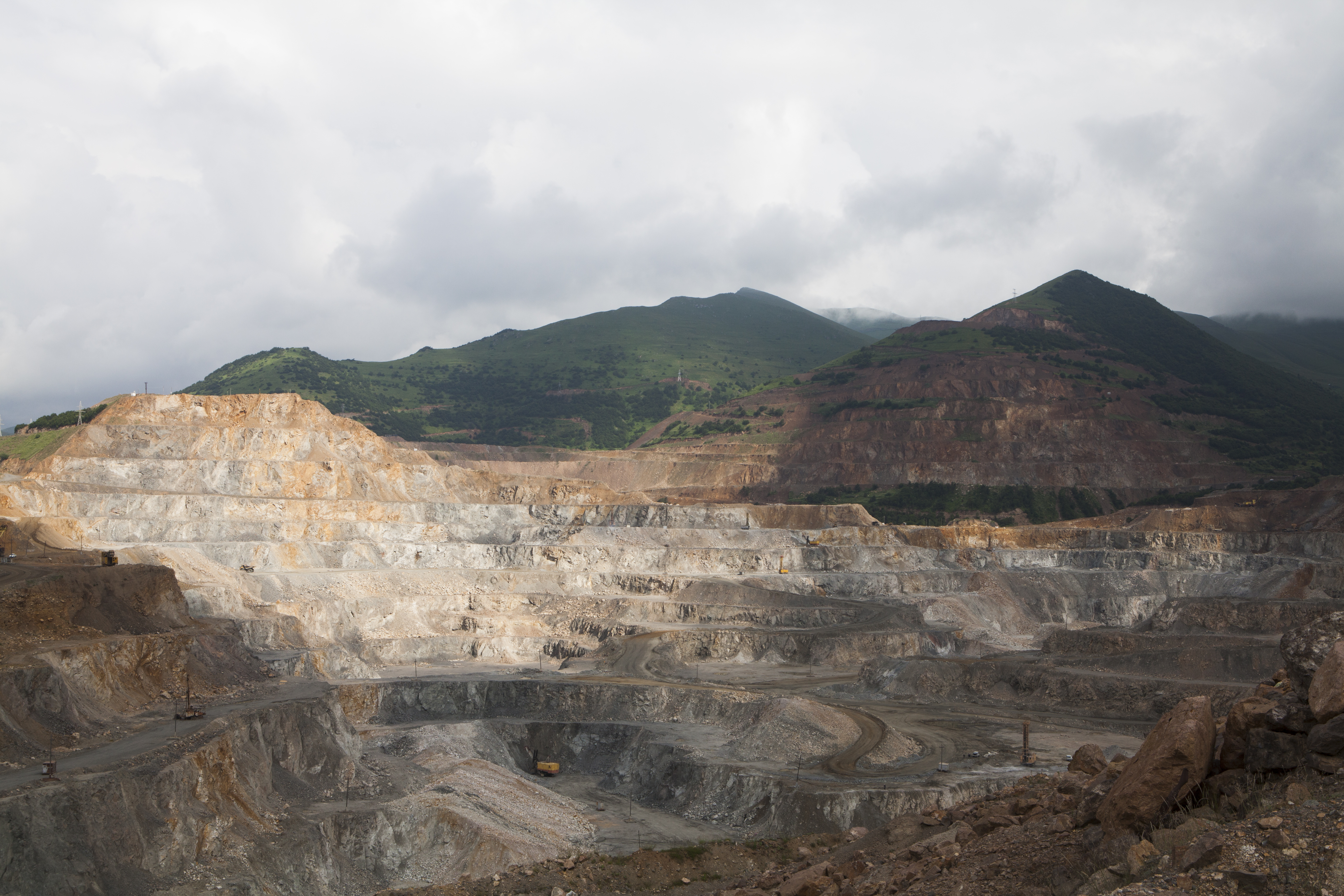
The Kajaran Mine operated by the Zangezur Copper and Molybdenum Combine

The key economic sector of the town is mining. Kajaran is home to the Zangezur Copper and Molybdenum Combine, operating since 1951. The plant initially used subsurface mining method; in 1959 it shifted to open-pit mining and used it in the central section of Kajaran molybdenum mine to extract ore and produce copper and molybdenum concentrates. The plant currently produces 10 million tons of concentrate annually. The copper concentrate is transported to Alaverdi metallurgical plant and Armenian Molybdenum Production company in Yerevan for further processing. Final treatment of molybdenum takes place at Yerevan Clear Iron Plant. The Copper-Molybdenum Plant employs 3800 people.

The labour market is rather lopsided. The industry sector employs 41% of the labor force. During the 1950s, people from Kapan, Goris and Nagorno Karabagh arrived in Kajaran in search of employment. There are 1120 retired citizens in Kajaran. The average pension size is AMD 12000. 94 households are beneficiaries of the family benefit system. There are 216 registered people with disabilities, including 19 with service-incurred disabilities and 64 with congenital disabilities.

== Education ==
As of 2017, Kajaran is home to 2 public education schools and 2 pre-school kindergartens. The town is also home to the Kajaran technical intermediate college.

Frequent awareness programs of ecology and environmental issues are presented by the municipality of Kajaran with the support of Zangezur Copper and Molybdenum plant.

== Sport ==
Kajaran has a sports school served by a football training field located at the centre of the town. The Zangezur Copper and Molybdenum plant who are the owners of FC Gandzasar representing the town of Kapan, are the sponsors of the sporting life in Kajaran.

== Notable people ==
- Vahe Hakobyan, Armenian politician
- Artak Davtyan, politician and economist

== See also ==
- Syunik (historic province)
- Zangezur Copper and Molybdenum Combine
