= Zangezur Copper and Molybdenum Combine =

Zangezur Copper-Molybdenum Combine (ZCMC) is the largest mining company in Armenia, headquartered in Kajaran. It operates the Kajaran mine, which covers 421 hectare area with reserves of 550 million tons of ore. The mine produces around 22 million tons of ore annually. ZCMC also employs around 4,500 people and become the highest taxpayer in 2025 for Armenia..

ZCMC began operations in 1951 and transitioned entirely to open-pit mining in 1962. The company was privatized in 2004 for $40 million, with Germany's CRONIMET Mining GmbH initially acquiring a 60% controlling stake that later grew to 75%. Following a series of share repurchases and shareholder transfers between 2017 and 2020, GeoProMining Gold acquired a 60% share's ownership in the company in 2021. tThe Government of Armenia holds a 21.875% share's ownership as a donation from GeoProMining Gold

== History ==
Zangezur Copper Molybdenum Combine (ZCMC) is the largest mining company in Armenia, located in Kajaran. It operates the Kajaran mine, which contains deposits of copper and molybdenum. It began from the first geological exploration of the site in the 1880s in the Kajaran mine and concluded in 1931. After the exploration, an enrichment plant was built in 1949. Then, it began its first production in 1951. Until 1954, the operation used exclusively underground mining techniques and shifted to use a hybrid technique which combined underground and open-pit mining. Since 1962, ZCMC has only used open-pit mining in its operations. In 1976, the Kajaran mine and plant in Kapan merged and became Zangezur Copper and Molybdenum Combine. However, they were separated, and Kajaran retained the name of ZCMC, while the enrichment plant named the Kapan Enrichment Plant.

== Ownership ==
In 2004, ZCMC was privatized for $40 million, even though at that time, the mine generationg profit of at least $10 million annualy. The company's share ownership was split with a 60% majority owned by CRONIMET Mining GmbH (Cronimet) and followed by the Plant of Pure Iron OJSC owning 15 % shareholder's ownership, and Armenian Molybdenum Production (AMP) and Zangezour Mining Ltd owning the same amount of shareholder's ownership at 12.5%.

After ten years, Cronimet increase its share ownership to 75 % by acquiring Plant of Pure Iron OJSC's share. In 2017, AMP’s ownership (previously held by Vahe Hakobyan and Karen Karapetyan) was transferred to Star Dust (owned by Avetik Hovikyan and Julietta Darchinyan), while Zangezur Mining was transferred to Moon Metals (owned by Armen Antikyan and Suren Atsikyan) before being acquired by Jean-Jacques Louis Paul Buffet from Walnort Finance Limited. In 2018, Mher Poloskov bought shares on 20 June 2018 in the amount of 7.5% of the company, and on the same date, Narek Ambaryan and Karen Hakobyan bought a 2.5% share each. The three of them are the beneficial owners behind AMP. In 2019, ZCMC bought all of the shares owned by Cronimet in the amount of 75% share ownership and planned to sell 12.5% to a German company. On March 27, 2020, Thomas Peter Heil from C2Capital GmbH bought 12.5% of the shares from the shares that were repurchased from Cronimet, and in the same year, on February 3, 2020, Mikhail Zurabov bought Walnort Finance Limited from Jean-Jacques Louis Paul Buffet. Since March 2022, GeoProMining Gold bought 60% share of the company and donate 15% of it to the government of Armenia.On 24 August 2022, GeoProMining Gold increased their donation by gifting 6.875% of its shares to government of Armenia.

== Operational ==
The mine covers an area of 421.2 hectares, which contains 550 million tons of ore reserves, and since 2016, the company has produced 22 million tons of ore annually. The company employed 4,500 employees and became one of the biggest employer in Syutnik region.It also became the biggest taxpayer in Armenia, paying 41.6 billion drams in 2025.
