= Vahe M. Hakobyan =

Armenian politician (born 1977)

Vahe Maximi Hakobyan (Armenian: Վահե Մաքսիմի Հակոբյան, born May 18, 1977) is an Armenian politician and businessman who formerly served as governor of Syunik Province (2013-2014) and as a member of the National Assembly of Armenia. He is a member of the Republican Party of Armenia and serves on the party council. While in parliament, he was a member of the Standing Committee on Financial-Credit, Budgetary and Economic Affairs. He was not a member of any parliamentary faction or deputy group.

He was born in Kajaran, Armenia. From 1994 to 1999, he studied at the Institute of National Economy, specializing in economics. In 1999, he was admitted to the post-graduate course at the Institute of Economic Research of the Ministry of Finance and Economy at RA. In 1999, he was the chairman of the board of the company AVSAP, Ltd. From 2000 to 2002, he worked as the Head of the Monitoring unit of the Monitoring and Audit Department of the Ministry of State Property Management of Armenia. In 2003 he defended a scientific thesis and received the degree of Candidate of Sciences in Economics. From 2003 to 2004 he worked as the executive director of Zangezur Mining Company.

He was elected to the National Assembly of Armenia in 2004, 2007, and 2012.
