= Battle of Shusha (2020) =

Battle in the Second Nagorno-Karabakh War

- Part of the Second Nagorno-Karabakh War
- Map of the battle as of 18 November 2020: Controlled by Artsakh Controlled by Azerbaijan Disputed
Date	6 November 2020 – 8 November 2020 (2 days)
Location	Shusha, Azerbaijan 39°45′36″N 46°44′51″E
Result	Azerbaijani victory: Stepanakert–Goris highway cut off; Ceasefire agreement
Territorial changes	Azerbaijan takes control of Shusha

Belligerents
Azerbaijan (Syrian opposition) Syrian mercenaries	Artsakh; Armenia

Commanders and leaders
Hikmat Mirzayev; Kanan Seyidov; Zaur Javanshir; Tehran Mansimov; Gunduz Safarli	Seyran Ohanyan (Note: Although the Armenian and Artsakh military authorities credited Seyran Ohanyan for being the commander of the Armenian forces in Shusha, Ohanyan himself stated he only led a detachment of 16 men during the battle.); Hovhannes Avagyan †; Argishti Kyaramyan; Artur Vanetsyan

Units involved
Azerbaijani Armed Forces: Special Forces; Ministry of Internal Affairs: Internal Troops	Artsakh Defence Army; Armed Forces of Armenia: Homeland detachment; National Security Service; Police of Armenia

Strength
Per Azerbaijan: 400 soldiers of the Special Forces; Per other sources: Unspecified inside city, 6,000 in surrounding area (Note: Neither Armenia, nor Artsakh had specified how many Azerbaijani soldiers were in the city during the battle. However, President of Artsakh, Arayik Harutyunyan, after the ceasefire agreement, had stated that about 6,000 Azerbaijani soldiers were sent to the area. 5,784 medals were awarded to Azerbaijan servicemen by President Aliyev for their actions in and around Shusha.)	Per Armenia and Artsakh: Unspecified; Per Azerbaijan: 2,000+ servicemen

Casualties and losses
Per Azerbaijan: 356 servicemen killed (entire operation); Per Armenia and Artsakh: Unspecified (Note: Neither Armenia, nor Artsakh had specified how many Azerbaijani soldiers were killed in the city during the battle. However, the Artsakh authorities, on 30 October, claimed that about 200 Azerbaijani soldiers were killed near Shusha.)	Per Armenia: 300+ servicemen killed; Per Artsakh: 150+ servicemen killed; 1 police officer wounded; Hundreds of servicemen missing; Per Azerbaijan: 1,500+ servicemen killed
- 2,000+ servicemen killed in total (per Russia); ~4,500 Armenians displaced (per Artsakh)

The Battle of Shusha (Note: • Referred to by Armenia as the Loss of Shushi (Armenian: Շուշիի կորուստը, romanized: Shushii korusty). • Referred to by Azerbaijan as the Liberation of Shusha (Azerbaijani: Şuşanın azad edilməsi), the Salvation of Shusha (Azerbaijani: Şuşanın qurtuluşu), and the Shusha Operation (Azerbaijani: Şuşa əməliyyatı).) (Azerbaijani: Şuşa döyüşü or Şuşa uğrunda döyüş; Armenian: Շուշիի ճակատամարտ, romanized: Shushii chakatamart) was the final and decisive battle of the Second Nagorno-Karabakh War, fought between the armed forces of Azerbaijan and the self-proclaimed Republic of Artsakh, militarily supported by Armenia, over the control of the city of Shusha. The battle is considered one of the bloodiest battles of the war.

Shusha, known to Armenians as Shushi, and the surrounding mountainous terrain, is one of the most strategically important locations in the disputed Nagorno-Karabakh region, and is usually referred to as the "beating heart" of the region. Until the middle of the 19th century, the city was considered the cultural and political centre of the regional Azerbaijani population, as well as one of the two main cities of the Transcaucasus for Armenians and the center of a self-governing Armenian principality from medieval times through the 1750s.

The city had a mixed Armenian-Azerbaijani population until the Shusha massacre in 1920, when Azerbaijani forces destroyed the Armenian half of the city and killed or expelled its Armenian population— from 500 to 20,000 people. Since the massacre left the city predominantly Azerbaijani, it was thereafter incorporated into the Azerbaijani SSR, along with the rest of the Nagorno-Karabakh Autonomous Oblast. The city was captured in 1992 by Armenian Armed Forces to lift the Siege of Stepanakert during the First Nagorno-Karabakh War, and its then-predominantly-Azerbaijani population was expelled from it. The city subsequently served as a defensive backbone within Artsakh, connecting the de facto capital, Stepanakert, to the town of Goris in Armenia via the Lachin corridor.

Advancing from the city of Jabrayil, the Azerbaijani military captured the town of Hadrut in mid-October. The Azerbaijani forces then advanced further north, entering Shusha District through its forests and mountain passes. Although Shusha had been under bombardment since the beginning of the conflict, local warfare erupted near the city on 29 October. Azerbaijan seized control of the village of Chanakchi, followed by part of the strategic Shusha–Lachin road on 4 November, with the Armenian forces subsequently closing the road to civilians. Le Monde reported that the battle had turned in favour of Azerbaijan on 6 November, despite Artsakh's denial.

Supported by artillery fire, Azerbaijani special forces entered Shusha on 6 November. After two days of battle, the Armenian forces were driven out of the city, and on 8 November, the President of Azerbaijan, Ilham Aliyev, stated that Azerbaijani forces had taken control of Shusha; Armenia issued a denial. The next day, the Azerbaijani Ministry of Defence released a video from the city, confirming full Azerbaijani control. On the same day, the Artsakh's Presidential Office confirmed that it had lost control of Shusha, although this was later contradicted by statements from the Armenian prime minister Nikol Pashinyan, and the Armenian Ministry of Defence. Following the signing of a ceasefire agreement, President of Artsakh, Arayik Harutyunyan reiterated that Artsakh had lost control of the city on 7 November, and Pashinyan admitted to the loss of the city. Due to the strategic advantage the city provided, the capture of Shusha became a decisive moment in the war, with Azerbaijan declaring victory a few days later.

Azerbaijan's victory in Shusha was widely celebrated in Azerbaijani society and its diaspora. 8 November, the day the President of Azerbaijan announced the victory of the Azerbaijani forces, was declared Victory Day in Azerbaijan, and a future Baku Metro station was named "8 November". A military award was created for those who took part in the battle. The name of Nobel Avenue in Baku has been changed to "8 November" Avenue.

== Background ==
Shusha was the second-largest city in the Nagorno-Karabakh region prior to the 2020 war. It is de jure part of the Shusha District of Azerbaijan, although it had been controlled by the unrecognised Republic of Artsakh since the end of the First Nagorno-Karabakh War in 1994, as part of its Shushi Province. The city is located at an altitude of 1,300 to 1,600 meters (4,300 to 5,200 ft) above sea level, about 15 kilometres (9.3 mi) from the regional capital Stepanakert, referred to by the Azerbaijanis as Khankendi. The two settlements are separated by a valley, and Shusha, which serves as a buffer zone for Stepanakert, and is situated in mountainous terrain overlooking the region, has been described as a "strategic height from where one could keep all Nagorno-Karabakh under control". The strategic hilltop town is popularly referred to as an "unassailable" mountain fortress by both the Armenians and the Azerbaijanis. A key road connecting Goris in Syunik Province, southern Armenia, to Stepanakert passes through the Lachin corridor via Shusha; the only other major road connecting Armenia to Nagorno-Karabakh passes through the Murovdağ mountains in the northern Kalbajar District.

A map of Azerbaijan showing Shusha's location

Directly prior to the Armenian-Azerbaijani War of 1918–1920, Armenians formed a slight majority in the town. However, the town was left with a predominantly Azerbaijani majority after the war, as the Armenian population was massacred and the Armenian half of the city was razed during Shusha massacre. Subsequently, in 1923, under the Soviet rule, the Nagorno-Karabakh Autonomous Oblast (NKAO) was created, and Shusha was the only large settlement with an Azerbaijani majority to be incorporated into the oblast.

In February 1988, the government of the Armenian-majority NKAO voted in favour of seceding from Azerbaijan and unifying with Armenia, leading to a wider ethnic and territorial conflict between the Armenians and the Azerbaijanis living in the Soviet Union. After the Soviet Union collapsed in 1991, the Armenians and the Azerbaijanis vied to take control of Nagorno Karabakh and the fighting had escalated into full-scale warfare by early 1992. By then, the enclave had declared its independence and set up an unrecognised government. Beginning in late 1991, Shusha became used by Azerbaijani forces as a base for daily indiscriminate rocket attacks onto the regional capital of Stepanakert during the Siege of Stepanakert, causing at least 169 civilian deaths. On 8 May 1992, the Armenian forces launched successful offensive to capture Shusha in order to break the siege, and its Azerbaijani population of about 15,000 people, which made up 85.5% of the city's population in 1979, was forced to flee. Most of the city came into ruins, and Shusha turned into a ghost town. The ethnic Armenians, most of whom were the ones who fled anti-Armenian pogroms in Baku and other cities of Azerbaijan, then settled in the city, with about five thousand people living in Shusha prior to the battle in 2020. In 2020, the de facto President of Artsakh, Arayik Harutyunyan announced plans to move the National Assembly of Artsakh to Shusha, which escalated the tensions between Armenia and Azerbaijan.

The city has historical, political and cultural importance for both the Armenians and the Azerbaijanis. For Armenians, Shusha has served as a town and ancient fortress for Armenian principality of Varanda during the Middle Ages and through the 18th century. It was one of the two main Armenian cities of the Transcaucasus and the center of a self-governing Armenian principality, the Melikdoms of Karabakh, from medieval times through the 1750s. It also has religious significance to the Armenians, as the Ghazanchetsots Cathedral is located in the city, and was the seat of the Diocese of Artsakh of the Armenian Apostolic Church until the end of the war.

For Azerbaijanis, the city holds particular cultural significance, who consider the city to their cultural capital in the region, and regard it as more important than Stepanakert. Through history, the city was a home to many Azerbaijani intellectuals, poets, writers and especially, musicians (e.g., the ashiks, mugham singers, kobuz players). Thus, Shusha is often considered the cradle of Azerbaijan's music and poetry and one of the leading centres of the Azerbaijani culture.

The President of Azerbaijan, Ilham Aliyev, had frequently described retaking the city as one of the war's key objectives. In a 16 October interview with the Turkish television, Aliyev said that "without Shusha, our cause will be unfinished", while the self-declared Armenian President of Artsakh, Arayik Harutyunyan, called Shusha "one of our greatest legacies we have inherited from our ancestors", and added that "who controls Shushi, controls Artsakh". Despite the symbolic importance of the town, the International Crisis Group's Azerbaijani analyst Zaur Shiriyev stated that it remained unclear whether the capture of Shusha was a military or political target, while according to the Azerbaijani political analyst Fuad Shahbazov, the victory of Azerbaijani forces in Shusha would be "perceived as a moral victory for Azerbaijanis, whether they are on the front or not", which will also lead to "serious demoralization" among Armenian soldiers, and according to International Crisis Group's senior analyst Olesya Vartanyan, the side that controlled Shusha had "automatically gained control over Stepanakert".

== Prelude ==
On 27 September 2020, an Azerbaijani offensive marked the beginning of clashes in the disputed Nagorno-Karabakh region, which is de facto controlled by the self-proclaimed and unrecognized Republic of Artsakh, but de jure part of Azerbaijan. The Azerbaijani forces first advanced in Fuzuli and Jabrayil districts, taking their respective administrative centres. From there, they proceeded towards Hadrut. The Armenian forces planned to hold out long enough until winter brought the Azerbaijani offensive, and especially its aerial operations to a standstill, buying time for international pressure to propel the Azerbaijani leadership to abandon its offensive. But after the fall of Hadrut around 15 October, the Azerbaijani troops began to advance more intensively, and the Armenians started to retreat, with the Azerbaijanis then taking control of Zangilan. Launching an offensive for Lachin, the Azerbaijani forces also pivoted their war effort towards Shusha, penetrating into Shusha District through its forests and mountain passes.

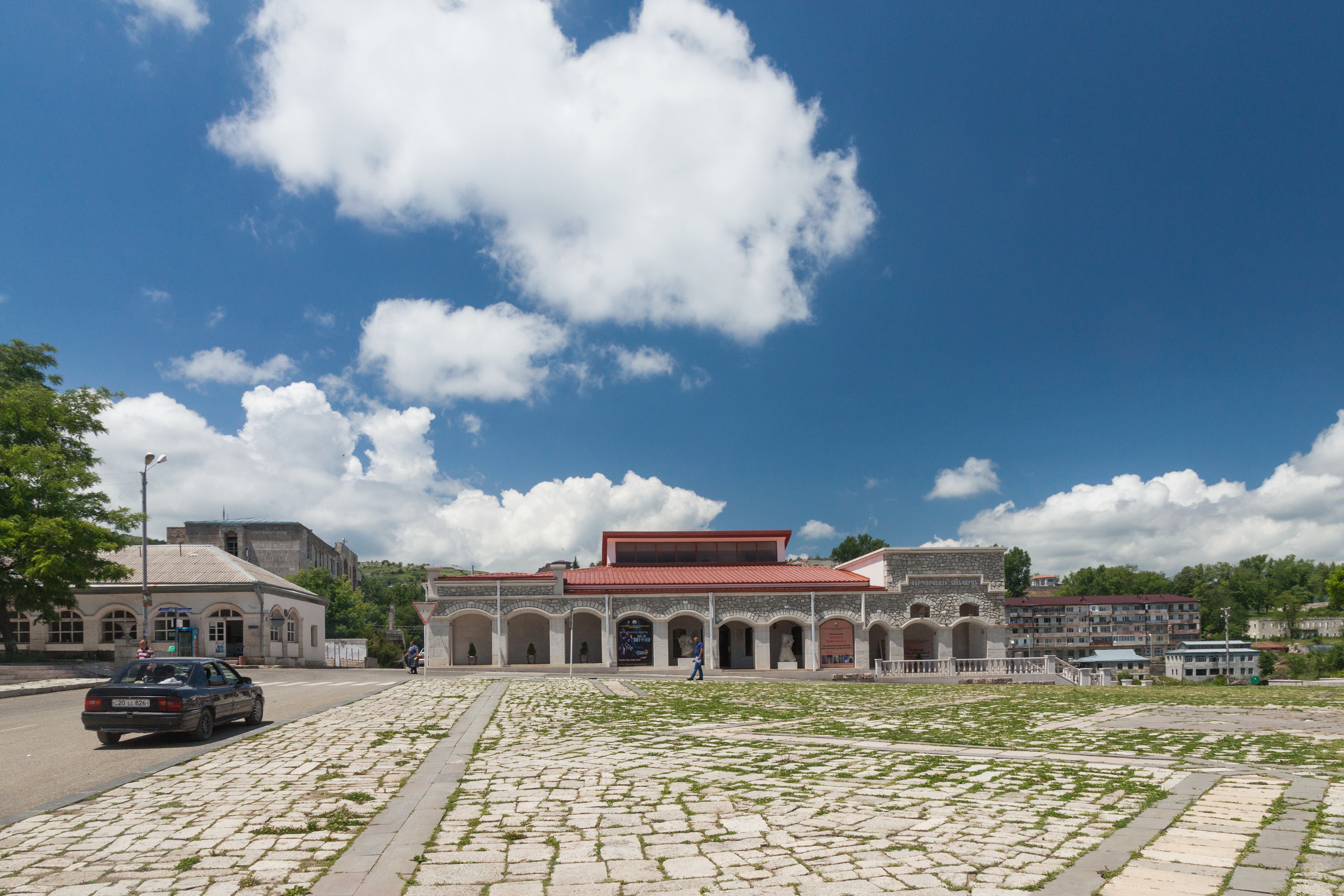
Shusha city square in 2014.

Shusha had been under sporadic artillery fire since the beginning of the war. Novaya Gazeta reported that on 4 October, the Azerbaijani forces had rocketed the House of Culture in Shusha, where, according to local residents, hundreds of military and police officers were present. Later on, the local Armenian media reported that more than 22 police officers were killed, and about 200 more were injured during the attack. The New York Times also reported that the building was damaged. On 8 October, Ghazanchetsots Cathedral in the city came under bombardment, reportedly by Azerbaijan, and was seriously damaged; Azerbaijan denied any responsibility. Throughout October, reports emerged that Shusha, as well as villages nearby, were being rocketed and shelled by Azerbaijani forces, while Azerbaijan denied shelling the city. On 28 October, Artsakh authorities stated that the situation in Chanakchi, located several kilometres south-east of Shusha, was "tense". The next day, Armenian Ministry of Defence stated that clashes were taking place in the village, and the self-proclaimed President of Artsakh, Arayik Harutyunyan, stated that the Azerbaijani forces were already 5 kilometres (3.1 mi) from Shusha. On 30 October, clashes were reported to have erupted near Shusha. On the same day, an Abkhazian Network News Agency correspondent reported that large explosions were heard near the city. The next day, Artsakh authorities stated that Shusha had again come under bombardment. On 2 November, the Armenian authorities stated that fierce clashes were taking place near Shusha.

Before the battle, in late October and early November, both Armenia and Azerbaijan accused each other of using white phosphorus near Shusha. On 30 October, Artsakh authorities had accused the Azerbaijani military of using phosphorus to burn forests near Shusha; Azerbaijan issued a denial. On 20 November, Prosecutor General's Office of Azerbaijan filed a lawsuit, accusing the Armenian Armed Forces of using chemical munitions to "inflict large-scale and long-term harm to the environment" around Shusha, while Azerbaijani authorities had also stated that the Armenian forces were transporting white phosphorus into the region. The use of white phosphorus is strictly regulated under an international agreement that neither Armenia nor Azerbaijan had signed.

== Battle ==
According to the Azerbaijani accounts, the Azerbaijani special forces, who were tens of kilometers (miles) away from the main Azerbaijani forces in Hadrut, continued on foot towards Shusha for five days, as both the terrain and the route were not suitable for vehicles. Choosing to move through the forests, they had avoided the Lachin corridor and Qirmizi Bazar, which was heavily defended by the Armenian forces. This was reiterated by the Azerbaijani president Ilham Aliyev later on, who stated that the Azerbaijani forces had crossed the ravines, forests and mountains to reach the city. On 4 November, the Armenian authorities reported that clashes continued near Shusha. This saw Azerbaijan capture the mountains south of Shusha, as well as make progress into the Lachin corridor.

Subsequently, the Armenian forces closed the Shusha–Lachin road to civilians, trapping 80 journalists within the enclave, according to Reporters Without Borders. The Armenian authorities stated that Shusha was heavily shelled on the morning of 5 November, and that clashes continued the following day. The Russian media reported that the Azerbaijani forces had managed to surround the city from three sides–the south, west, and east. On 6 November, Le Monde reported that the battle had turned in favour of Azerbaijan, despite a denial by Artsakh. In the early morning, Argishti Kyaramyan, who had served as the head of the Armenian National Security Service (NSS) until October 2020, stating that his duties in the region were completely fulfilled, left Shusha. In the meanwhile, the Armenian military commander Seyran Ohanyan, who was leading a group of 16 men in the city, also left Shusha.

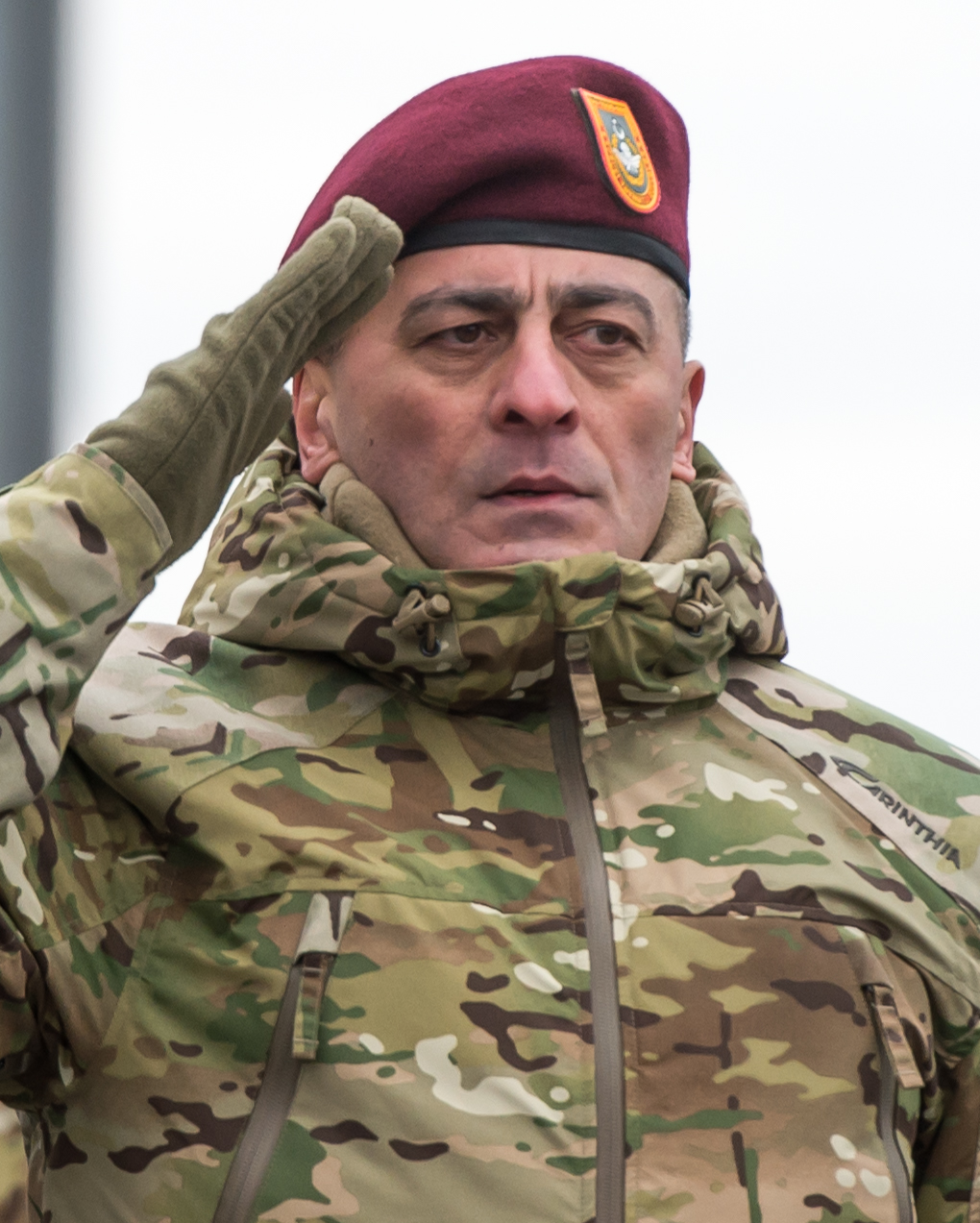
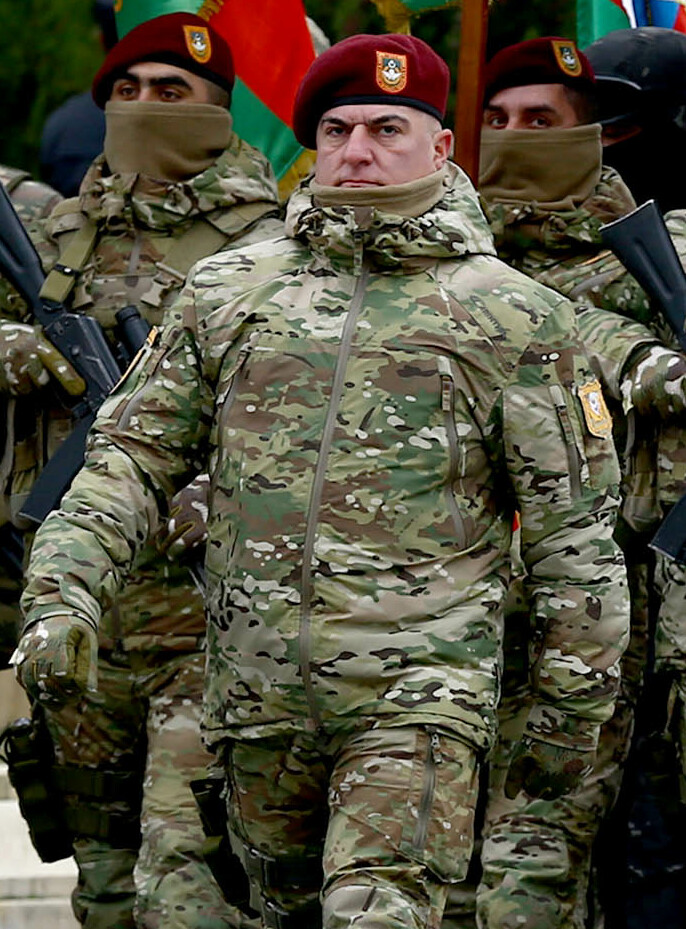
The Azerbaijani special forces were led by Hikmat Mirzayev (left), and Zaur Mammadov (right).

The next day, thousands of Armenians fled Shusha and neighbouring Stepanakert, with long lines of vehicles jamming the road. The Armenian artillery batteries were repositioned outside the city and local servicemen set up last-minute checkpoints to ensure no male resident under 58 was leaving. On 7 November, the Armenian authorities stated that fierce combat took place overnight near Shusha and Dashalty, and also claimed that several Azerbaijani attacks had been thwarted; Azerbaijan denied this, and its president, Ilham Aliyev, announced that the Azerbaijani forces had seized control of Garabulag and Baharly in Khojaly District, located to the southeast of the city.

The Azerbaijani forces entered the city on 6 November. In addition to artillery support, a group blocked the Lachin corridor to prevent the Armenian forces from bringing additional support to the city, while another group, after capturing Dashalty, provided fire support. Also, the Azerbaijani forces had destroyed a strategic bridge over the Hakari River, which allowed Armenia to move supplies and additional soldiers to the city, further breaking the supply lines crucial to the Armenian forces. An Abkhazian Network News Agency correspondent at scene reported that the Armenian forces in the city were supported with armoured vehicles, and that the technical superiority of the Azerbaijani forces was "gradually fading away" as the Azerbaijani forces were unable to use combat drones due to the foggy weather. The Azerbaijani accounts state that the Azerbaijani special forces, consisting of 400 men divided into four groups of 100, climbing the "steep rocks of Shusha with ropes" and lightly equipped, broke into the city in the morning from four sides and urban warfare immediately began. Azerbaijani forces used grenades and anti-tank missiles, as well as artillery support from outside the city, to combat the armoured vehicles of the over 2,000 Armenian defenders.

The next day, the Armenian forces were driven out of the city centre in the afternoon, and, according to the commander of the Nakhchivan branch of the Azerbaijani special forces, Tehran Mansimov, who took part in the battle, the Azerbaijani forces formed a defence line in the Shusha fortress. They thwarted three Armenian counterattacks, while the major Gunduz Safarli and his squad seized the building of the Shusha City Executive Power and continued building-by-building combat. Fighting along frontlines surrounding the city continued throughout the night. On the morning of 8 November, the Azerbaijani forces continued their offensive outside the city.

Aliyev, during his visit to Aghdam on 24 November, after the Armenian side handed it over to Azerbaijan as part of the ceasefire agreement, stated that in Shusha, the Azerbaijani forces were equipped with light weapons and engaged in combat in an "almost hand-to-hand battle." He reiterated this and added that the Azerbaijani soldiers had climb the cliffs of Shusha to reach the city during a victory parade in Baku held on 10 December, labeling the battle a "historic moment." The Azerbaijani accounts also suggested that the number of the Armenian forces in the city, supported by heavy artillery, was at least 2,000. While the Armenian sources and officials haven't commented on the number of the Armenian forces in Shusha during the battle, Artsakh's self-proclaimed president had stated that some 6,000 Azerbaijani soldiers were sent to the area before the battle. In the meanwhile, the Armenian media reported that the Armenian-allied forces had launched an Iskander missile on the city on 7 November, and some Armenian political figures reiterated this report, though in January 2021, the Armenian Mayor of Shusha, Artsvik Sargsyan, refuted this report, stating that there "would be no building standing in the city" if the report was true. In March 2021, the Azerbaijan National Agency for Mine Action (ANAMA) stated that Armenia had used Iskander missiles during the battle, adding that they found the remains of two exploded Iskander missiles during the demining of the area in Shusha.

In the afternoon of 8 November, Aliyev announced that the Azerbaijani forces had taken control of the city, also congratulating the commander of the Azerbaijani special forces, Hikmat Mirzayev. Although an Izvestia correspondent on scene confirmed Aliyev's claim, the Armenian authorities denied this on 8 and 9 November, stating that the fighting continued in and out of the city. On 9 November, the Azerbaijani Ministry of Defence released a video from the city, with a report by Major Zaur Rahimov in the end of it, confirming full Azerbaijani control. Aliyev also announced that the Azerbaijani forces had seized control of several villages to the south and east of the city, including Chanakchi, Signag, Shushakend, and Dashalty. The Azerbaijani media further reported that Mansimov had continued military operations and attacked the Armenian positions in Stepanakert, disobeying the orders of the higher command, though the Azerbaijani authorities and Mansimov himself denied this. Subsequently, the Artsakh authorities acknowledged that they had lost control of Shusha, adding that the Azerbaijani forces were closing in on Stepanakert. However, the Armenian prime minister Nikol Pashinyan appeared to contradict this, stating that the battle was continuing; this claim was later reiterated by the Armenian Ministry of Defence, and the Armenian MP Nikolai Baghdasaryan, who called Armenian public to not panic. Some Armenians speculated that the social network accounts of Artsakh officials were hacked and their statements did not correspond with the reality. Several Armenian officials and analysts also accused the Azerbaijani leadership of "lying to their people." However, on 10 November, following the signing of the ceasefire agreement, which confirmed the fact that the Azerbaijanis were controlling Shusha, Artsakh's self-proclaimed president, Harutyunyan, stated that his forces had lost control of the city on 7 November, and Pashinyan admitted the loss of the city.

== Casualties ==
In mid-November, the International Committee of the Red Cross (ICRC), assisted by the Russian peacekeeping forces, started to find and exchange the bodies of the fallen soldiers from both sides, and on 25 November, the Russian sources reported that, in the city, the ICRC had found more than 2,000 corpses in total.

=== Armenian ===
Armenia had not commented on its military casualties from the battle before the trilateral agreement. On 6 November, Le Monde reported that the hospitals in Stepanakert did not have enough space to accommodate any more injured during the battle for Shusha. Also, Reuters reported that the corpses of the Armenian soldiers were lining the stretches of a road in Shusha. On 7 November, allegations emerged that the Armenian military commander, Seyran Ohanyan, who was in Shusha during the battle, and his son, Arthur Ohanyan, were severely wounded, but this was denied by Armenia. The Azerbaijani media, citing military sources, claimed that more than 800 corpses of the Armenian soldiers have not been released into Armenian possessions. The Armenian Ministry of Defence had asked Azerbaijanis to transfer these corpses to the Armenian side. In an interview on 29 January 2021, the Azerbaijani commander Tehran Mansimov noted that the bodies of about 730 dead Armenian servicemen from Shusha, its environs and nearby forests were handed over to the Armenian side after the ceasefire agreement. However, on 16 November, self-declared President of Artsakh, Arayik Harutyunyan, stated that 150 bodies belonging to the Armenian forces were recovered from the outskirts of Shusha and hundreds were still missing, while the Armenian prime minister Nikol Pashinyan stated that over 300 bodies belonging to the Armenian forces were recovered from 14 to 16 November. On 21 November, Artsakh authorities stated that they had found a wounded Armenian police officer near the city.

=== Azerbaijani ===
Azerbaijan did not disclose its military casualties during the war. On 3 December, Azerbaijan's ministry of defence disclosed the total number of Azerbaijani servicemen killed throughout the war, and stated that it will provide the details later on. On 14 November, the Russian peacekeeping forces handed over the bodies of six Azerbaijani soldiers who were killed near Shusha to the Azerbaijani authorities. However, the Armenian authorities claimed that at least 200 Azerbaijani soldiers were killed in the vicinity of Shusha before the battle. The wounded Azerbaijani servicemen were taken to the nearby forests around the city, and were evacuated on November 9.

== Aftermath ==
=== Armenia ===
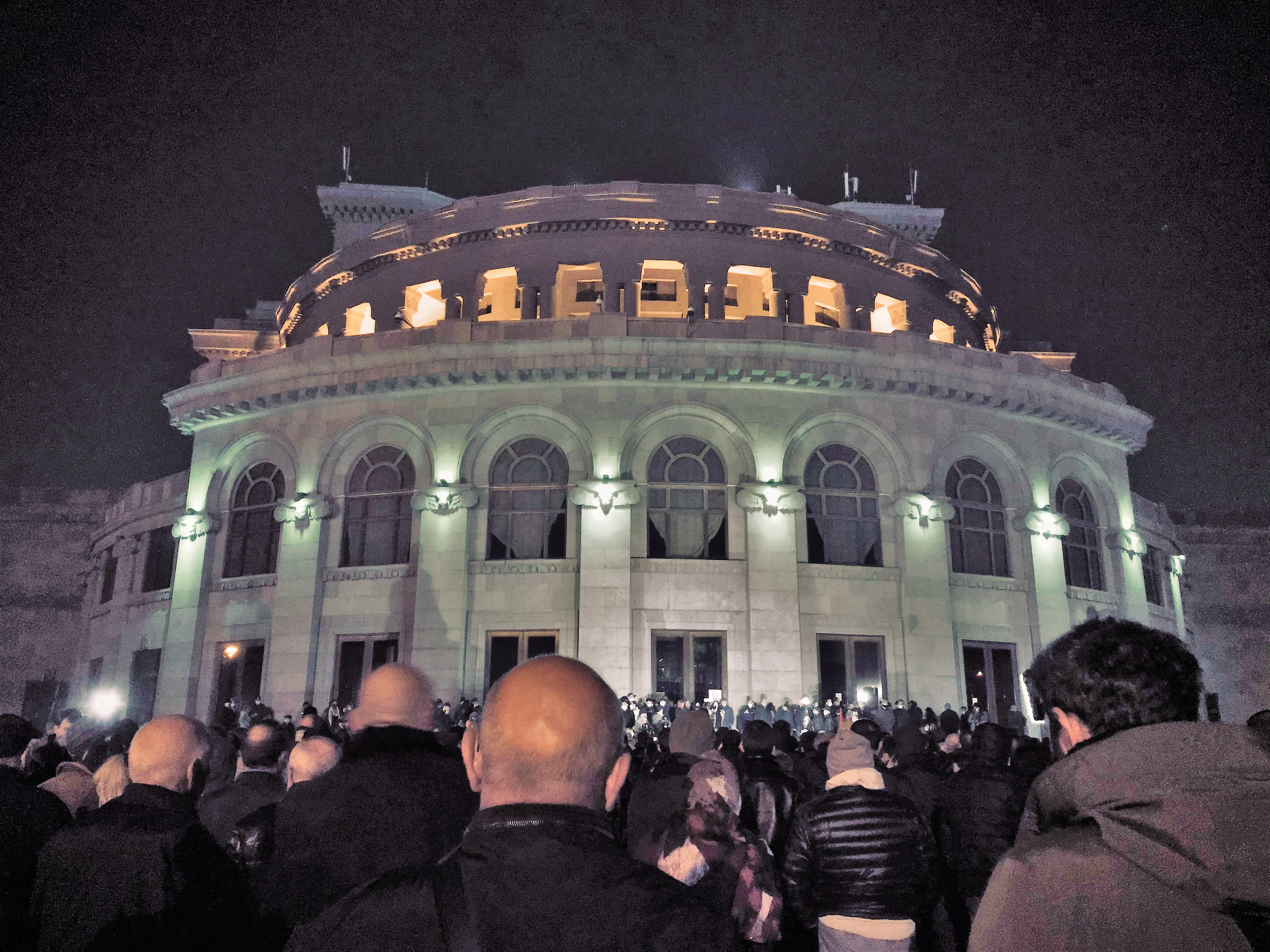
Protests in front of the Yerevan Opera Theatre on 18 November.

The battle was a key point in the Second Nagorno-Karabakh War and was seen as a significant blow by both the Armenian military and the wider Armenian society. The Armenian army started to disintegrate and two days after the battle, the Prime Minister of Armenia, Nikol Pashinyan, announced the signing of a ceasefire agreement with Azerbaijan. According to the Armenian political scientist Suren Sargsyan, the ramifications of Shusha's loss was difficult for the Armenians to grasp. Sargsyan added that it would lead to demands from the Armenian opposition for a change of government. In the aftermath of the war, many Armenians turned against Pashinyan, with violent protests erupting throughout the country, and a common claim of him "selling out" Shusha became popular among his opponents. Ex-president of Armenia, Robert Kocharyan, also criticised the Armenian military leadership for not stopping the Azerbaijani forces from reaching the vicinity of Shusha, as, according to Kocharyan, the Armenian forces had about two weeks to form up a new defensive line. Kocharyan also claimed that Vitaly Balasanyan, then the secretary of the National Security Council of the Republic of Artsakh, offered to command the Armenian forces in Shusha, but was rejected.

A series of military authorities backed Pashinyan, contending that Armenia's military position was much direr than many people believed. Pashinyan, in response, stated that after the Azerbaijani forces took control of Shusha, Stepanakert was left defenseless, and that twenty to thirty thousand Armenian soldiers in Askeran and Martuni would've been under siege, adding that the lives of the Armenian soldiers were more important for him. Artsakh's self-declared president, Arayik Harutyunyan, also pushed back against allegations of treason, stating that the ethnic Armenian forces lacked the manpower to defend the city. Then, the Russian president Vladimir Putin stated that when the Azerbaijani forces captured Shusha, a critical situation arose for the Armenians and that the Azerbaijanis could've further advanced, capturing Stepanakert, adding that the immediate cessation of the warfare was in the interest of the Armenian side. In the meanwhile, Putin also stated that Pashinyan had the opportunity to sign a ceasefire agreement with Azerbaijan in October, with the Armenian forces still controlling Shusha, though with the Azerbaijani refugees of the First Nagorno-Karabakh War returning to the city. Putin added that Pashinyan rejected this offer, which Pashinyan confirmed later on.

Pashinyan, in response to the allegations of Shusha being "sold out," stated that Shusha was an "unhappy and dull city," asking if the Armenians needed it or not, Then, in January 2021, at a meeting held by the Armenian government in the parliament, Pashinyan stated in response to a question from Naira Zohrabyan, a member of Prosperous Armenia, that "there was no option in the whole negotiation process to prevent the Azerbaijani refugees from returning to Shusha," adding that before the Armenian forces seized control of Shusha in 1992, "90% or more of the city's residents were Azerbaijanis." These statements created a resonance in the country, with political figures like Ara Abramyan, Aram Sargsyan, Mikayel Minasyan, Naira Zohrabyan, Robert Kocharyan, and Zaruhi Postanjyan, criticising Pashinyan. At a briefing, local journalists asked the MPs representing My Step Alliance, which is led by Pashinyan, whether or not they had "any doubts" of Shusha being "an Armenian city," though left the briefing without answering the question. On 29 January, a journalist protested Pashinyan's statement in front of the building of the Armenian government. Vice-president of the Armenian National Assembly, Alen Simonyan, stated that the local media had "misinterpreted" Pashinyan's statement and taken his words "out of context," adding that "provocations that exist in the media should be related to journalism." Pashinyan also responded to the public backlash via Facebook live, calling it a "media manipulation."

On 3 December 2020, Deputy Head of the Shushi Province, Samvel Harutyunyan, stated that about 4,500 Armenians were displaced from Shusha. Later, in January 2021, the Armenian Mayor of Shusha, Artsvik Sargsyan, stated that the Armenian refugees from Shusha, who "didn't know what was going on," and were thinking that they were "leaving for a few days, soon the issues would be resolved, and they would return to their homes," had faced with unfavourable living conditions, and high rent prices, as well as lack of food and clothing in Armenia despite the efforts of the charity organisations.

In January 2021, former director of the Armenian NSS, Argishti Kyaramyan, claimed that the members of the Homeland detachment, led by another former director of the NSS, Artur Vanetsyan, had left their positions during the battle, though Vanetsyan, and other members of the detachment later denied this claim.

=== Azerbaijan ===
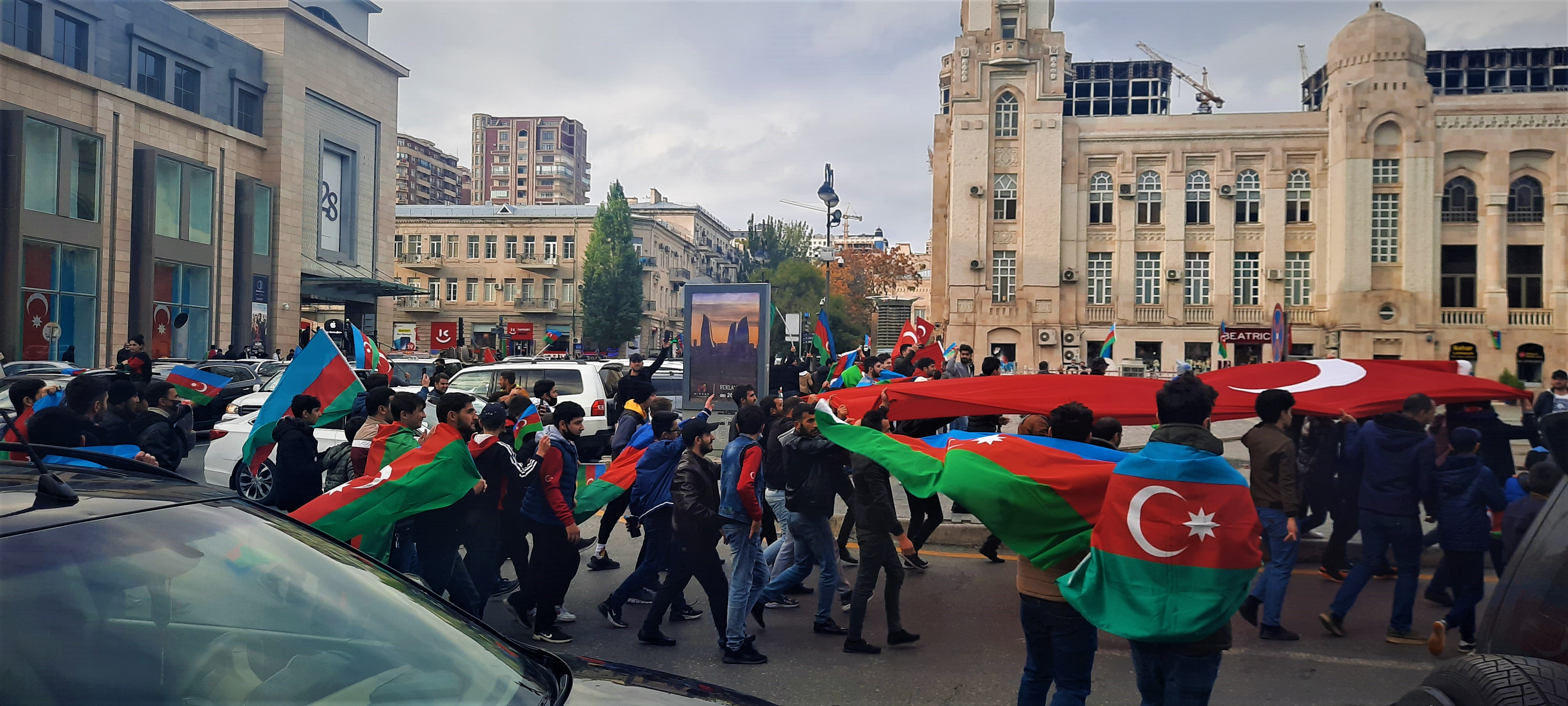
Celebrations in Baku, Azerbaijan on 8 November.

In contrast, the announcement of the city's capture by the Azerbaijani president Ilham Aliyev led to celebration among the Azerbaijanis, with flag-waving, singing, and the sounding of car horns in Baku, the country's capital. A wreath-laying ceremony took place at the Alley of Honor in Baku with the participation of Aliyev and the Vice President Mehriban Aliyeva. Ships moored in the Bay of Baku honked their horns, and the Azerbaijanis in Moscow celebrated with a firework display, while cars decorated with the flags of Azerbaijan and Turkey rallied through Brooklyn, New York. In Azerbaijan, some political figures labelled the battle the Divorce in the Mountains (Azerbaijani: Dağlarda boşanma), in reference to the Armenian name Operation Wedding in the Mountains (Armenian: «Հարսանիք լեռներում» ռազմագործողություն) for the 1992 capture of the city.

On 20 November, at a plenary session of the Azerbaijani National Assembly, a draft bill on amendments to the bill "On the establishment of orders and medals of the Republic of Azerbaijan" was submitted for discussion. The For the Liberation of Shusha Medal was established on the same day in the first reading in accordance with the bill on the occasion of Azerbaijan recording a victory in the battle and winning the war, with Ilham Aliyev proposing the medal's name. On 1 December, the Azerbaijani singer Samra Rahimli, known for representing Azerbaijan in Eurovision Song Contest 2016, released a song titled Shusha, we are back (Azerbaijani: Şuşa, biz qayıtmışıq). 27 September and 10 November were declared Remembrance Day and Victory Day respectively, although the latter's date was changed to 8 November as the previous date overlapped with Mustafa Kemal Atatürk's Memorial Day in Turkey.

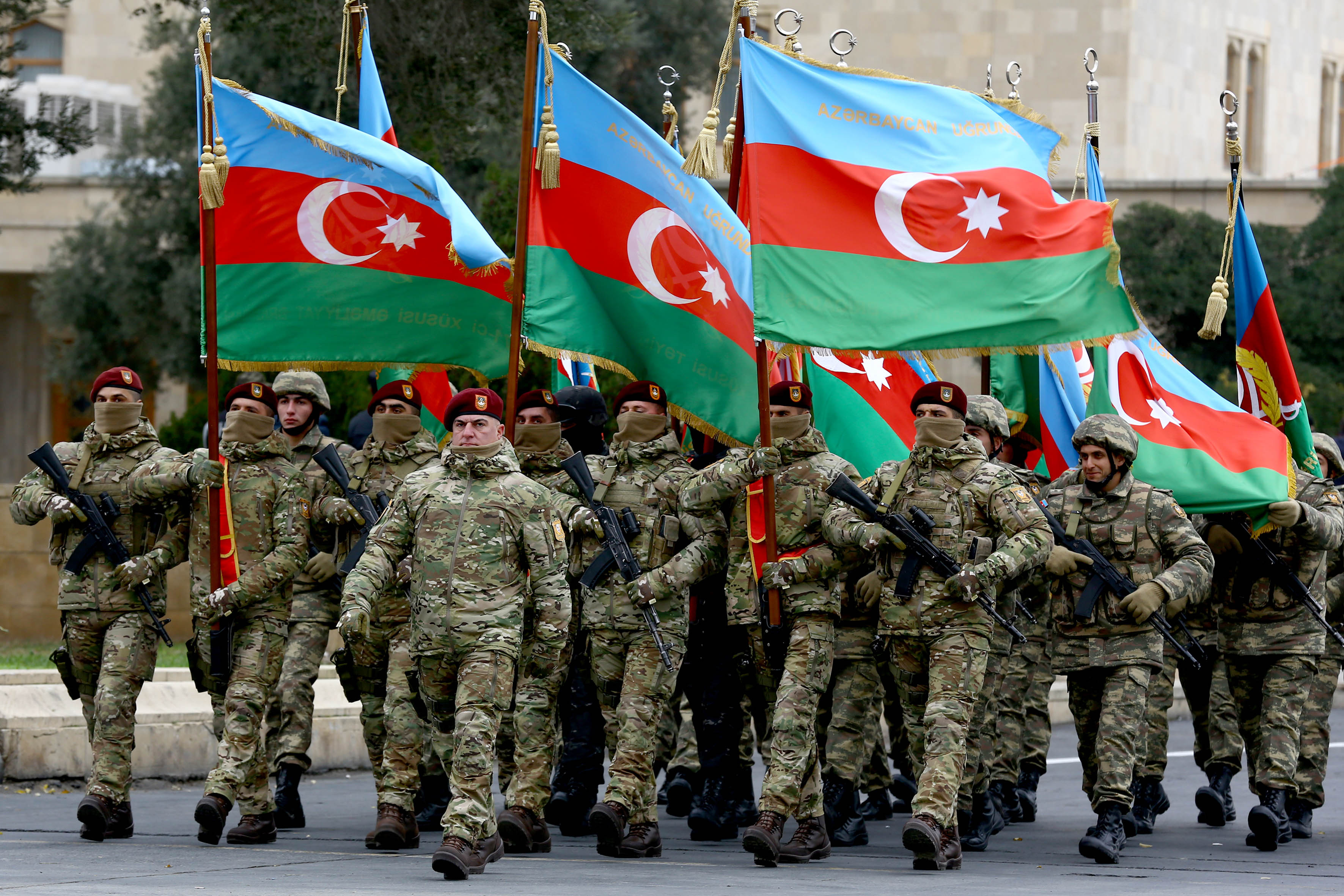
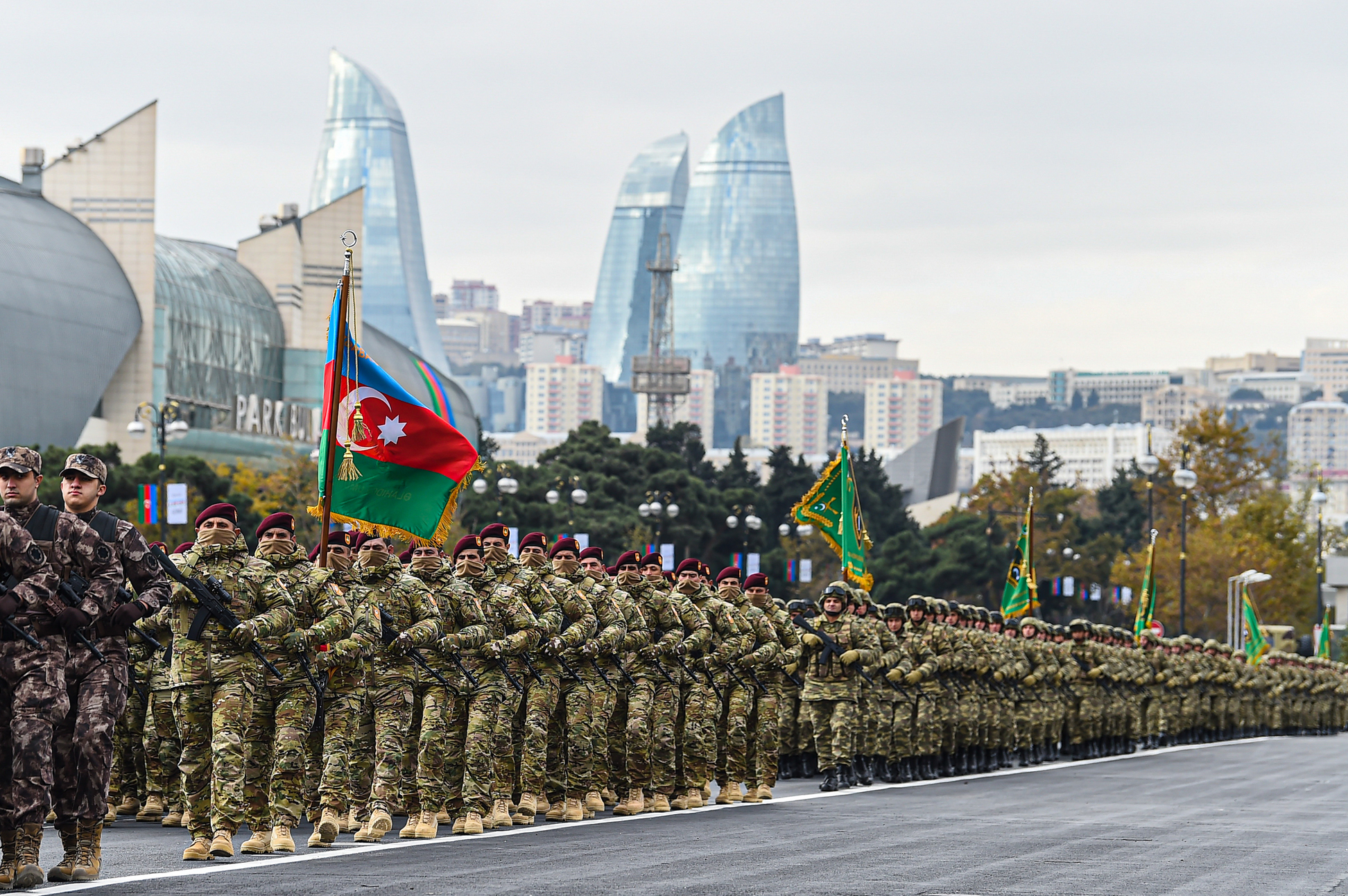
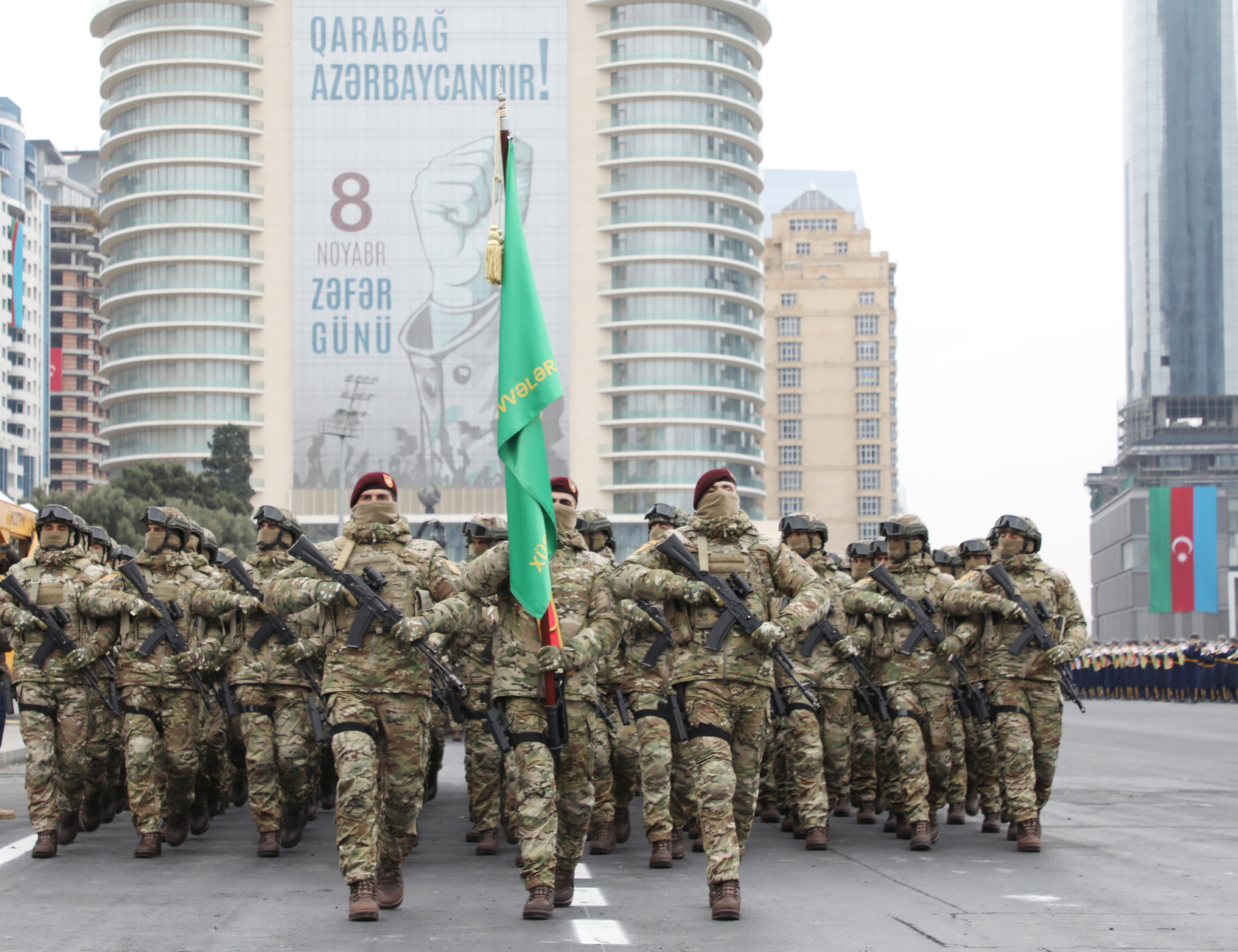
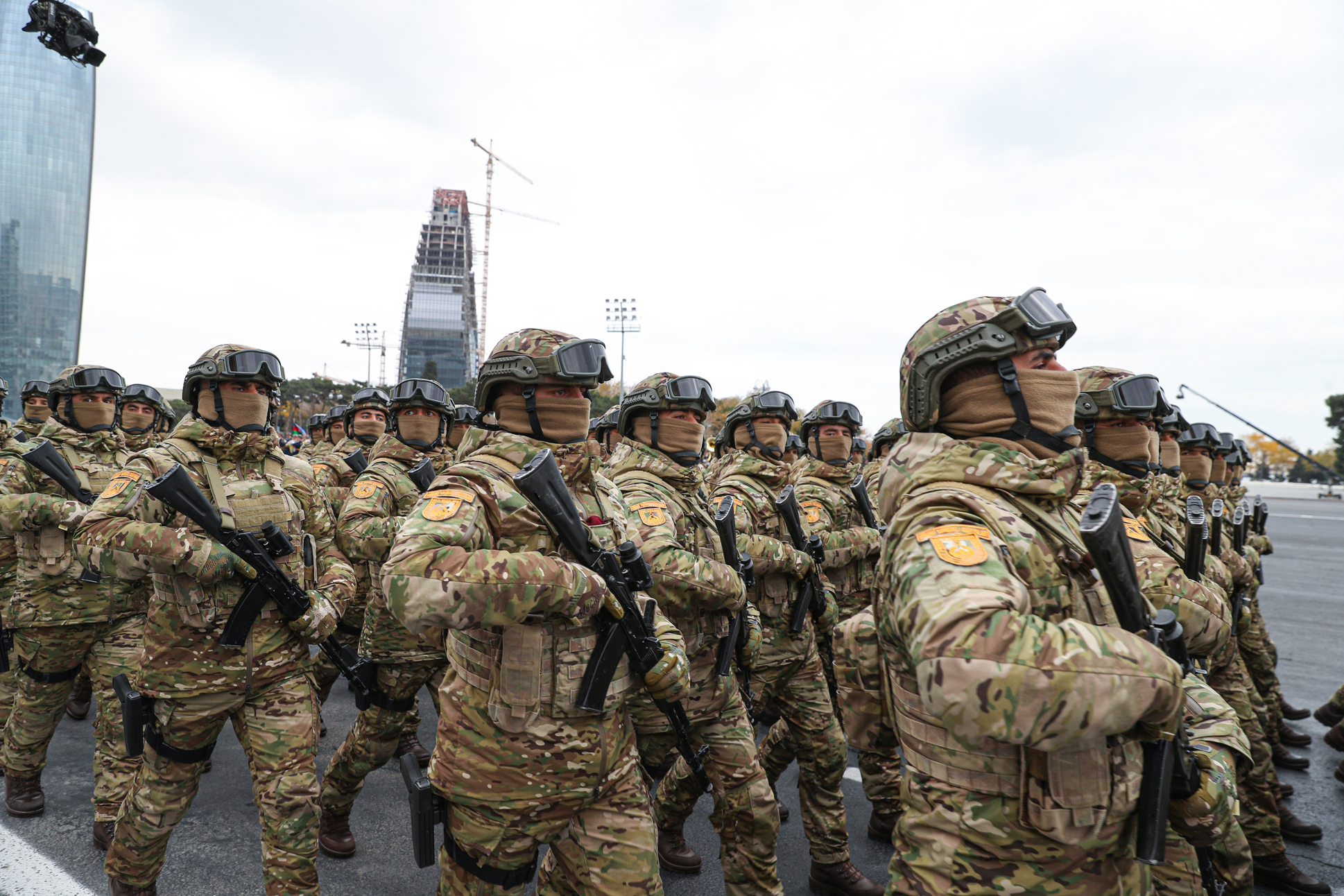
Azerbaijani servicemen who took part in the battle during a victory parade in Baku on 10 December 2020.

On 4 December, at 12:00 (GMT+4) local time, a moment of silence was held in Azerbaijan to commemorate the fallen soldiers of the war. In this regard, flags were lowered across the country, and traffic halted, while the ships moored in the Bay of Baku, as well as cars honked their horns. The Azerbaijani soldiers also stood in front of the Shusha fortress and commemorated those killed in the war. On 8 December, the Azerbaijani authorities announced that the new station in the Baku Metro will be named 8 November at the suggestion of the President Aliyev. On 10 December, during the Baku Victory Parade, the first flag hoisted in Shusha when the Azerbaijan forces seized the city's control was declared the Victory Banner of Azerbaijan in the war, which the personnel of the Azerbaijani Armed Forces, led by Zaur Mammadov, who also took part in the battle and was appointed the city's commandant, marched with it in Azadliq Square. Servicemen of the Special Forces of the Ministry of Defense, led by the Commander of the Special Forces, Lieutenant General Hikmat Mirzayev, who took part in the battle, also marched in the parade.

In November, the State Agency of Azerbaijan Automobile Roads started the construction of a four-lane highway to Shusha, labelled the "Victory Road", which begins in Alxanlı, and takes a route via Fuzuli, and the Topkhana Forest. A groundbreaking ceremony for the highway, which is planned to stretch 101 kilometres (63 mi) and be 37 metres (121 ft) wide, occurred on 24 November in the presence of the Azerbaijani president Ilham Aliyev, and the First-Vice President Mehriban Aliyeva. The road will also link up with the Baku–Shirvan–Saatly–Horadiz route. It is planned to get finished by September 2021. On 12 November, the Azerbaijani Ministry of Internal Affairs stated that it had moved the Shusha police department, which was previously located in Tartar District, into Shusha, while the organizers of the Turkvision Song Contest stated that they were exploring the possibility of holding the contest's 2021 version in Shusha, and in January 2021, the Azerbaijani Ministry of Culture started preparatory activities on the Khari Bulbul Festival and Days of the Poetry of Vagif. In December, the chairman of the Public Association Organization for the Protection of Historical and Cultural Monuments in the Occupied Territories of Azerbaijan, Faig Ismayilov, stated that the Azerbaijani refugees of the First Nagorno-Karabakh War from Shusha will start returning to the city at least by summer 2021, while the chairman of the Azerbaijani Community of Nagorno-Karabakh and the Azerbaijani MP, Tural Ganjaliyev, stated that they were planning to relocate the community to the city in the near future.

On 5 January 2021, Shusha was declared the cultural capital of Azerbaijan, while the Director General of the Islamic World Educational, Scientific and Cultural Organization (ICESCO), Salim Al-Malik, proposed to declare the city as the cultural capital of the Muslim world, and on 19 January, Secretary General of the Turkic Council, Baghdad Amreev, during a teleconference with President Aliyev, stated that Shusha will be declared the cultural capital of the Turkic world in 2022. On 15 January, the President Aliyev and the First-Vice President Aliyeva visited Shusha. The next day, busts of Khurshidbanu Natavan, Uzeyir Hajibeyov and Bulbul, which were kept in the yard of the National Art Museum in Baku since the Armenian forces captured Shusha in 1992, were returned to the city, while Aliyev hoisted the Azerbaijani flag in the city centre. On 27 January, Aliyev appointed Aydin Karimov as his special representative in the city.

=== Role of Russia ===
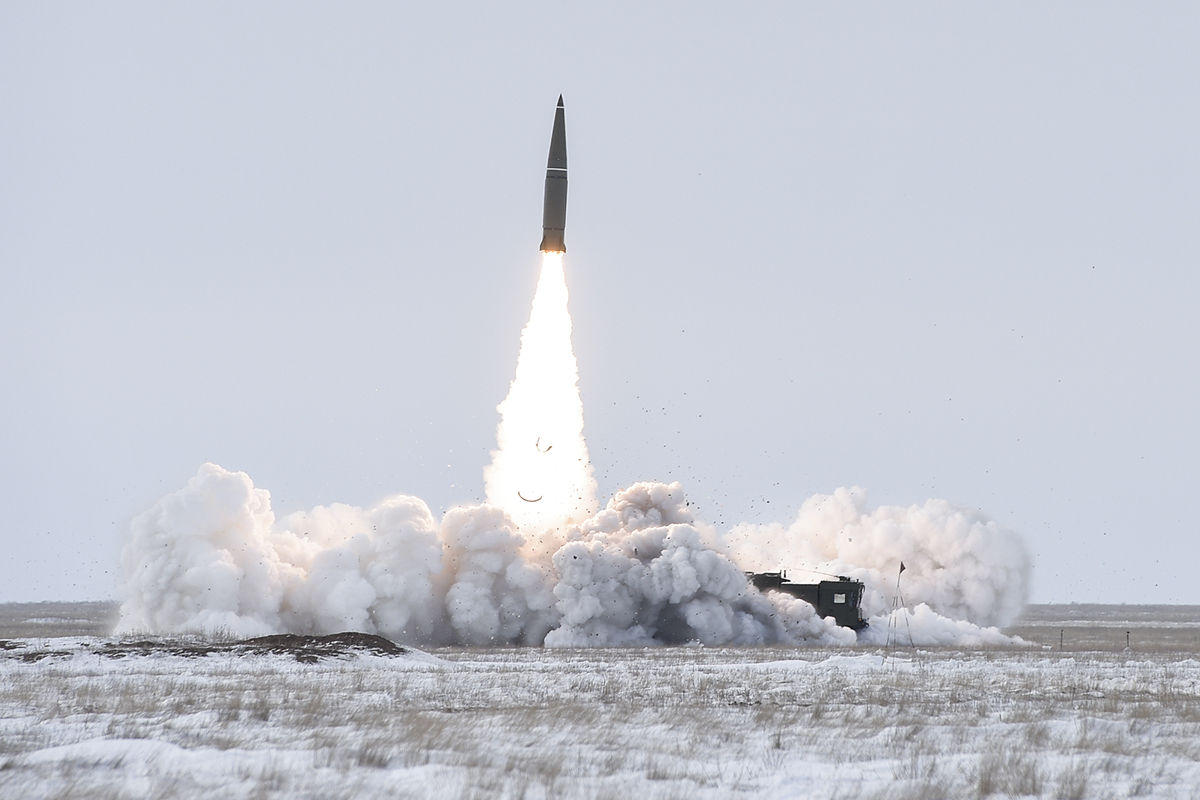
A Russian Iskander missile test launching in Kapustin Yar, 2018.

On 9 November, the day when the ceasefire agreement was signed, the Azerbaijani forces in Nakhchivan Autonomous Republic accidentally shot down a Russian Mil Mi-24 attack helicopter near Yeraskh, in Armenia. According to Anton Troianovski and Carlotta Gall of The New York Times, this potentially gave Russia a reason to intervene in the war, and the Russian president Vladimir Putin delivered an ultimatum to the Azerbaijani president Ilham Aliyev. According to Troianovski and Gall, in this ultimatum, Russia stated that if Azerbaijan did not cease its operations after seizing control of Shusha, it would intervene. The same night, an unknown missile hit an open area in Khyrdalan, near Baku, without causing any injuries, according to Azerbaijani sources. Also, yet again on the same day, a video emerged on the social media apparently showing the Armenian forces launching a Russian-made Iskander missile into Azerbaijan. The former Head of the Military Control Service of the Armenian MoD Movses Hakobyan, right after resigning from his post on 19 November 2020, confirmed the use of an Iskander missile on Azerbaijan by Armenia, though he did not say where the missile hit. According to Can Kasapoğlu, the Director of Security and Defence Studies Program at the Centre for Economics and Foreign Policy Studies, an Istanbul-based independent think tank, Armenia could've used Iskander missiles only with Russia's consent.

==== Wagner Group ====
On 28 September 2020, Russian media reported that Russian private military companies were ready to fight against Azerbaijan in Nagorno-Karabakh. On 1 October, Radio Free Europe/Radio Liberty, citing a Wagner Group source, claimed they were already in Nagorno-Karabakh and participating in hostilities. The Russian military analyst Pavel Felgenhauer also stated that Wagner contractors were sent to support the Armenian forces as ATGM operators. After the war, in December 2020, a photo of a Wagner mercenary, apparently taken in front a church in Shusha during the war, appeared on the internet. Also, the Russian media leaked a message, apparently describing how the Armenian government refused to pay the Russian mercenaries for their work, and how, because of this, some of the Wagner mercenaries intended to return to Russia or defect to the Azerbaijani side. The Russian media reported that, in November, there were about 500 Russian mercenaries fighting on the Armenian side, and some 300 Russian mercenaries had taken part in the Battle of Shusha, with Victor Zlobov, a retired captain of the Russian Armed Forces, stating that Shusha was "defended mainly thanks to the Russian volunteers."

The Russian businessman Yevgeny Prigozhin, who has been linked to the Wagner Group, denied any involvement of the Russian PMCs in the war. According to the Armenian journalist Karine Ghazaryan, writing for Bellingcat, there was no "any firm evidence showing their arrival or involvement in the war." She stated that Reverse Side of the Medal (RSOTM), a media channel linked to Wagner Group, which, according to Ghazaryan, was the main source of the reports, was not the "breaking news source."

==== Peacekeeping ====
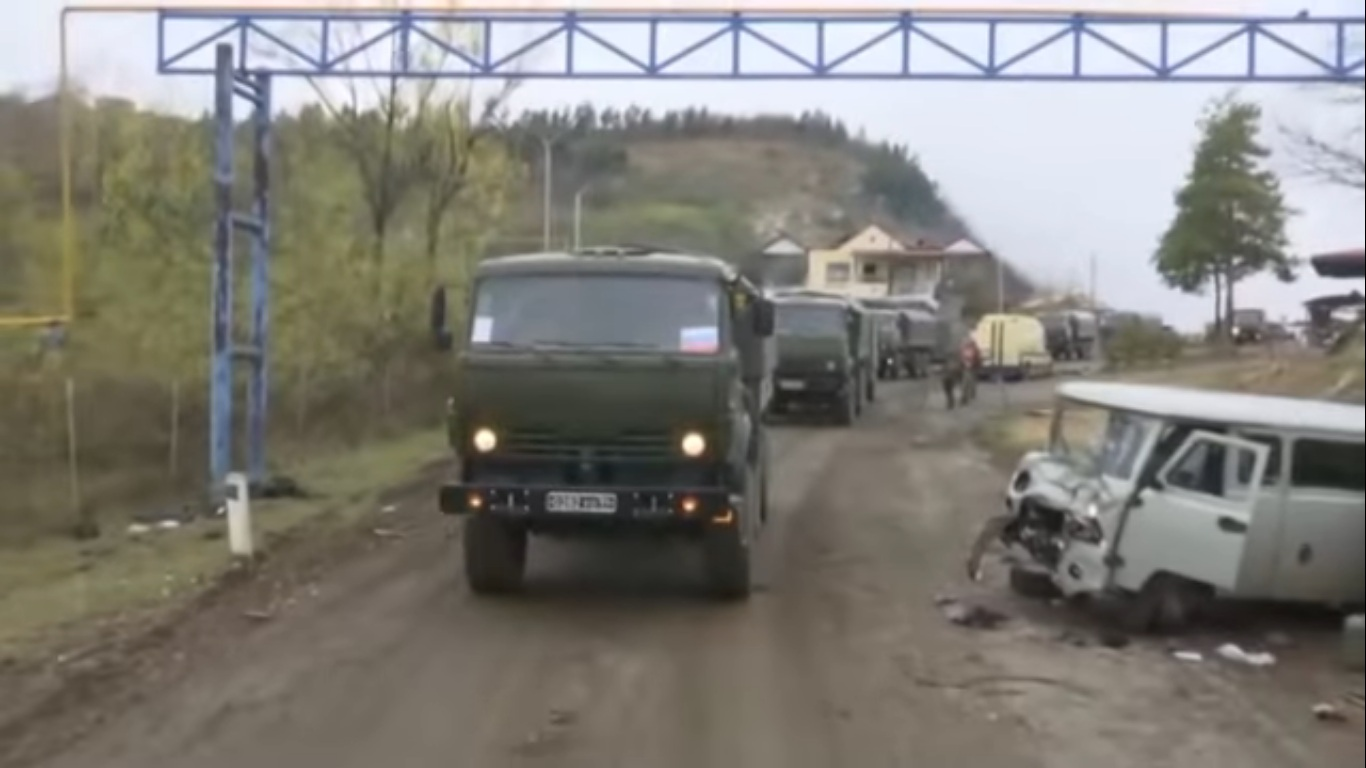
A convoy of Russian peacekeepers driving past an Azerbaijani checkpoint near Shusha.

On 13 November, following the ceasefire agreement, the Russian peacekeepers from the 15th Separate Motor Rifle Brigade deployed to the region set up an observation post on the outskirts of the city. The Russian peacekeeping forces also took control of the Lachin corridor, which, according to the statement, did not affect Shusha. A new road through the Lachin corridor is planned for construction, which will bypass Shusha, unlike the current road that runs along the city's outskirts. A checkpoint located at a road going through the Ganja Gate, the northern entrance to the city, was guarded by the Azerbaijani servicemen.

The first major breach of the ceasefire that was confirmed by the Russian peacekeeping forces in the region occurred on 11 December, in an area close to Shusha, which became an Artsakh holdout after the war. The Azerbaijani forces seized control of Hin Tagher (Köhnə Tağlar) on 12 December, with some clashes continuing in the area. Both sides accused each other of reigniting the conflict. The Russian peacekeeping forces requested both sides to respect the ceasefire. On 13 December, the Russian peacekeeping contingent took control of Hin Tagher. However, the next day, the Russian Ministry of Defence released a map showing some of the area outside of the boundaries of the peacekeeping mission, and it came under Azerbaijan's control.

=== War crime allegations ===
In mid-November, a video of a wounded Azerbaijani soldier Amin Musayev receiving first aid by Ukrainian journalist Alexander Kharchenko and Armenian soldiers in the outskirts of Shusha after the ceasefire came into force was spread on social media platforms. Following this, a video was released showing Musayev being abused inside a vehicle. It is reported that he was lying on the ground in the car and asked: "where are we going?" In response, the alleged Armenian soldier said, "If you behave well, go home," and cursed, after which it became clear that the Azerbaijani soldier had been kicked. On 18 November, a representative of the International Committee of the Red Cross (ICRC) in Yerevan said that information about this person was "being investigated." The ICRC's representative in Yerevan, Zara Amatuni, declined to say whether she had any information about Musayev. The Artsakh ombudsman said he had no information about the Azerbaijani soldier, but that if he was injured, he was "probably in hospital in Armenia." The Azerbaijani Ministry of Foreign Affairs said in a statement that the issue was being investigated and will be reported to the relevant international organizations. According to the ministry, "the information about the torture of prisoners is first checked for accuracy and brought to the attention of relevant international organizations." On 25 November, ICRC's representatives visited Musayev and Karimov in Yerevan. On 5 December, the family of Musayev was informed of his condition through ICRC. According to a reported copy of the letter sent by Musayev, he stated that his condition was well. Musayev was returned to Azerbaijan on 15 December as part of the POW exchange deal. Azerbaijan had officially accused the Armenian side of ill-treating the Azerbaijani POWs. Amin Musayev, and several other Azerbaijani POWs had stated that they were tortured by their Armenian captors until being transferred back to Azerbaijan. Dilgam Asgarov, a Russian citizen of Azerbaijani descent, who was detained by the Armenian-allied forces alongside Shahbaz Guliyev, an Azerbaijani citizen, in 2014, during an incident in Kalbajar, in an interview he gave after being released, also stated that the Armenian captors had tortured the Azerbaijani POWs.

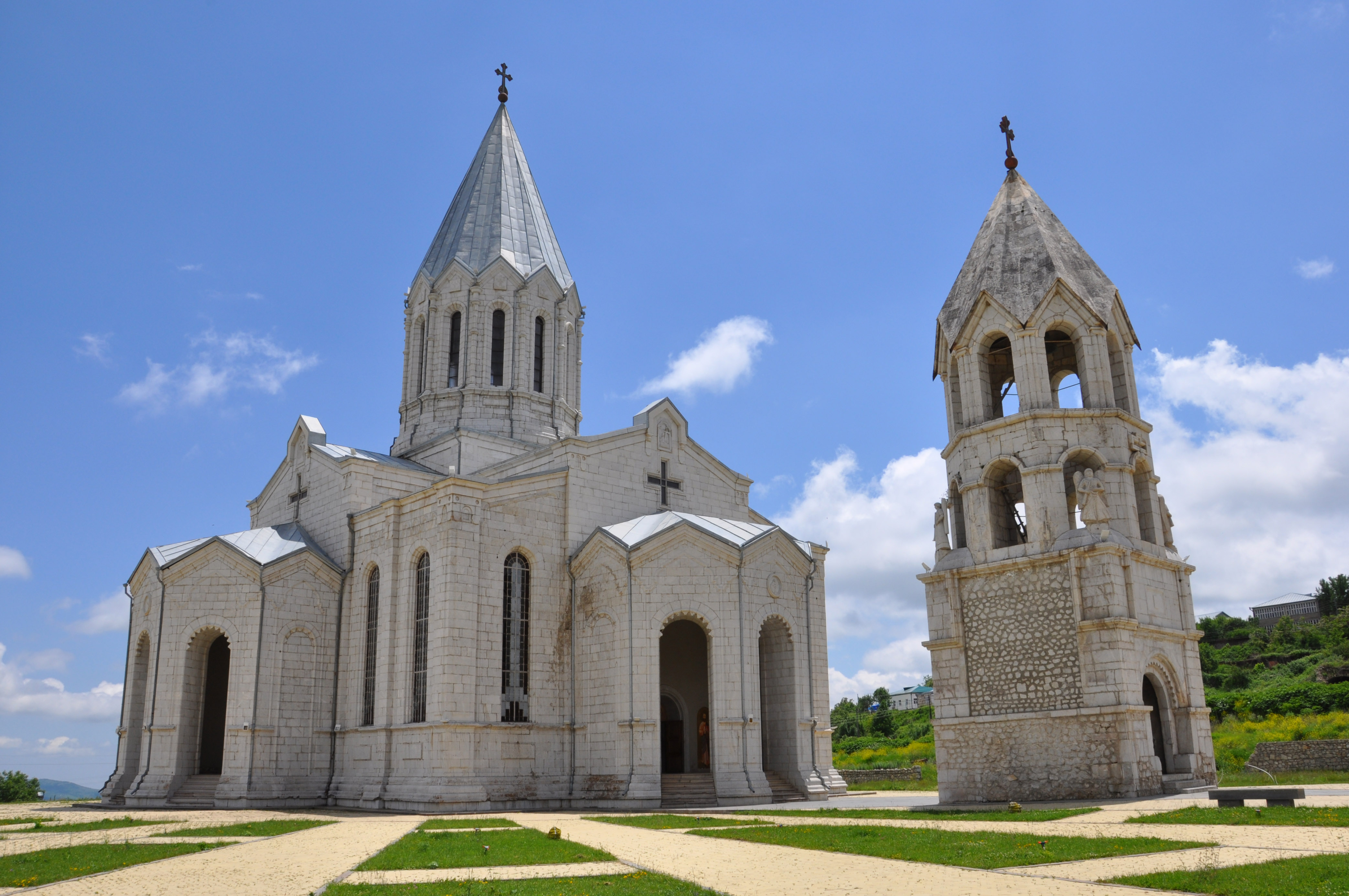
Ghazanchetsots Cathedral in 2013.

On 15 November, the Armenian Apostolic Church claimed that the Ghazanchetsots Cathedral, which was shelled earlier, and Kanach Zham were defaced after the Azerbaijani forces took control of Shusha, prompting a statement by the Armenian Ministry of Foreign Affairs denouncing the alleged act. Human Rights Watch confirmed that ”Azerbaijani forces attacked a church in the city of Shushi on October 8, 2020”, calling it a “possible war crime”, specifying that it was hit twice ”in what appears to be a deliberate targeting in violation of the laws of war”. Azerbaijan's president Aliyev stated that the Christian churches would be protected, this was seconded by Azerbaijan's Acting Minister of Culture Anar Karimov who, in an interview with France 24 on 1 December, brought the Armenian Saint Gregory the Illuminator Church in Baku as an example and added that the Christian religious monuments in Karabakh were "inherited from their ancestors." On 14 January 2021, in an interview with Azeri Press Agency, he said that Ghazanchetsots Cathedral, among other Christian monuments, would be restored by the government. In May 2021, Ghazanchetsots Cathedral dome and the cross were removed, Azerbaijani authorities stated the cathedral was being reconstructed to "restore" its “original” form. The Armenian Foreign Ministry called these actions of Azerbaijan an act of “vandalism aimed at depriving the Shushi Cathedral of its Armenian identity”, pointing out that it was done without consulting with the Armenian Apostolic Church, thus violating the rights of its congregation, also denying access to UNESCO mission of independent experts. The USCIRF also expressed concern over these actions undertaken by Azerbaijan.

In January 2021, the Azerbaijani officials claimed that the Mamayi Mosque and a nearby fountain were vandalized by the Armenian forces.

== International reactions ==
On 8 November, following Aliyev's announcement, the Turkish President, Recep Tayyip Erdoğan, congratulated Azerbaijan while addressing the crowd in Kocaeli, stating that he believed it to be a "sign that the rest of the occupied lands will be liberated soon too." Selçuk Bayraktar, a Turkish engineer who's been largely credited for the creation of the Bayraktar TB2 combat drone, which was widely deployed by Azerbaijan during the conflict, also sent a message of congratulations. Also, in Turkey, Vice President Fuat Oktay, the Ministry of National Defence, Minister of Foreign Affairs, Mevlüt Çavuşoğlu, Minister of Justice, Abdulhamit Gül, the chairman of Republican People's Party, Kemal Kılıçdaroğlu, Mayor of Ankara, Mansur Yavaş, Mayor of Istanbul, Ekrem İmamoğlu, chairwoman of the İYİ Party, Meral Akşener, spokesperson of the ruling AK Party, Ömer Çelik, the head of media and communications in the Turkish presidency, Fahrettin Altun, Turkish presidential spokesman İbrahim Kalın, the Speaker of the Grand National Assembly, Mustafa Şentop, the former prime minister and Speaker of the Grand National Assembly, Binali Yıldırım, former MP and Minister of Culture and Tourism, Mahir Ünal, General Manager of BAYKAR Defence, Member of TUBITAK Board of Directors, Haluk Bayraktar, and the president of Directorate of Religious Affairs, Ali Erbaş, former deputy leader of the Nationalist Movement Party (MHP), Ümit Özdağ, as well as Turkish actor Kenan İmirzalıoğlu, and BB Erzurumspor, a Turkish professional football club, congratulated the Azerbaijani people on the occasion. On 9 November, Iranian MP Ahmad Alirezabeigi stated that the "liberation of Shusha city from the occupation proved that justice has been restored", adding that he was "proud and happy" for the occasion, while the Pakistani ambassador to Azerbaijan also congratulated Azerbaijanis. Former Latvian President Vaira Vīķe-Freiberga and former Kyrgyz Prime Minister Djoomart Otorbaev both congratulated Aliyev in their positions as members of the Baku-based Nizami Ganjavi International Centre.

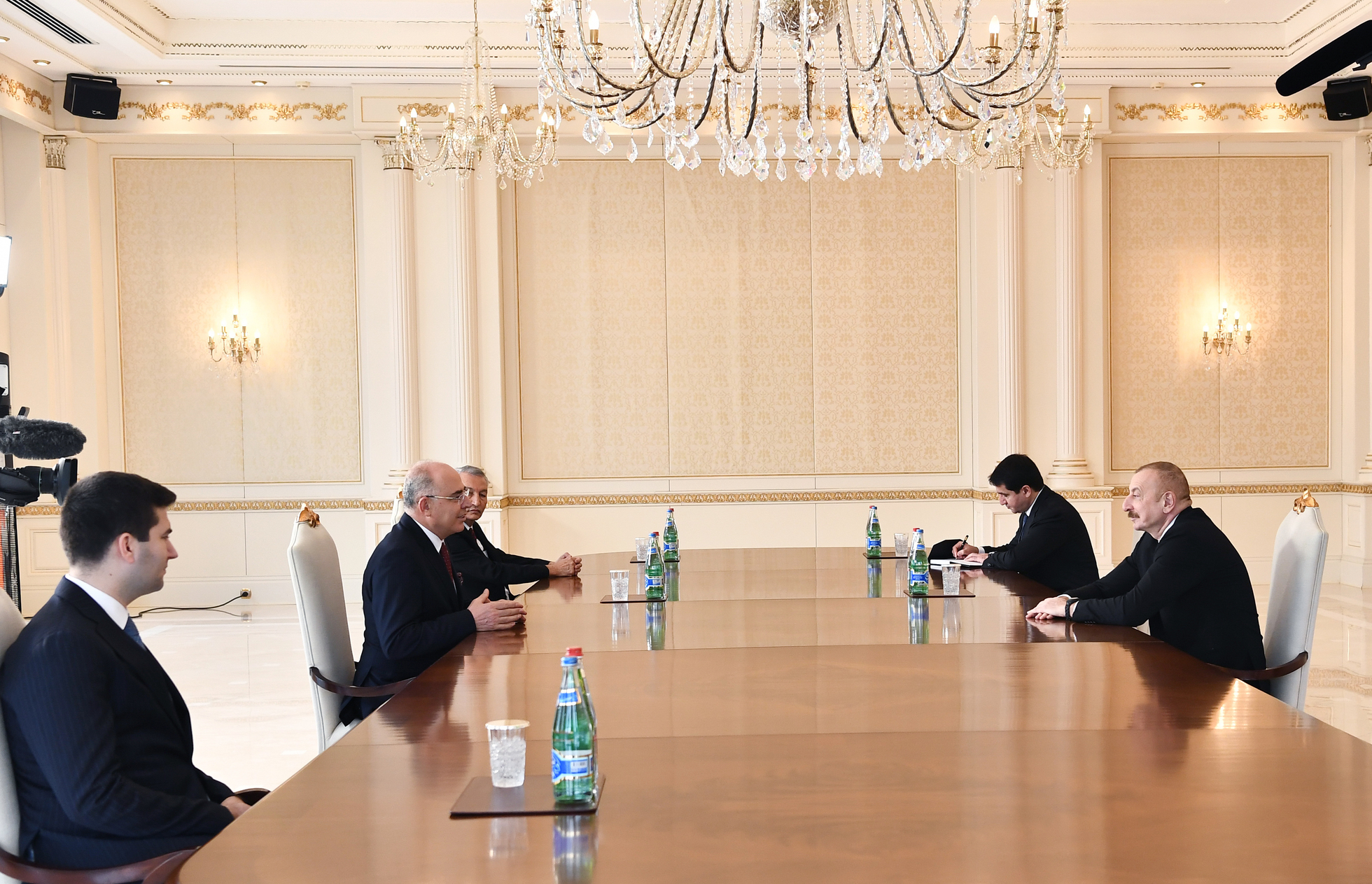
President of Azerbaijan, Ilham Aliyev, and the deputy chairman of Turkey's Nationalist Movement Party, Mevlüt Karakaya, during a meeting in Baku, February 2021.

In January 2021, the chairman of MHP, Devlet Bahçeli, after congratulating the Azerbaijanis over their victory in Shusha, stated that he wanted to build an Idealist Hearths (Gray Wolves) primary school named after Uzeyir Hajibeyov in the city on his personal instructions, if the Azerbaijani president Aliyev and the Turkish president Erdoğan "permitted and found it appropriate". The Turkish Ambassador to Azerbaijan stated that if the Azerbaijani president Aliyev approves, Bahçeli's willing will be realized, and added that numerous organizations and government bodies in Turkey were ready to "provide any kind of support." On 26 January, Bahçeli made a speech at MHP's group meeting at the Turkish Grand National Assembly. He stated that with the school's project was approved by Erdoğan and Aliyev. According to Bahçeli, the school's ownership will be delivereted to the Azerbaijani government immediately after its completion. In February 2021, the deputy chairman of MHP, Mevlüt Karakaya, met with the President Aliyev, the Minister of Education of Azerbaijan, Emin Amrullayev, and other officials to further discuss the initiative to construct a school of culture and art in the region.

On 9 November, France expressed its "very strong concern over the military advance toward the town of Shushi".

== Bibliography ==
- Farrell, Francis (12 November 2020). "The battle for Shusha: the cauldron of generational pain at the heart of the Nagorno-Karabakh war". New Eastern Europe. Kraków: European Solidarity Centre.
- Hakopyan, V. A.; Valikyan, O S. (1991). "Постановление Кавбюро от 4 июля 1921 года. ЦПА ИМЛ, ф. 85, оп. 18, д. 58, л. 17. Постановление от 5 июля: ЦПА ИМЛ, ф. 85, оп. 18, д. 58, л. 18.". In Mikayelyan, Vardges A. (ed.). Нагорный Карабах в 1918—1923 гг. Сборник документов и материалов [Nagorno-Karabakh in 1918-1923. Collection of documents and materials.] (PDF) (in Russian). Yerevan: Publishing house of the Academy of Sciences of Armenia.
- Gilbert, Martin (2001). A History of the Twentieth Century: The Concise Edition of the Acclaimed World History. New York: Harper Collins. p. 594. ISBN 0-06-050594-X.
- Durch, William J. (1996). UN Peacekeeping, American Politics, and the Uncivil Wars of the 1990s. New York: Palgrave Macmillan. p. 444. ISBN 0-312-12930-0.
- de Waal, Thomas (2013). Black Garden: Armenia and Azerbaijan Through Peace and War. NYU Press. ISBN 9780814785782.
- Amirbayov, Elchin (December 2001). Shaffer, Brenda (ed.). "Shusha's Pivotal Role in a Nagorno-Karabagh Settlement, Policy Brief Number 6". Caspian Studies Program. Cambridge, Massachusetts: Belfer Center for Science and International Affairs. Archived from the original on 1 September 2006.
- Askerov, Ali; Brooks, Stefan; Tchantouridze, Lasha (2020). "The Conflicts In The Caucasus". Post-Soviet Conflicts: The Thirty Years' Crisis. Lanham, Maryland: Rowman & Littlefield.
- M. Pashayeva, Gulshan (6 August 2020). "Battle over perceptions: upturned reality". The London Post – via ResearchGate.
- Goble, Paul (12 November 2020). "Shusha Once Again Key to War and Peace Between Armenia and Azerbaijan". Eurasia Daily Monitor. 17 (160). Jamestown Foundation.
- Konarzewska, Natalia (20 November 2020). "Azerbaijan's military edge, Armenia and Azerbaijan sign Nagorno-Karabakh ceasefire deal brokered by Moscow". New Eastern Europe. Kraków: European Solidarity Centre.
