= Alikhanly =

Alikhanly may refer to:

- Alikhanly, Siazan, Azerbaijan
- Alxanlı, Azerbaijan
