= Ağzıbir =

Ağzıbir or Agzibir may refer to:

- Ağzıbir, Agdash
- Agzibir, Kalbajar
