= Agzibir =

Agzibir may refer to:

- Lchap, Armenia
- Agzibir, Kalbajar, Azerbaijan
- Ağzıbir, Agdash, Azerbaijan
