= Gunduz Safarli =

Azerbaijani military officer

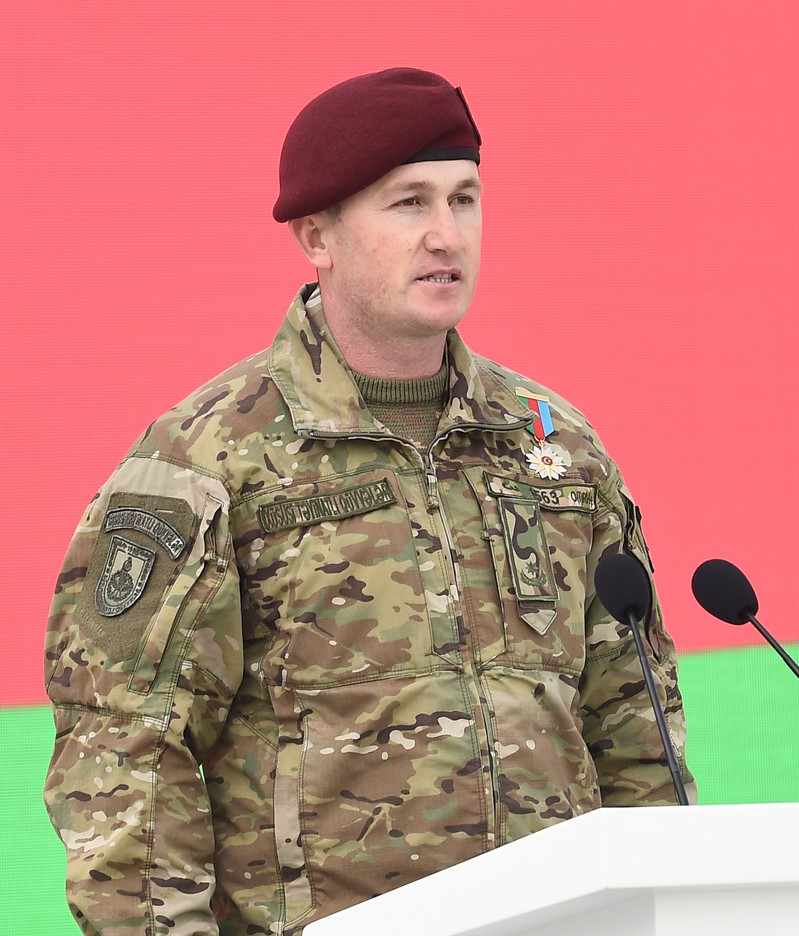
- Native name: Gündüz Ağəmməd oğlu Səfərli
- Born: Gunduz Aghammad oglu Safarli; Aghzybir, Agdash District, Azerbaijan
- Allegiance: Azerbaijani Armed Forces
- Branch: Azerbaijani Special Forces
- Rank: Major
- Conflicts: Second Nagorno-Karabakh War; Battle of Shusha
- Awards: Hero of the Patriotic War Medal

Gunduz Aghammad oglu Safarli (Azerbaijani: Gündüz Ağəmməd oğlu Səfərli), is an Azerbaijani military officer, a major serving in the special forces of the Azerbaijani Armed Forces. He took part in the 2020 Nagorno-Karabakh war, and was one of the commanders of the Azerbaijani special forces during the Battle of Shusha, for which he had received the title of the Hero of the Patriotic War.

== Early life ==
Gunduz Aghammad oglu Safarli was born in Aghzybir, Agdash District of Azerbaijan. He is currently serving in the Azerbaijani Special Forces.

== Military service ==
Gunduz Safarli took part in the Second Nagorno-Karabakh War in 2020. During the Battle of Shusha, on 7 November, Safarli and his squad seized the building of the Shusha City Executive Power. In the afternoon of 8 November, President of Azerbaijan, Ilham Aliyev, announced that the Azerbaijani forces had taken control of the city. On 9 November, the Azerbaijani Ministry of Defence released a video from the city, confirming full Azerbaijani control.

== Awards ==
- Major Gunduz Safarli was awarded the title of the Hero of the Patriotic War on 9 December 2020, by the decree of the President of Azerbaijan, Ilham Aliyev.
- Major Gunduz Safarli was awarded the For the Liberation of Jabrayil Medal on 24 December 2020, by the decree of President Aliyev.
- Major Gunduz Safarli was awarded the For the Liberation of Shusha Medal on 29 December 2020, by the decree of President Aliyev.
