= Battle of Shusha =

Battle of Shusha may refer to:

- Battle of Shusha (1726), a battle fought between Armenian and Ottoman forces in the Artsakh Liberation Struggle (1724–1731)
- Siege of Shusha (1806), a siege by iranian forces during Russo-Persian War (1804–1813)
- Battle of Shusha (1826), a battle led by Abbas Mirza in the Russo-Persian War (1826–1828)
- Battle of Shusha (1992), a battle fought between Armenian and Azerbaijani forces in the First Nagorno-Karabakh War
- Battle of Shusha (2020), a battle fought between Armenian and Azerbaijani forces in the Second Nagorno-Karabakh War
