= 2017 shelling of Alxanlı =

Shelling of Alxanlı by the Armenian Armed Forces in 2017

Shelling of Alxanlı
- Part of Nagorno-Karabakh conflict
- Location: Alxanlı, Fuzuli District, Azerbaijan
- Date: 4 July 2017 (GMT+4)
- Attack type: Shelling
- Weapons: 82 mm and 120 mm artilleries
- Deaths: 2 (Sahiba Guliyeva and Zahra Guliyeva)
- Injuries: 1 (Sarvinaz Guliyeva)
- Perpetrator: Armenian Armed Forces

The shelling of Alxanlı or the Alxanlı tragedy (Azerbaijani: Alxanlı faciəsi) was shelling of a house in Alxanlı village and municipality in Fuzuli District of Azerbaijan by the Armenian Armed Forces with 82 mm and 120 mm artilleries on 4 July 2017. As a result of the shelling, 51-year-old Azerbaijani woman Sahiba Guliyeva and her 18-month-old granddaughter Zahra Guliyeva were killed, while 52-year-old Sarvinaz Guliyeva was seriously injured, but survived.

== Reactions ==
Both sides accused each other of violating the ceasefire. Armenian Foreign Minister Shavarsh Kocharyan claimed that Azerbaijan was responsible for all casualties due to "continuing military provocations against Nagorno-Karabakh". Local authorities of the self-proclaimed Republic of Artsakh claimed that Azerbaijan fired from positions near the residential buildings of Alxanlı. Azerbaijani Defense Ministry spokesperson Vagif Dargahly denied these claims, stating that there had been no military headquarters or firing positions in Alxanlı at the time of the shelling. On 6 July 2017, Azerbaijani state and local authorities organized a visit of foreign military attachés accredited to Azerbaijan and representatives of foreign media to Alxanlı. Turkish Foreign Ministry, ambassador of Iran to Azerbaijan, senators and parliament members from the United Kingdom, and Russia condemned the Armenian side for launching attacks on civilian population.
