= Capture of Shusha =

The capture of Shusha may refer to:

- the Battle of Shusha (1992)
- the Battle of Shusha (2020)
