= Directors of the National Security Service (Armenia) =

Director of the National Security Service of Armenia
- National Security Service
- Reports to: Prime Minister of Armenia
- Seat: 104 Nalbandyan Street, Yerevan, Armenia
- Appointer: President of Armenia (on the advice of the Prime Minister)
- Formation: 4 December 1991
- First holder: Usik Harutyunyan
- Website: www.sns.am

The Director of the National Security Service of Armenia (Armenian: Հայաստանի Ազգային Անվտանգության Ծառայության տնօրեն) is the executive head of the National Security Service (NSS), the primary domestic security, counterintelligence, and border control agency of the Republic of Armenia.

== List of officeholders ==
No.	Portrait	Name	Term start	Term end
1		Major General Usik Harutyunyan (1945–2006)	1991	1992
2		Valery Poghosyan (b. 1944)	1992	1993
3		Major General Eduard Simonyants (1949–2005)	1993	1994
4		David Shahnazaryan (b. 1954)	1994	1994
5		Serzh Sargsyan (b. 1954)	4 November 1996	11 June 1999
6		Lieutenant General Carlos Petrosyan (b. 1951)	11 June 1999	2004
7		Colonel General Gorik Hakobyan (1946–2017)	2004	February 12, 2016
8		Major General Georgi Kutoyan (1981–2020)	February 12, 2016	10 May 2018
9		Major General Artur Vanetsyan (b. 1979)	10 May 2018	16 September 2019
—		Colonel Eduard Martirosyan (b. 1974)	2019	2020
10		Colonel Argishti Kyaramyan (b. 1991)	June 2020	October 2020
11		Colonel Armen Abazyan (b. 1971)	November 2020	18 June 2025
12		Major General Andranik Simonyan (b. 1989)	28 June 2025	Incumbent

== See also ==
- National Security Service (Armenia)
- Government of Armenia
