= Mansimov =

Mansimov is a surname. Notable people with the surname include:

- Mübariz Mansimov (born 1968), Azerbaijani businessperson
- Tehran Mansimov, Azerbaijani military officer
