= Georgi Kutoyan =

Armenian lawyer (1981–2020)

Director of the National Security Service
- In office February 12, 2016 – May 10, 2018
- President: Serzh Sargsyan
- Preceded by: Gorik Hakobyan
- Succeeded by: Artur Vanetsyan

Personal details
- Born: 30 September 1981 Yerevan, Armenian SSR, Soviet Union
- Died: 17 January 2020 (aged 38) Yerevan, Armenia
- Education: Rostov State University; Armenian National Academy of Sciences; Tufts University

Georgi Kutoyan (Armenian: Գեորգի Կուտոյան; 30 September 1981 – 17 January 2020) was an Armenian lawyer and director of the National Security Service (NSS) of Armenia between 2016 and 2018.

== Biography ==
=== Education ===
From 1998 to 2000 he received his military training at the Department of Military Training at Rostov State University in Russia with the program of training of reserve officers. In 2002, he graduated from the Law Faculty of the same university. In 2005, Kutoyan graduated from the Institute of Philosophy and Law of the National Academy of Sciences of Armenia. In 2007, he graduated from the Fletcher School of Law and Diplomacy. Kutoyan was awarded a Cambridge Trust Scholarship for the 2019–20 academic year to study law at St Edmund's College.

=== Career ===
2002 – 2010, Lecturer at the Russian-Armenian (Slavonic) University, the Academy of Public Administration of Armenia and the National Academy of Sciences of Armenia.

2005 – 2006, worked in the system of the Prosecutor General's Office of Armenia.

2006 – 2007, Senior Advisor to the Human Rights Defender of Armenia, and in 2008-2010 – the Chief Legal Adviser of the Human Rights Defender of Armenia.

2008 Received a lawyer's license: in 2010–2011, was engaged in private law practice.

2011 – 2016, Assistant to the President of Armenia.

2011 – 2014, Chairman of the Monitoring Committee on the Implementation of the Anti-Corruption Strategy at the Anti-Corruption Council established by the RA Presidential Decree.

On 3 February 2016, by the decree of the President of Armenia, he was appointed Deputy Prosecutor General.

On 12 February 2016, by the decree of the President of Armenia, he was appointed Director of the National Security Service at the Government of Armenia.

On 10 May 2018, by the decree of Armenian President Armen Sarkissian, he was relieved of the post of Director of the National Security Service.

On 29 December 2016, by the decree of the President of Armenia, he was awarded the rank of Major-General.

On 17 April 2017, by the decree of the President of Armenia, he was awarded the Mkhitar Gosh Medal.

== Death ==
On January 17, 2020, Kutoyan's body was found in one of the apartments of Paruyr Sevak Street in Yerevan with a gunshot wound. A criminal case was opened under the article of incitement to suicide .
