= Homeland Party (Armenia) =

Armenian political party

Homeland Party Հայրենիք կուսակցություն
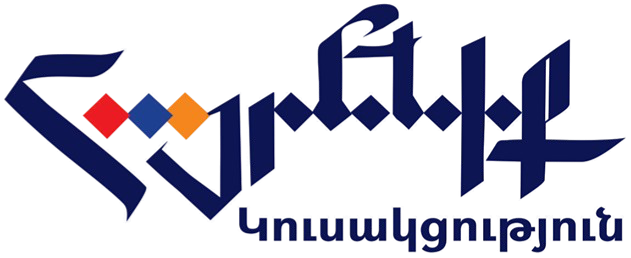
- Chairman: Artur Vanetsyan
- Founded: 30 May 2020
- Headquarters: Yerevan
- Political position: Centre-right
- National affiliation: Homeland Salvation Movement (2020–2021); I Have Honor Alliance (2021–2022)
- National Assembly: 0 / 107

Website
- Facebook page

The Homeland Party (Armenian: Հայրենիք կուսակցություն, romanized: Hayrenik’ kusakts’ut’yun) is a centre-right political party in Armenia. It was founded on 30 May 2020 by Artur Vanetsyan.

== History ==
The party had been registered in Armenia since 1991, and was previously led by Jasmen Asryan. However, the party went into a long period of inactivity.

The founding congress of the newly relaunched Homeland Party was held on 20 May 2020, in Yerevan. Artur Vanetsyan was elected unanimously by party members as chairman and the party subsequently completed its registration with the Ministry of Justice.

Party leader Artur Vanetsyan, was the former Director of the National Security Services of Armenia. Vanetsyan was dismissed from his position by Prime Minister of Armenia, Nikol Pashinyan. Since then, Vanetsyan has been a vocal critic of Pashinyan's government and has called on the Prime Minister to step down from power. Vanetsyan stated that the current government has exhausted the confidence of the overwhelming majority of people. Vanetsyan has also declared support to the Prosperous Armenia party, stating that they are the only true opposition force of the current government.

On 15 November 2020, Vanetsyan was arrested by Yerevan police due to a planned assault on Prime Minister Nikol Pashinyan.

In May 2021, the Republican Party of Armenia and the Homeland Party announced that they would form their own political alliance, known as the I Have Honor Alliance, to run in the 2021 Armenian parliamentary elections. Following the election, the alliance received 5.22% of the popular vote, gaining 6 seats in the National Assembly. The Homeland Party was represented in parliament with one of those seats, held by Vanetsyan.

On 21 June 2022, Vanetsyan announced that he was giving up his seat in parliament and withdrawing the Homeland Party from the I Have Honor Alliance. The Homeland Party currently acts as an extra-parliamentary force.

== Ideology ==
The party has declared itself an alternative force and believes in developing and improving the security, stability and progress of Armenia; with rule of law and democracy as the benchmarks, while also fighting against xenophobia. The party has also supported the idea of collaborating with other political parties in Armenia with similar views and ideologies.

== Armed wing ==
During the 2020 Nagorno-Karabakh war, the armed wing of the party, the "Homeland" detachment, led by Vanetsyan, and consisting of about 80 men, took part in the Battle of Shusha. In January 2021, former director of the Armenian NSS, Argishti Kyaramyan, claimed that the members of the detachment, had left their positions during the battle, though Vanetsyan, and other members of the detachment later denied this claim.

== Electoral record ==
=== Parliamentary elections ===
Election	Leader	Votes	%	Seats	+/–	Position	Government
2021 (Note: Run within I Have Honor Alliance)	Artur Vanetsyan	66,650	5,22	1 / 107	▲1	▲3rd	Opposition

== See also ==
- Politics of Armenia
- Programs of political parties in Armenia
