= New Eastern Europe =

Polish political news magazine

- Front page of New Eastern Europe as of April 21, 2026 - Issue 3/2026: When human rights end
- Editor-in-chief: Adam Reichardt
- Categories: Political news magazine
- Frequency: Bimonthly
- Circulation: 5,000
- Publisher: Jan Nowak-Jezioranski; College of Eastern Europe in Wrocław; European Solidarity Centre
- Founded: 2011; 15 years ago
- Country: Poland
- Based in: Kraków, Poland
- Language: English
- Website: www.neweasterneurope.eu
- ISSN: 2083-7372

New Eastern Europe is a bimonthly political news magazine based in Kraków, Poland. The magazine covers articles about the news and affairs related to central and eastern Europe.

== Overview ==
New Eastern Europe, headquartered in Krakow, was first published in 2011. The magazine provides news and opinion articles on former Eastern Bloc countries. The publishers are The Jan Nowak-Jezioranski College of Eastern Europe and the European Solidarity Centre. The magazine is published bimonthly in English.

== Editors ==
The journal has an Editorial Board composed of: Paweł Kowal, Eugeniusz Smolar, Jarosław Hrycak, Mykoła Ryabczuk, Lilia Szewcowa, George Mink, Jan Zielonka, Ivan Krastev and Cornelius Ochmann.
