= Qarabulaq, Khojaly =

Garabulag / Aknaghbyur Qarabulaq / Ակնաղբյուր
- Location within Azerbaijan
- Coordinates: 39°42′18″N 46°51′54″E
- Country: Azerbaijan
- District: Khojaly

Population (2015)
  - Total: 612
- Time zone: UTC+4 (AZT)

Garabulag (Azerbaijani: Qarabulaq) or Aknaghbyur (Armenian: Ակնաղբյուր) is a village in the Khojaly District of Azerbaijan, in the disputed region of Nagorno-Karabakh. The village had an ethnic Armenian-majority population prior to the 2020 Nagorno-Karabakh war, and also had an Armenian majority in 1989.

== History ==
During the Soviet period, the village was part of the Askeran District of the Nagorno-Karabakh Autonomous Oblast. The village was administrated as part of the Askeran Province of the Republic of Artsakh after the First Nagorno-Karabakh War. The village was captured by Azerbaijan on 7 November 2020, during the 2020 Nagorno-Karabakh war.

== Historical heritage sites ==
Historical heritage sites in and around the village include a cemetery from between the 17th and 19th centuries, the 19th-century church of Surb Astvatsatsin (Armenian: Սուրբ Աստվածածին, lit. 'Holy Mother of God'), a 19th-century watermill, and a 20th-century bridge.

== Demographics ==
The village had 578 inhabitants in 2005, and 612 inhabitants in 2015.
