= Tehran Mansimov =

Azerbaijani military officer

- Born: Qusar District, Azerbaijan
- Allegiance: Azerbaijani Armed Forces
- Branch: Azerbaijani Special Forces
- Rank: Colonel
- Conflicts: First Nagorno-Karabakh War; Four-Day War; Second Nagorno-Karabakh War; Battle of Hadrut; Battle of Shusha
- Awards: For Heroism Medal, For service to the Fatherland Order,

Tehran Javid oghlu Mansimov (Azerbaijani: Tehran Cavid oğlu Mənsimov) is an Azerbaijani military officer, serving as a colonel being a senior leader in the Special Forces. He participated in the First Nagorno-Karabakh War, the 2016 Nagorno–Karabakh clashes and the 2020 Nagorno-Karabakh war, during which he was one of the commanders of Azerbaijani forces in the 2020 Battle of Shusha.

== Life and service ==
Tehran Javid oglu Mansimov was born in the Qusar District of the Republic of Azerbaijan. He is an Lezgian.

Tehran Mansimov was one of the leaders of the Special Forces of Azerbaijan during 2020 Nagorno-Karabakh war, which began on September 27, 2020 to capture the territories and ensure the territorial integrity of Azerbaijan. He was one of the leaders of the battles for the capture of Shusha, which lasted from 4 to 8 November.

== Awards ==
- On 24 June 2005 by the decree of the Azerbaijani President Ilham Aliyev No. 860 Tehran Javid oglu Mansimov was awarded the For Heroism Medal.
- On 20 June 2017 by the decree of the Azerbaijani President Ilham Aliyev No. 860 Tehran Javid oglu Mansimov was awarded the For service to the Fatherland Order.
- On 15 December 2020 by the decree of the Azerbaijani President Ilham Aliyev Tehran Javid oglu Mansimov was awarded the Azerbaijani Flag Order.
