= Artur Vanetsyan =

Armenian politician

- Արթուր Վանեցյան

Member of the National Assembly
- Incumbent
- Assumed office 2 August 2021

Director of the National Security Service
- In office May 10, 2018 – September 16, 2019
- Prime Minister: Nikol Pashinyan
- Preceded by: Georgi Kutoyan
- Succeeded by: Eduard Martirosyan

Personal details
- Born: 8 December 1979 (age 46) Yerevan, Armenian SSR, Soviet Union
- Party: Homeland Party

Artur Gagiki Vanetsyan (Armenian: Արթուր Գագիկի Վանեցյան, born 8 December 1979) is an Armenian politician who served as the director of the National Security Service of Armenia (2018–2019), president of Football Federation of Armenia (2018–2019), and is the founder and chairman of the center-right Homeland Party.

== Political career ==
On November 11, after the Armenian defeat on the 2020 Nagorno-Karabakh war, he was arrested among other opposition leaders on charges of "illegal conduction of rallies". On November 13, they were freed after a Yerevan Court of General Jurisdiction deemed their arrests unlawful.

On November 14, he was detained again, this time by the National Security Service (which he headed between 2018 and 2019) on the suspicion of usurping power and preparing the assassination of Prime Minister Nikol Pashinyan. On November 15, he was freed again after the court declared the detention as unlawful.

Artur Vanetsyan was nominated to lead the I Have Honor Alliance in the 2021 Armenian parliamentary elections.

On 21 June 2022, Vanetsyan announced that he was resigning as a member of parliament and withdrawing the Homeland Party from the I Have Honor alliance.
