= Alxanlı =

- Municipality
- Location within Azerbaijan Location within Karabakh Economic Region
- Coordinates: 39°36′00″N 47°23′12″E
- Country: Azerbaijan
- District: Fuzuli
- Elevation: 228 m (748 ft)

Population
  - Total: 2,139
- Time zone: UTC+4 (AZT)

Alxanlı (also, Alıxanlı, Alikhanly, Alkhanly, Ashaga Alkhanly, Orta Alkhanly, and Yukhari-Alkhanly) is a village and municipality in the Fuzuli District of Azerbaijan. It has a population of 2,139. Alxanlı was located close to the Nagorno-Karabakh Line of Contact prior to the 2020 Nagorno-Karabakh war.

== History ==
=== First Nagorno-Karabakh War ===
In August 1993, during the First Nagorno Karabakh War, it was itself occupied by the Armenians and razed, while its residents fled. In January 1994, Azerbaijan managed to recapture the village. The houses were gradually rebuilt, and 582 families of the pre-war population of 712 families managed to return.

=== 2017 shelling ===
On 4 July 2017, the village came under media attention after a 51-year-old Azerbaijani woman and her 18-month-old granddaughter were killed while their house was shelled by the Armenians. Another woman, 52, who was in the house at the time, was heavily wounded but survived. Both sides accused each other of violating the ceasefire. Armenian Foreign Minister Shavarsh Kocharyan did not deny that the shelling of Alxanlı had taken place but added that Azerbaijan was responsible for all casualties due to "continuing military provocations against Nagorno-Karabakh". Local authorities of the unrecognised Nagorno-Karabakh Republic claimed "Azerbaijan was using its population as a human shield". Azerbaijani Defense Ministry spokesperson Vagif Dargahly refuted these claims saying there had been no military headquarters or firing positions in Alxanlı at the time of the shelling. On 6 July 2017, Azerbaijani state and local authorities organized a visit of foreign military attachés accredited to Azerbaijan and representatives of foreign media to Alxanlı. Turkish Foreign Ministry, ambassador of Iran to Azerbaijan, senators and parliament members from the United Kingdom, France, Germany, and Russia condemned the Armenian side for launching attacks on civilian population.
