= Brenda Shaffer =

American energy and foreign-policy specialist

Brenda Shaffer is an American energy and foreign-policy specialist whose work focuses on energy politics and international relations, particularly in the Caspian region and the South Caucasus. She is a faculty member at the Naval Postgraduate School and a nonresident senior fellow at the Atlantic Council's Global Energy Center. She has also taught in Israel at the University of Haifa.

Shaffer has been the subject of coverage and criticism concerning disclosure and alleged conflicts of interest involving Azerbaijan and its state oil company SOCAR. In 2014, The New York Times added an editor's note to an op-ed by Shaffer stating that the piece did not disclose she had been an adviser to Azerbaijan's state-run oil company and that the newspaper's contributor contract required disclosure of actual or potential conflicts of interest.

== Academic and professional career ==
=== Academic positions ===
U.S. congressional hearing testimony in 2012 described Shaffer as a specialist on the Caucasus, ethnic politics in Iran, and Caspian energy, and identified her as a senior lecturer at the University of Haifa who previously served as research director of Harvard University's Caspian Studies Program and as a visiting scholar at Georgetown University's Center for Eurasian, Russian, and East European Studies (CEREES).

A 2003 Harvard Gazette profile described Shaffer as the research director of the Caspian Studies Program at the Kennedy School, which was founded in 1999 and funded by several multinational oil companies. The program's activities included publishing books and policy papers on the Caspian region, and conducting outreach to help policymakers in the United States and other countries.

=== Government and policy advisory roles ===
A Belfer Center (Harvard Kennedy School) annual report covering 2000–2001 stated that Shaffer had worked as a researcher and policy analyst for the Government of Israel, and separately described a Caspian Studies Program dinner event she led focused on Israel–Azerbaijan relations.

Shaffer has advised Israel's Prime Minister's Office and Ministry of Energy on policy related to major natural gas discoveries in Israel, and has also advised companies involved in Caspian energy production and export.

She has testified before multiple committees of the U.S. Congress, including the Senate Foreign Relations Committee, the Senate's Subcommittee on European Affairs, the U.S. Helsinki Commission on Security and Cooperation in Europe, as well as the House Committee on International Affairs and Subcommittee on Europe.

=== Viewpoints and research ===
==== Research interests ====
Shaffer's research addresses international energy policy, the geopolitics of natural gas, ethnic politics in Iran, and security in the South Caucasus and Caspian region, with a focus on the relationship between energy infrastructure and foreign policy.

Shaffer has argued that energy supply and infrastructure are determinative factors in foreign policy alignment and alliance formation. Her book Energy Politics (University of Pennsylvania Press, 2009) examines how states use energy resources as instruments of statecraft.

In The Limits of Culture: Islam and Foreign Policy (MIT Press, 2006), Shaffer edited a volume challenging the thesis that cultural or religious identity drives the foreign policies of states in the Caspian region, arguing instead that strategic and material interests typically prevail.

Her co-edited volume Beyond the Resource Curse (University of Pennsylvania Press, 2012) examined how hydrocarbon wealth shapes — and can distort — governance and economic development in energy-producing states.

In a 2003 panel discussion at Harvard's Kennedy School of Government, Shaffer, then research director of the Caspian Studies Program, counselled American officials to approach Iran pragmatically, arguing that the Iranian government's anti-Western rhetoric was a tool of domestic politics and that the country's foreign policies were largely driven by secular national interests.

Her 2022 book Iran is more than Persia: Ethnic Politics in Iran (De Gruyter) argues that Iran is a multiethnic state in which non-Persian groups comprise a majority of the population, that more than forty percent of Iranians lack fluency in Persian, and that ethnic minority identities — particularly Azerbaijani — have been underrepresented in mainstream academic analysis of Iranian politics. The book examines these dynamics as a significant variable in assessments of regime stability.

==== Public commentary and media appearances ====
Shaffer has been regularly cited in major international media as an energy analyst. In 2015, Reuters described her as an energy specialist in coverage of Egypt's Zohr gas-field development, and again as "an energy expert at the US Naval Postgraduate School" in reporting on Turkish gas-import strategy in 2024.

She has also appeared on NBC, CNBC and Bloomberg Television and has been quoted in the USA Today, S&P Global, Foreign Policy, and Washington Post among other outlets, on topics including the Russia–Ukraine energy conflict, global oil markets, and Eastern Mediterranean maritime disputes.

== Disclosure controversies and Azerbaijan-related coverage ==
=== The New York Times editor's note (2014) ===
In September 2014, Radio Free Europe/Radio Liberty described Shaffer as a political-science professor at the University of Haifa and a visiting researcher at Georgetown University's CEREES, and stated that her New York Times op-ed tagline did not disclose her reported adviser role with SOCAR. RFE/RL stated that, after the newspaper was shown a photograph of a SOCAR business card identifying her as an adviser, The New York Times added an editor's note on 17 September 2014 stating that the op-ed did not disclose that she had been an adviser to Azerbaijan's state-run oil company and that her contributor contract required disclosure of actual or potential conflicts of interest.

RFE/RL wrote that Shaffer did not respond to requests for comment, and also quoted a SOCAR spokesman saying he had not heard that she had worked for the company.

=== The Washington Post clarification (2014) ===
In November 2014, The Washington Post appended a clarification to an opinion piece by Shaffer stating that she had consulted for SOCAR and other governments and companies.

=== Columbia University event (2014) ===
In October 2014, RFE/RL described a public exchange at an event at Columbia University's Center on Global Energy Policy in which journalist Casey Michel questioned Shaffer about disclosure of reported ties to SOCAR. RFE/RL quoted Shaffer as saying she had a "right to privacy" and as criticizing the line of questioning; RFE/RL also stated that she challenged Michel with personal remarks during the exchange.

=== Investigative reporting and third-party lobbying allegations ===
In 2015, the Organized Crime and Corruption Reporting Project (OCCRP) published an article that described Shaffer as a "stealth lobbyist" and argued that her public prominence illustrated vulnerabilities in U.S. foreign-policy discourse to foreign influence operations; the article alleged that Azerbaijan-linked support and lobbying networks helped advance her profile and that her work advanced Azerbaijani government agendas.

A 2019 chapter by Till Bruckner in the edited volume Lobbying in the European Union: Strategies, Dynamics and Trends discussed Shaffer as an example in a broader analysis of third-party lobbying and disputed disclosure involving policy institutions and think tanks, including references to work connected to SOCAR and to reputational risks for institutions when disclosure practices are disputed.

== Reception ==
=== Academic reception ===
Shaffer's book Borders and Brethren: Iran and the Challenge of Azerbaijani Identity was reviewed by Camron Michael Amin (Department of History, University of Michigan–Dearborn) in H-Gender-MidEast (H-Net Reviews, August 2003). Amin praised the book as a valuable scholarly contribution, noting that despite the complexity of the subject, Shaffer succeeded in organizing decades of Azerbaijani cultural and political history into a coherent narrative that would serve as a useful foundation for future research in the field.

The same book was reviewed by historian Touraj Atabaki (International Institute of Social History, Amsterdam) in Slavic Review, who argued that it reflected a political agenda and criticized it for dehistoricizing and decontextualizing history.

Shaffer's edited volume The Limits of Culture: Islam and Foreign Policy received reviews in several peer-reviewed journals. Ragnhild Nordås, writing in the Journal of Peace Research (Vol. 44, No. 3, May 2007, p. 371), described the volume as an important contribution to the literature on culture in international relations, finding that its contributors concluded material interests consistently prevailed over cultural identity — a result she characterised as a direct challenge to the "clash of civilizations" thesis.

Emad M. Salem, reviewing the volume in the Journal of International Affairs (Vol. 61, No. 1, Fall/Winter 2007, pp. 274–275), called it an impressive collection of essays and found that its contributors argued convincingly that cultural interests rarely override material ones, a conclusion he described as prompting serious questioning of constructivist theory.

Shaffer's Energy Politics was reviewed by Scott Pegg of Indiana University–Purdue University Indianapolis in a combined review in Perspectives on Politics (Vol. 9, No. 1, March 2011, pp. 129–132). Pegg praised the book's introductory chapter as an effective overview of energy dynamics and commended Shaffer's attention to both producers and consumers, noting that her focus on natural gas and the role of transit states was especially welcome given the comparative literature's emphasis on oil producers. He identified as a limitation the near-complete absence of coverage of the Gulf of Guinea region.

=== Media criticism ===
In a follow-up item titled "Academics for Hire", journalist Ken Silverstein criticized funding relationships surrounding Harvard's Caspian Studies Program and argued that external funders could shape policy-facing scholarship in the Caspian-region space.

In 2021, Shaffer published an opinion essay in the Bulletin of the Atomic Scientists arguing that Armenia should close its nuclear power plant. In commentary on the episode, Eurasianet discussed the essay in the context of broader debates over influence and advocacy in South Caucasus policy discourse.

== Selected writings ==
- Energy Politics (University of Pennsylvania Press, 2009).
- Borders and Brethren: Iran and the Challenge of Azerbaijani Identity (MIT Press, 2002).
- Beyond the Resource Curse (University of Pennsylvania Press, 2012).
- The Limits of Culture: Islam and Foreign Policy (MIT Press, 2006).
- Partners in Need: The Strategic Relationship of Russia and Iran (The Washington Institute for Near East Policy, 2001).
- Iran is More Than Persia: Ethnic Politics in Iran (De Gruyter, 2022).
- Operational Energy (with Alan Howard and Daniel Nussbaum) (De Gruyter, 2024).

== See also ==
- Lobbying in the United States
