= Əlixanlı, Siazan =

Əlixanlı
- Village
- Location within Azerbaijan
- Coordinates: 41°08′32″N 49°02′33″E
- Country: Azerbaijan
- Rayon: Siazan

Population
  - Total: 0
- Time zone: UTC+4 (AZT)
  - Summer (DST): UTC+5 (AZT)

Əlixanlı (also, Alykhanly) is a former village in the Siazan Rayon of Azerbaijan.
