= European Solidarity Centre =

History museum in Gdańsk, Poland

Coordinates: 54°21′40″N 18°38′57″E

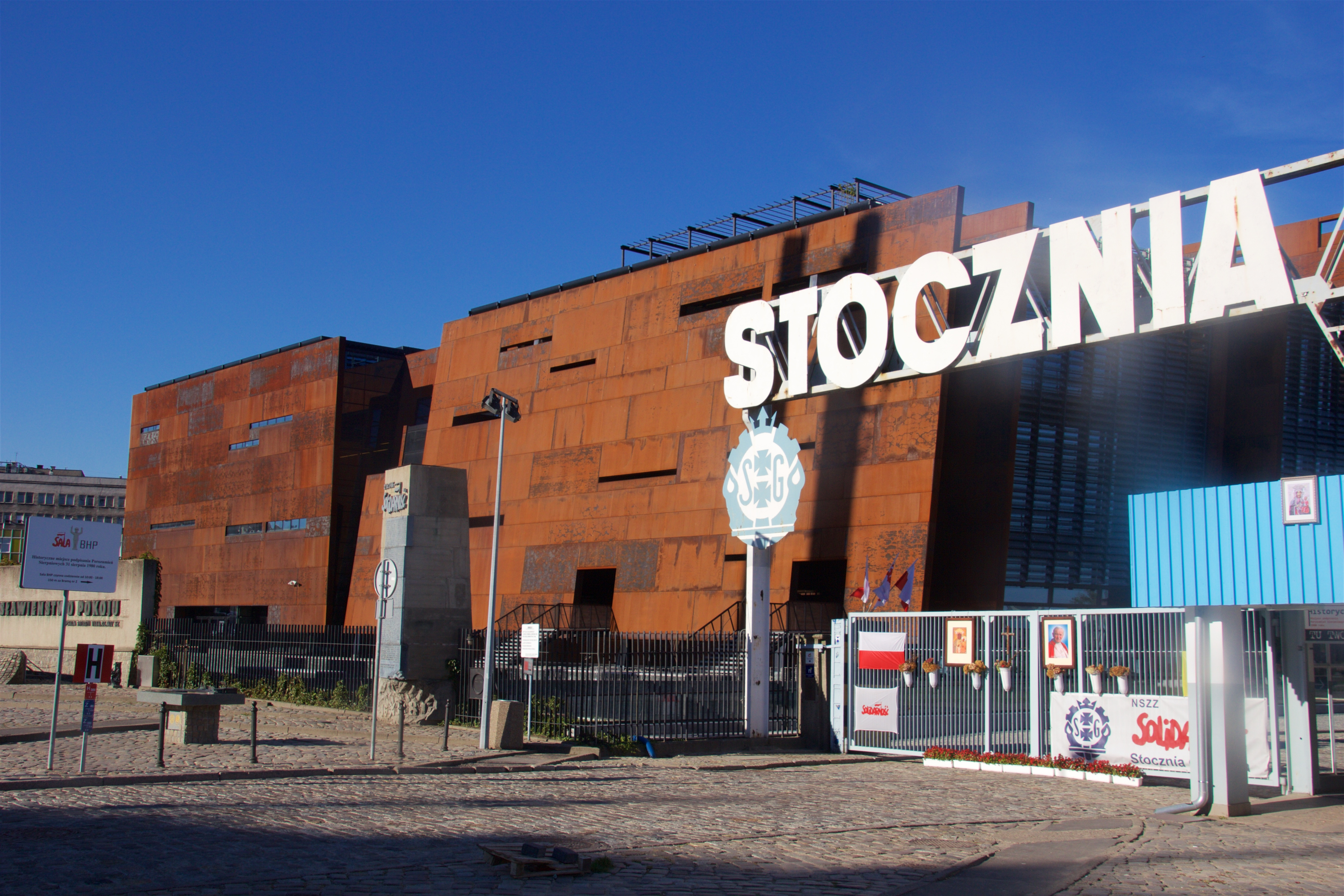
European Solidarity Centre in 2015

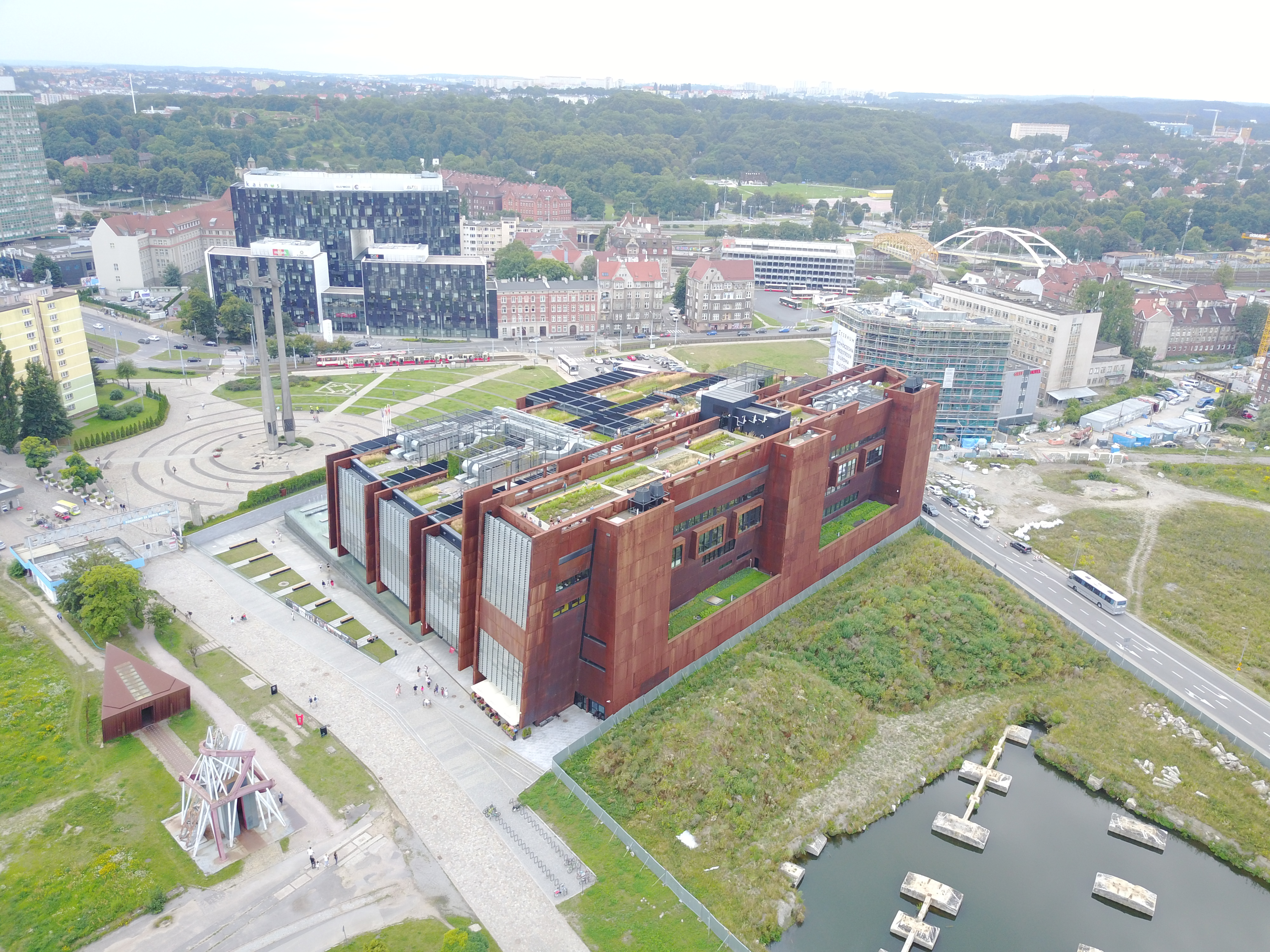
A view in 2019

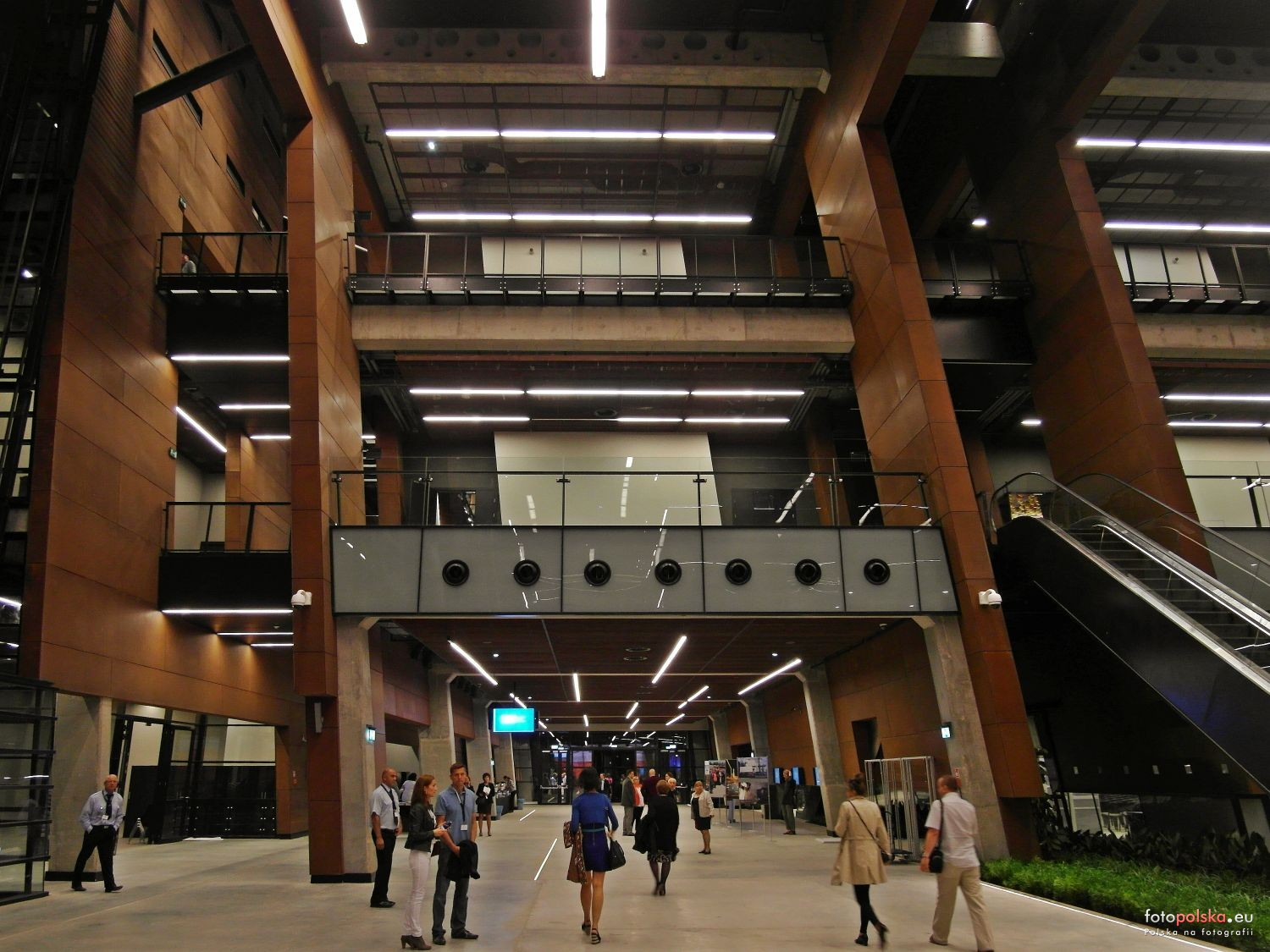
Interior of the European solidarity Centre

The European Solidarity Centre (Polish: Europejskie Centrum Solidarności) is a museum and library in Gdańsk, Poland, devoted to the history of Solidarity, the Polish trade union and civil resistance movement, and other opposition movements of Communist Eastern Europe. It opened on 31 August 2014.

== History ==
The design of the building, by Polish firm FORT Architects, was the winner of an international competition held in 2007. The walls evoke the hulls of ships built at the Gdańsk Shipyard. Construction started in 2010. It was completed at a cost of 229 million złoty, of which 113 million złoty (38.4 million euro) was provided by the European Union, and the rest locally.

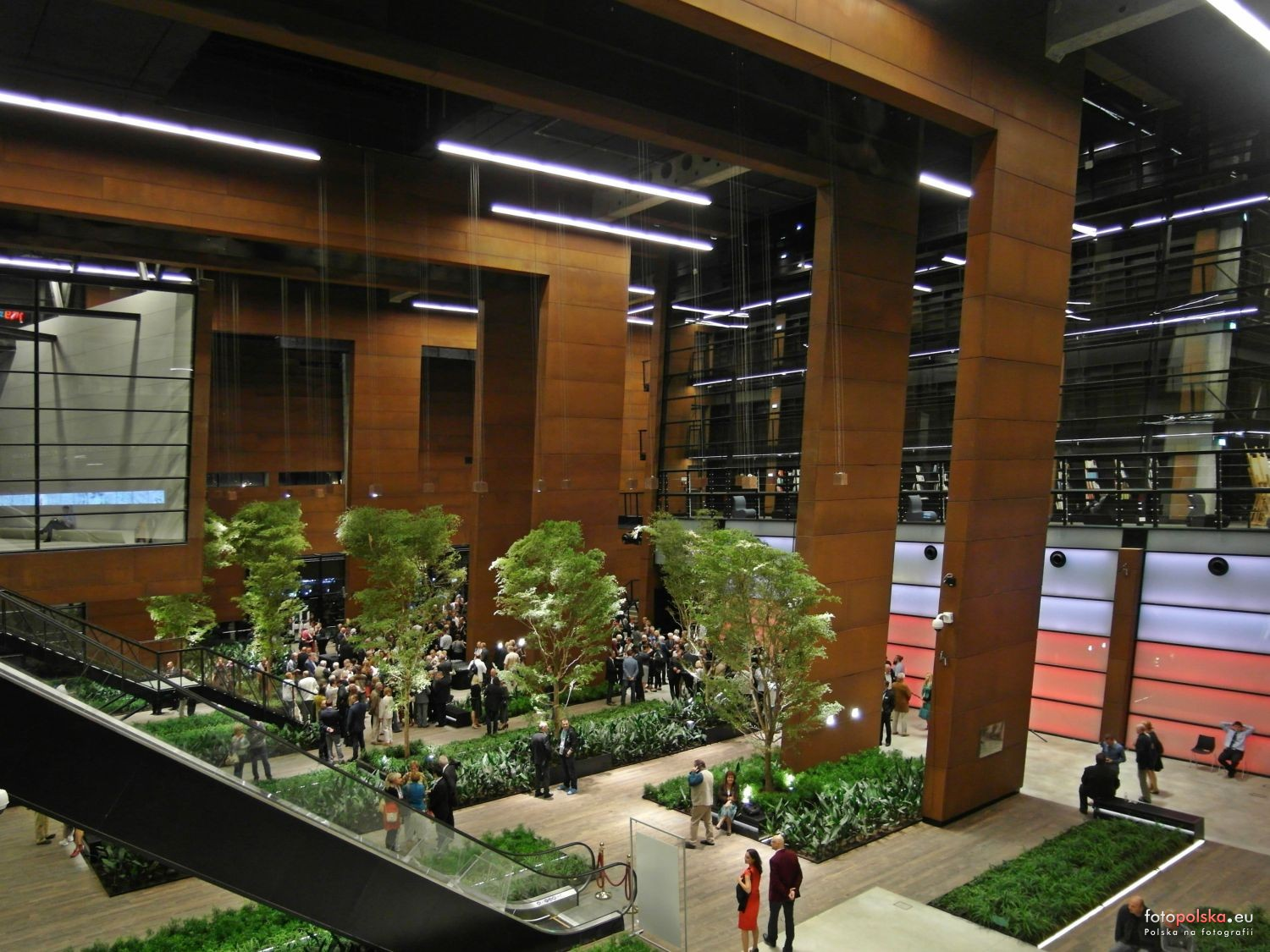
Central Area of the European Solidarity Centre

The opening ceremony took place on 31 August 2014, on the anniversary of the signing of the Gdańsk Agreement, the 1980 victory for striking shipyard workers which led to Solidarity's foundation. The ceremony was attended by Lech Wałęsa, the co-founder of Solidarity and later President of Poland, the President of Poland Bronisław Komorowski and the Chairman of Solidarity Piotr Duda. The preceding day was celebrated as a Citizens' Day in which over 12,000 former Solidarity members and others took part.

The centre awards Medals of Gratitude to foreigners who assisted the Polish opposition to Communism.

== Collections ==
The centre's permanent exhibition has around 2,000 exhibits, and the library contains around 100,000 books and documents. The centre also contains a research and academic centre and conducts educational activities, as well as providing space for conferences and temporary exhibitions.

== See also ==
- List of libraries in Poland
