= Argishti Kyaramyan =

- Արգիշտի Քյարամյան

Deputy chairman of the Armenian Investigative Committee
- Incumbent
- Assumed office 24 December 2020
- Prime Minister: Nikol Pashinyan

Head of the Armenian National Security Service
- In office 8 June – 8 October 2020

Deputy head of the Armenian National Security Service
- In office 5 May – 8 June 2020

Deputy head of the Armenian Investigative Committee
- In office 4 May – 5 May 2020

Deputy head of the Armenian State Control Service
- In office 1 March 2019 – 4 May 2020

Personal details
- Born: May 22, 1991 (age 35) Yeranos, Gegharkunik Province, Armenia
- Children: 2
- Education: Yerevan State University
- Profession: Lawyer

Military service
- Allegiance: Armenian Armed Forces
- Branch/service: Armenian Ground Forces
- Years of service: 2009–2011; 2020
- Battles/wars: Battle of Shushi

Argishti Elbek Kyaramyan (Armenian: Արգիշտի Քյարամյան; born on May 22, 1991) who had previously served as the deputy head of the RA State Control Service (2019–2020), the director of the RA National Security Service (NSS) (between June 8 and October 8, 2020). He is currently the Chairman of the RA Investigative Committee, third Class State Councilor of Justice.

== Biography ==
Argishti Kyaramyan was born on 22 May 1991, in the village of Yeranos, Gegharkunik Province of Armenia. From 2009 to 2011, he served in the Armed Forces of Armenia.

== Education ==
In 2013, he graduated from the Law Faculty of Yerevan State University, receiving a bachelor's degree in jurisprudence.

In 2015, he completed the professional training course for persons included in the list of prosecutor candidates at the Academy of Justice of the Republic of Armenia.

In 2016, he graduated from Yerevan State University, Faculty of Law with a master's degree in jurisprudence.

== Work Experience ==
From 2013 to 2014 Argishti Kyaramyan served in the RA Police, subsequently worked at the RA Investigative Committee as an investigator.

From 1 June 2016 to 6 June 2018, he worked at the RA Prosecutor's Office as a Prosecutor of Shirak Marz Prosecutor's Office, later as a Prosecutor at the Prosecutor's Office of Yerevan City.

From 8 June 2018 to 26 February 2019 he worked at the State Revenue Committee of the Republic of Armenia, holding the positions of the Head of the Department for Detecting Offenses and Conducting Administrative proceedings, Head of the Investigation Department, Deputy Head of the Investigation and Operational Intelligence Department.

From 1 March 2019 to 4 May 2020, he worked at the RA State Control Service as an Assistant of the Head, Deputy Head, and as an Executor of the Duties of the Head of Service.

On 4 May 2020, by the decision of the Prime Minister of the Republic of Armenia, he was appointed Deputy Chairman of the RA Investigative Committee.

On 5 May 2020, by the Decree of the President of the Republic of Armenia, he was appointed deputy director of the National Security Service of the Republic of Armenia.

On June 8, 2020, by the Decree of the President of the Republic of Armenia, he was appointed Director of the National Security Service of the Republic of Armenia.

On 24 December 2020, he was appointed Deputy Chairman of the RA Investigative Committee.

On 12 July 2021, he was appointed Chairman of the RA Investigative Committee.

By the RA President's decree of July 4, 2022 he was granted a degree of Third Class State Councilor of Justice.

During his career, he was awarded departmental medals and other awards. In 2021, by the decree of the President of the Republic of Artsakh, he was awarded a medal “For Courage”.

== Career ==
Kyaramyan had served in the Armenian policing services from 2013, and from 2014, as an investigator in the Armenian Investigative Committee, which he then served as the deputy head of. From 2016 to 2018, he worked as a prosecutor in the Shirak Province, and then in the capital Yerevan.

From June 2018, he held senior positions in various government agencies. In May 2020, he was appointed the deputy director of the Armenian National Security Service (NSS), and on 8 June 2020, he was promoted to the director of the Armenian NSS. Kyaramyan was dismissed from this post on 8 October 2020, during the 2020 Nagorno-Karabakh War. He had reportedly been appointed the commander of the Armenian forces in Shusha, during the three-day long battle over the city, despite having no military experience. Then, on 6 November, he left Shusha, stating that his duties in the region were completely fulfilled. On 24 December 2020, he was appointed deputy chairman of the Armenian Investigative Committee.

== Personal life ==
He is married and has four children.
