= Ağzıbir, Kalbajar =

Ağzıbir
- Location within Azerbaijan Location within East Zangezur Economic Region
- Coordinates: 39°59′42″N 46°15′58″E
- Country: Azerbaijan
- District: Kalbajar
- Time zone: UTC+4 (AZT)
  - Summer (DST): UTC+5 (AZT)

Ağzıbir (Aghzibir) was a village in the Kalbajar District of Azerbaijan.
