= Shavarsh Kocharyan =

Armenian diplomat (born 1948)

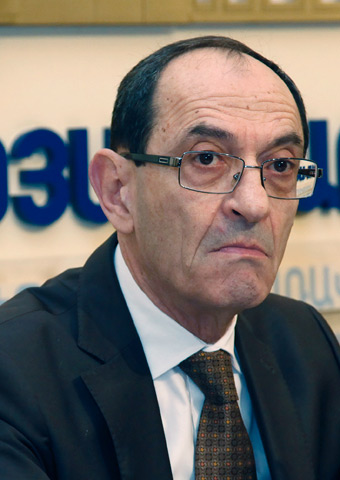

Deputy Minister of Foreign Affairs
- In office 2008 – 17 November 2020
- President: Serzh Sargsyan; Armen Sarksyan
- Prime Minister: Tigran Sargsyan; Hovik Abrahamyan; Karen Karapetyan; Nikol Pashinyan

Personal details
- Born: April 3, 1948 (age 78) Yerevan, Armenia

Shavarsh Kocharyan (Armenian: Շավարշ Քոչարյան, born 3 April 1948, Yerevan, Armenia) is an Armenian diplomat, former Deputy Minister of Foreign Affairs.

On November 10, 2020, during the political crisis caused by the 2020 Nagorno-Karabakh ceasefire agreement he submitted his resignation, being accepted on November 17.

In the early hours of April 13, 2004, Shavarsh Kocharyan as an opposition MP was taken into police custody during a violent crackdown on opposition protests.
