= Ağzıbir, Agdash =

Ağzıbir
- Municipality
- Location within Azerbaijan
- Coordinates: 40°24′34″N 47°23′20″E
- Country: Azerbaijan
- Rayon: Agdash

Population
  - Total: 1,665
- Time zone: UTC+4 (AZT)
  - Summer (DST): UTC+5 (AZT)

Ağzıbir (also, Agzybir) is a village and municipality in the Agdash Rayon of Azerbaijan. It has a population of 1,665.

== Geographical position ==
Coordinates: 40°24′34″N 47°23′20″E

== Population ==
1665 person
