= Office of the High Commissioner for Diaspora Affairs =

Armenian government agency

- Սփյուռքի գործերի գլխավոր հանձնակատարի գրասենյակ Spyurk’i gorceri glkhavor handznakatari grasenyak
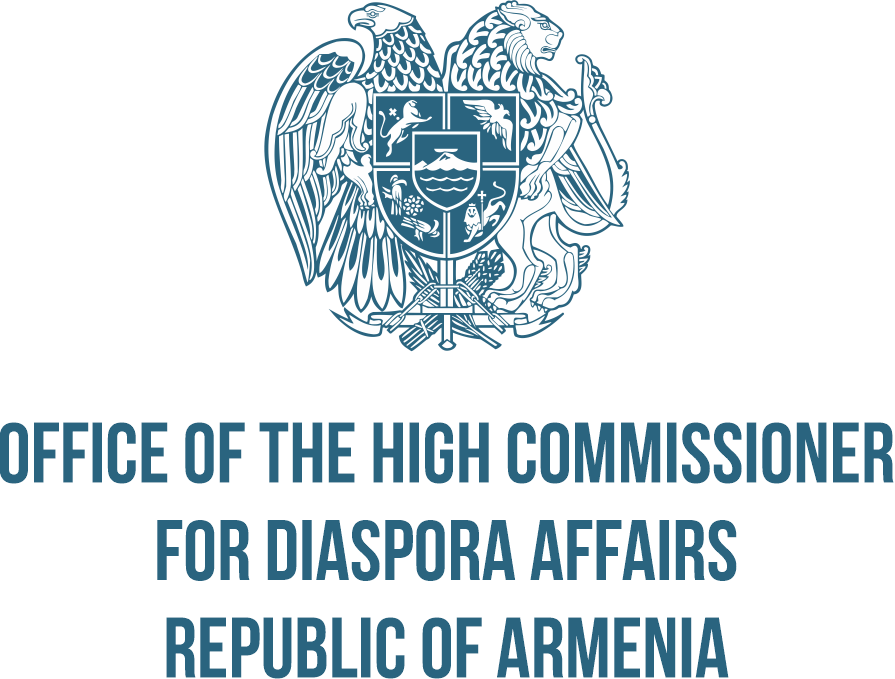

Agency overview
- Formed: 14 June 2019
- Jurisdiction: Government of Armenia
- Headquarters: 3 Vazgen Sargsyan Street, Yerevan, Armenia
- Minister responsible: Zareh Sinanyan, High Commissioner for Diaspora Affairs
- Website: diaspora.gov.am

The Office of the High Commissioner for Diaspora Affairs (Armenian: Հայաստանի Հանրապետության սփյուռքի գործերի գլխավոր հանձնակատարի գրասենյակ) is a government agency in Armenia in charge of coordinating and developing the country's relations with the Armenian diaspora. It was established on 11 June 2019 to replace the now-defunct Ministry of Diaspora.

== History ==
=== Ministry of Diaspora ===
The precursor to the Office of the High Commissioner for Diaspora Affairs was the Ministry of Diaspora, created on 1 October 2008. This ministry was established as a direct response to the growing need for a more organized and dedicated approach to Armenia-Diaspora relations, which had become a significant aspect of the state's policy under the presidency of Serzh Sargsyan. Led by Hranush Hakobyan for nearly a decade, the ministry aimed to strengthen homeland-Diaspora ties, develop Armenia's reputation, and support the preservation and dissemination of Armenian cultural heritage globally.

Mkhitar Hayrapetyan, who served as the Minister of Diaspora from 11 May 2018, to 14 January 2019, played a significant role during the transition period. Under his leadership, the ministry initiated several reforms and programs aimed at strengthening the diaspora's connection to Armenia.

== Transition and establishment ==
In a bid to reorganize and potentially enhance the efficiency of diaspora engagement, the Armenian government decided to disband the Ministry of Diaspora. In its place, the Office of the High Commissioner for Diaspora Affairs was created on 14 June 2019. Following the establishment of the new office, Zareh Sinanyan was appointed as the High Commissioner, signifying a new phase in Armenia's diaspora policy.

== Programs ==
The Office of the High Commissioner has introduced various programs designed to connect the Armenian diaspora more closely with their homeland. These include:

- Step Toward Home: A rebranded version of the "Ari Tun" program, focusing on diaspora youth engagement with Armenian culture and heritage.
- iGorts: Encourages diaspora professionals to contribute to Armenia's public sector by offering temporary positions within government agencies.
- NerUzh: A startup initiative aimed at integrating diaspora entrepreneurs into Armenia's burgeoning tech ecosystem.
- Diaspora Youth Ambassador Program: An initiative aimed at empowering Diaspora Armenian youth leaders with comprehensive knowledge of Armenia's multifaceted societal aspects.
- Repatriation and Integration Center: This is a resource aimed at simplifying the repatriation process for Diaspora Armenians. It offers support across various facets of resettlement and facilitates a smoother transition and integration into Armenian society, promoting a welcoming environment for those seeking to relocate to their ancestral homeland.
- DiasPro Volunteer Program: DiasPro connects Diaspora Armenian professionals with Armenian government institutions.
- Institute of Diaspora Commissioners: An expansion of the networking capacity of the Office of the High Commissioner for Diaspora Affairs through the appointment of Diaspora Affairs Commissioners in foreign countries.

== See also ==
- Armenian diaspora
- Armenian General Benevolent Union
- Birthright Armenia
- Repat Armenia
- Repatriation of Armenians
