= Tom Mooradian =

American-Armenian basketball player, journalist, and author (1928–2024)

- Born: July 31, 1928; Michigan, U.S.
- Died: June 5, 2024 (aged 95); Michigan, U.S.
- Occupations: Journalist; author
- Notable work: The Repatriate: Love, Basketball, and the KGB
- Children: 2, including Bethany

Thomas "Tatos" Mooradian (July 31, 1928 – June 5, 2024) was an American-Armenian former basketball player, journalist, and author. Born in Detroit, Mooradian, often known as Tom, traveled to Soviet Armenia as part of a Cold War–era repatriation program and later became a prominent figure in Armenian sports. When he returned to the United States, he received recognition in journalism and Cold War memoir literature. He is best known for his memoir, The Repatriate: Love, Basketball, and the KGB, which recounts his life behind the Iron Curtain under Soviet rule as an American and his eventual return to the United States.

== Early life and education ==
Tom Mooradian was born in 1928 in Detroit, son of Boghos and Dzovinar Mooradian, Armenian immigrants who escaped the Armenian Genocide by immigrating to United States through Canada. He attended Southwestern High School and was named an All-State basketball player in the 1940s while competing in the Detroit Public School League.

== Repatriation to Soviet Armenia ==
In 1947, at the age of 19, Mooradian joined approximately 150 Armenian Americans in the Soviet Armenian repatriation program, relocating to Soviet Armenia with hopes of rebuilding the homeland. There, he faced suspicion from Soviet authorities and was arrested by the NKVD and KGB for attempting to petition the U.S. Embassy for assistance in returning to the United States.

== Basketball career in the USSR ==
Despite his outsider status, Mooradian became a star player for Armenia's national basketball team. He played alongside Armenian legends like Armenak Alachachian and Abraham Hamamjian. He later graduated from the Armenian State Institute of Physical Culture and Sport in Yerevan and coached youth basketball and volleyball. His time in the USSR coincided with the height of Cold War tensions and McCarthyism in the United States.

== Return to the United States ==
After 13 years in the Soviet Union, Mooradian was granted an exit visa and returned to the United States in 1960. He earned a journalism degree from Wayne State University and worked as a journalist and managing editor for the Associated Newspapers, which included newspapers such as the Canton Observer, Romulus Roman, Wayne Eagle, and Inkster Ledger Star. He notably covered the Alberta Easter trial, a significant local case.

== Writing career ==
In 2008, Mooradian published his memoir, The Repatriate: Love, Basketball, and the KGB, offering a detailed account of his years in Soviet Armenia and his life as an American under communist rule. A second edition was released in 2017. The memoir reviewed favorably by outlets such as Readers’ Favorite, which described it as "compelling and thought-provoking". Additional reviews appeared in Hye Sharzhoom and Asbarez, and the book was recognized with several awards . The memoir has been praised for its distinctive Cold War perspective. Academic commentary has positioned Mooradian’s memoir as among the few English-language first-person accounts of American repatriates in Soviet Armenia, used in courses on Armenian diaspora, Cold War history and Soviet society.

Mooradian’s sequel, The Repatriate: Home, Family, and the FBI, was published posthumously in August 2025. The book continues his memoirs, exploring his return to the United States, his family life, and his encounters with the FBI following his years in Soviet Armenia.

== Government records ==
Mooradian’s FBI and State Department files were among the records reviewed by the Assassination Records Review Board (ARRB). His name appears in the ARRB’s 13th Batch Document No. 124-10087-10332, part of the John F. Kennedy Assassination Records Collection, which included U.S. citizens who had lived in the Soviet Union during the Cold War.

== Personal life ==
Mooradian married Janice Marie Taracks in 1974 and has two daughters, including author Bethany Mooradian. He died on June 5, 2024, at his home in Michigan.

== Legacy ==
In July 2024, the city of Romulus, Michigan, passed a resolution naming July 31 as Tom Mooradian Day in honor of his contributions to the community.
