= Repatriation of Armenians =

Return of ethnic Armenians to Armenia

The repatriation of Armenians refers to the act of returning of ethnic Armenians to Armenia.

Armenians were persecuted, forcefully displaced, and deported multiple times in their history during foreign rule. For over a thousand years, the Armenian people were continuously expelled from their homeland in a process which began with the Byzantines, continued with the Great Surgun under the Persian Empire, and culminated in the genocide of 1915 under the Ottoman Empire.

The attachment of the Armenian people to their homeland has been sustained within the diaspora through the formation of Armenian communities and schools. Repatriation to Armenia has long been a central aspiration of the diaspora; however, apart from the forced relocation of Armenians from the Middle East and Azerbaijan large-scale repatriation to Armenia has remained minimal.

The goal of repatriation has faced numerous goals which have disincentivized migration. Among them are anti-Armenian sentiment within the sections of Armenian homeland that lie in Turkey (Western Armenia) and Azerbaijan, Eastern Armenia’s incorporation into the Soviet Union in 1920, the instability following its independence from the Soviet Union in 1991, the ongoing conflict with Azerbaijan since 1988, and Armenia's geographic position between two hostile neighbors—Turkey and Azerbaijan. These factors have discouraged many in the diaspora from relocating to Armenia, prompting successive generations to remain in more stable host countries. Over time, this has led to growing assimilation and, particularly among younger Armenians, a waning connection to their heritage—a phenomenon often referred to within the community as "White Genocide."

== Background ==
=== Origins of the Armenian people ===
Armenians are an ethnic group who originate from the eponymous Armenian Highlands, located in Western Asia, between Anatolia, the Caucasus, the Iranian Plateau, and the Fertile Crescent. Most of the region is currently divided between Armenia, Azerbaijan, Georgia, Iran, and Turkey.

Urartu, the predecessor of the Satrapy of Armenia, united the tribes of the highlands sometime in the 9th century BC, which eventually led to the emergence of the Armenian people. As the Armenian language spread, the highlands became homogenized.

The Armenian kingdoms that followed enjoyed sovereignty over the Armenian Highlands, but also often fell to the rule of foreign empires. However, when under foreign rule, Armenia often remained a self-ruling geopolitical entity, as a tributary or vassal state, and rarely under direct control of the ruling empire of the time. This allowed a distinguishable Armenian culture to develop and flourish, leading to the creation of its own unique alphabet and its own branch of Christianity.

=== Foreign rule ===
It was in the 11th century, with the arrival of the Seljuk Turks, followed by waves of Turko-Mongol invasions around the time of the Mongol Empire, when Armenian self-rule in Armenia began to dramatically decline. By the time of the Timurid Empire in the 14th century, only pockets of Armenian autonomy remained, such as in Artsakh.

After centuries of instability, the political landscape in the Armenian Highlands finally settled, divided between the Ottoman Empire ruling the western portion, and Iran ruling the eastern portion. The two empires' rivalry was often settled with battles in the heart of the Armenian Highlands.

=== Displacements and deportations ===
Armenians were persecuted, forcefully displaced, and deported multiple times in their history during foreign rule. For over a thousand years, the Armenian people were continuously expelled from their homeland in a process which began with the Byzantines, continued with the Great Surgun under the Persian Empire, and culminated in the genocide of 1915-1922 under the Ottoman Empire.

==== Early period ====
In 578 AD, the Byzantine Emperor Maurice deported some 30,000 Armenians from territories under his control. He told his Persian counterpart to do the same.

The Armenians are a knavish and indolent nation. They are situated between us, and are a source of trouble. I am going to gather mine and send them to Thrace; you send yours to the east. If they die there, it will be so many enemies that will die; if, on the contrary, they kill, it will be so many enemies that they kill. As for us, we shall live in peace. But if they remain in their own country, there will never be any quiet for us.

— Byzantine Emperor Maurice, 578 AD

Turkic violence against Armenians began with the 11th-century invasions of Turkic nomads, escalated to cultural destruction and displacement, and culminated in the 1915 Armenian Genocide, resulting in the destruction of Western Armenia and the expansion of Turkic states into occupied Eastern Armenia. The Institute for Religious Minorities in the Islamic World, states that since the conquests by the Seljuk Turks in the 11th century, "the main theme of Armenian history has been the struggle for survival against the encroachment of Turkic power."

Muslim rule in Armenia in the following centuries also accelerated the gradual emigration of Armenians. Several centuries later, conflicts between the Ottomans and Iranians caused the voluntary and forceful emigration of Armenians from the Armenian Highlands. One of the first major forced displacements of Armenians in the modern era was at the turn of 17th century when the Iranian king Abbas I moved Armenians from Iranian Armenia to the inner regions of his empire. The Ottomans were regularly making incursions into Abbas I's realm through Armenia, one of the Safavid Iran's primary frontiers. In order to remove the means of maintaining large armies on his frontiers, Abbas I adopted a scorched earth strategy and depopulated them as much as he could. He also used this as a way to enrich his realm by moving Armenians into Isfahan, the capital, as Armenians were esteemed merchants. Roughly 300,000 Armenians were moved from Chokhur-e Sa'd (roughly modern-day Yerevan and its surroundings), Beyazit, Van, and Nakhichevan, to Iranian Azerbaijan and Isfahan.

==== Under the Ottoman Empire ====
Until the beginning of the 20th century, Armenians continued to form the largest ethnic group (but not religious majority) in most of Ottoman Armenia. The demographics of the region changed considerably due to the Ottoman Empire's policy of settling Muslim refugees from the Balkans during the Balkan wars into the region, and the emigration of Ottoman Armenians to Russian Armenia, the latter of which had been ongoing since the mid-19th century, when most of Iranian Armenia had been annexed by the Russian Empire.

After the Armenian genocide during World War I, the Armenian population of Ottoman Armenia ceased to exist, being reduced to negligible numbers. Many who remained hid their identities or were assimilated. The survivors who did not remain formed the Armenian Diaspora, a community of Armenians who have spread around the world.

==== Under the Soviet Union ====
Between 1944 and 1953, Soviet authorities under Stalin's regime forcibly removed ethnic minorities, including Armenians, from the South Caucasus, including the Black Sea coast, and other regions. On May 29, 1949, a top-secret resolution, described as "Operation Volna" (no. 2214-856) signed by Stalin and council executive secretary Mikhail Pomaznev Soviet ordered the expulsion of certain minority groups, including Armenians to Altai Krai.

In total, those expelled included 80,000 Armenians from the Armenian SSR, and 2,771 Armenians from the Georgian SSR. Certain historians characterize this as a form of ethnic cleansing. Armenians who had fled the former Ottoman Empire and those associated with the Dashnak party were targeted because their cross-order ethnic or ideological affiliations were seen as obstacles to a unified Soviet identity.

== Russian Armenia (1828–1917) ==
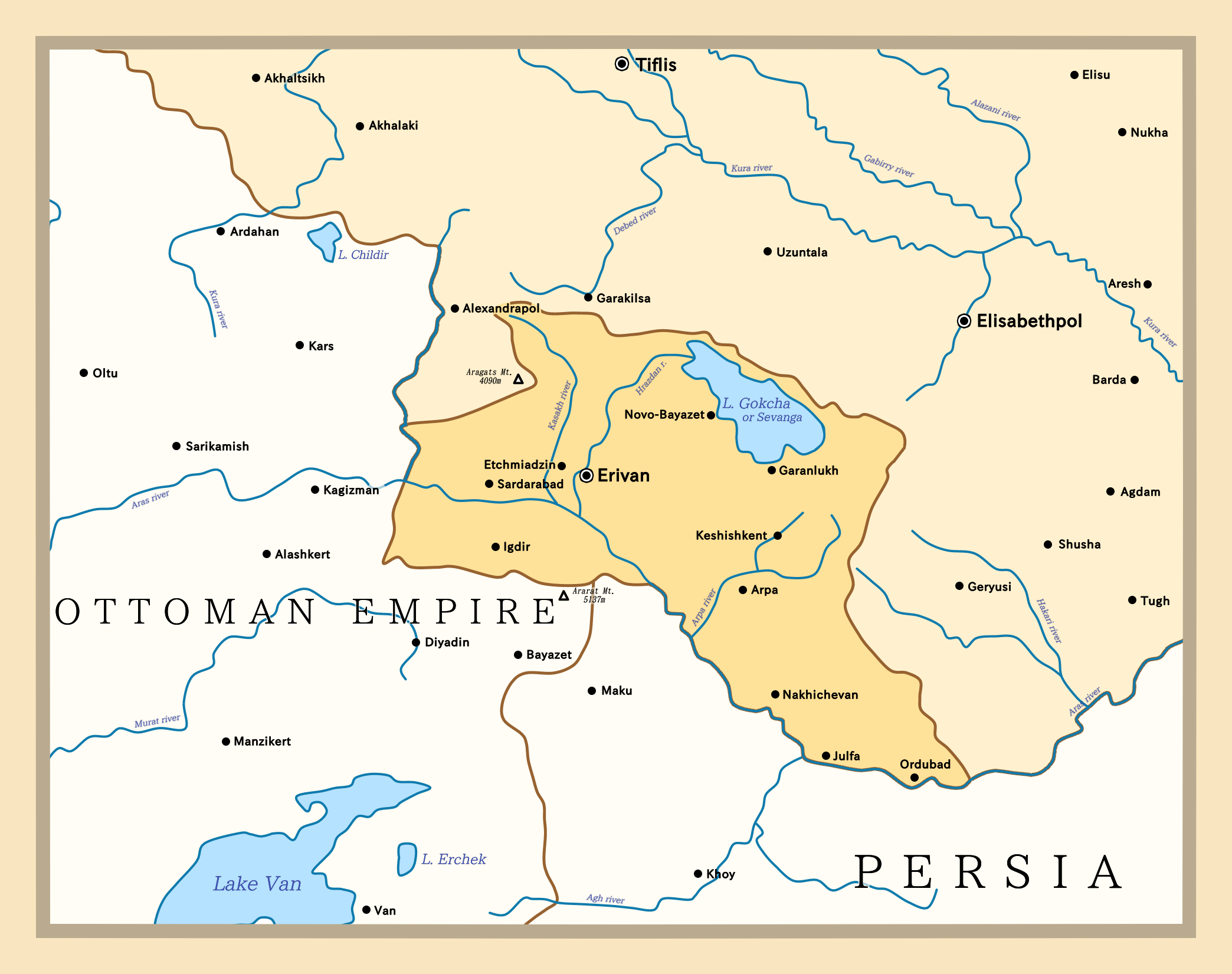
Armenian Oblast, 1828–1840.

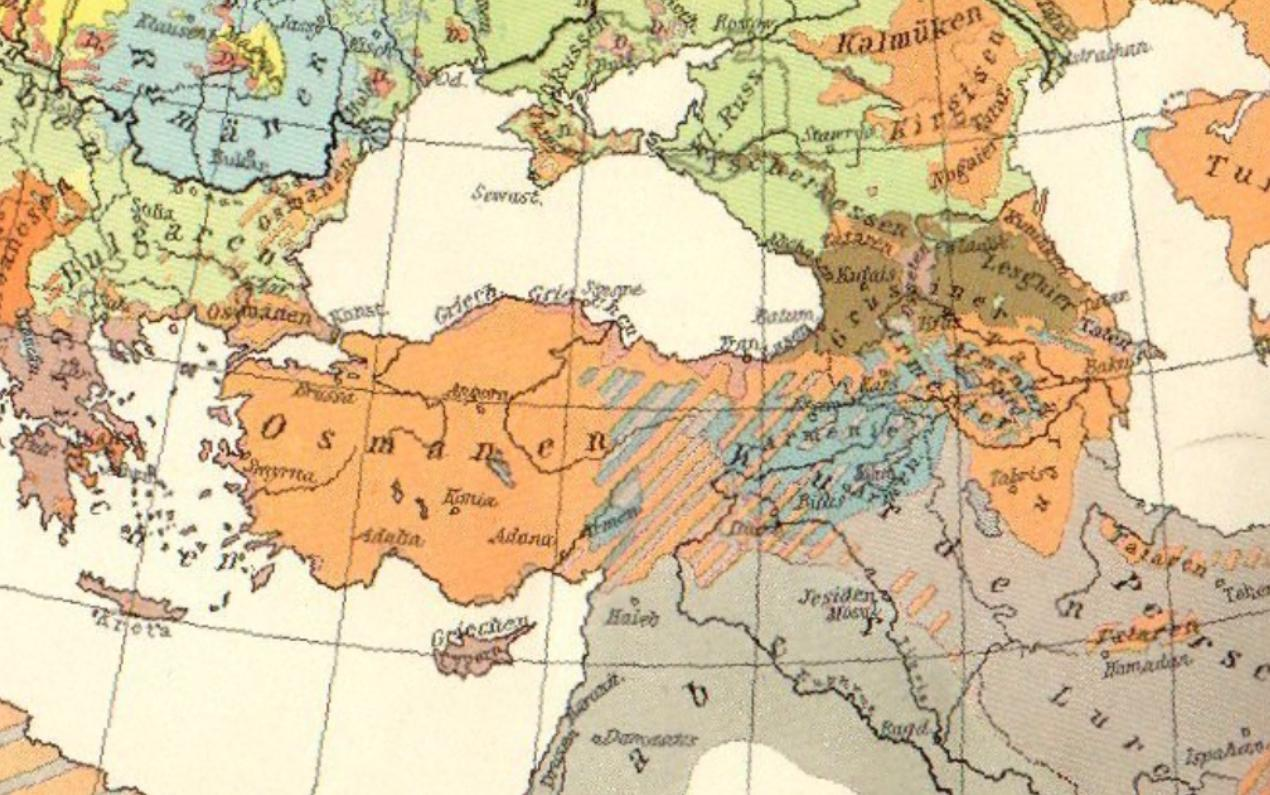
Ethnographic map of the region in 1914. Armenians

=== Background ===
In the 16th century, the Ottoman Empire had conquered Transcaucasia from Iran, which reconquered it in the early 17th century. The local Armenians, who had been laid destitute by heavy Ottoman taxation, and the Shi'ite Muslims who had been persecuted for their beliefs, welcomed Iran as liberators. In 1603, news of an Ottoman counteroffensive reached the king of Iran, Abbas II, who ordered the displacement of the population of Armenians from the province of Erivan (roughly modern-day Yerevan and its surrounding provinces, Igdir, Nakhchivan, and Maku), particularly from the town of Julfa, and also from the province Van, as part of a scorched earth strategy. It is estimated that the number of Armenians who were displaced by 1605 was as high as 300,000. Over the following centuries, several nomadic Turkic and Kurdish tribes settled in the area and established khanates.

In the 19th century, Russia acquired all of Transcaucasia, including most of Eastern Armenia, as a result of wars with Iran (1804–1813 and 1826–1828) and with the Ottoman Empire (1828–1829 and 1877–1878).

=== Armenian Oblast (1828–1840) ===
After the Russian Empire annexed Transcaucasia from Iran, they established the Armenian Oblast out of the Erivan Khanate. In 1826, the population of the khanate was 110,120, of which 20,073 (~18.22%) was Armenian. The Russian Empire, along with the existing Armenian community in Transcaucasia, promoted the resettlement of Armenians fleeing from the Ottoman Empire in to the new oblast. As many as 40,000 from Qajar Iran and 100,000 from Ottoman Turkey left for the Russian-controlled territory.

=== Armenian refugees from the Ottoman Empire ===
The Russo-Iranian and Russo-Ottoman wars caused a sentiment of distrust for Christians within the Muslim empires, particularly in the Ottoman Empire, which was amplified by their ongoing losses to Christian nations in the Balkans during the decline of the empire. Armenians were often accused of betrayal, leading irregulars opposing the Russian Empire to pillage and attack Armenians, and massacres such as the Hamidian Massacres.

Although a number of Armenians preferred Ottoman or Iranian rule, Armenians from within Russia did instigate revolts and feelings of national awakening among Ottoman Armenians. Many moved to Transcaucasia to join the revolutionary organizations that aimed to restore Armenian independence for Ottoman Armenia. This ultimately became one of the factors that led the Ottoman leadership to commit genocide and eliminate all Armenian presence from Ottoman Armenia. The influx of Armenian refugees into Transcaucasia was accelerated drastically as the Armenian genocide was being carried out starting from 1915.

== First Republic of Armenia (1918–1920) ==
After the fall of the Russian Empire in 1917, the Armenian population of Transcaucasia declared the independence of the first Armenian Republic in 1918. The short-lived republic dealt with war from all sides throughout the entirety of its existence. As the Ottoman Empire fell, the partition of the Ottoman Empire was being discussed at the Paris Peace Conference of 1919. The conference agreed that the Ottoman Empire had to surrender all of its territorial claims in Transcaucasia, but the parts of Ottoman Armenia to be awarded to the Armenian Republic was less clear, since its Armenian population had been extinguished during the Armenian genocide. Additionally, Armenians faced Muslim uprisings in the region (i.e., the Kars Republic). Finally, in the Treaty of Sèvres, a large part of Ottoman Armenia was awarded to the Armenian Republic, today referred to as Wilsonian Armenia, which the Ottoman government signed, but was never ratified.

While some Armenians attempted to repatriate Western Armenia, the Republic of Armenia was unable to put the legally acquired lands under its control due to its conflicts with neighbouring Georgia and Azerbaijan. Additionally, the new Turkish nationalist government formed in Ankara by Kemal Atatürk rejected the Treaty of Sèvres, and by the end of the summer of 1920, Turkish nationalists occupied the territories awarded to Armenia, and the Muslim population of the territories were ready to take up arms against enforcing the provisions of the Treaty of Sèvres, as they believed Ottoman Armenia to be their land.

Ultimately, as the Republic of Armenia was incorporated into the Soviet Union, Western Armenia was incorporated into Turkey by the signing of the Treaty of Lausanne, which confounded the hope of the Armenian refugees who aspired to repatriation. The treaty also changed the status of Armenian survivors who had found refuge in former Ottoman territories such as Syria and Lebanon; among the provisions of the Treaty of Lausanne was the requirement that refugees from Anatolia now living in former Ottoman territories be entitled to citizenship. For the authorities of the French Mandate for Syria and the Lebanon, this clause was providential. In 1924, Lebanese Armenians were naturalized en masse, and Armenians have never been able to repatriate Western Armenia since.

== Armenian Soviet Socialist Republic (1920–1991) ==
Following the Armenian genocide, a vast number of Armenians had fled to countries near the Ottoman Empire, such as Syria, Egypt and Lebanon, and formed large Armenian communities. With the ceding of the Syrian territory of Alexandretta by France to Turkey in 1939, a second wave of migrations of Armenians to the Levant took place.

From 1920 to 1929, some 28,000 Armenian refugees were invited by the Soviet government to settle in Armenia, hailing predominantly from Greece, Iraq and Istanbul, Turkey, as well as some from France and the United States. Edmund Herzig and Marina Kurkchiyan describe the dilemma of the League of Nations on the subject of the Armenian refugees:

The Norwegian explorer and humanitarian Fridtjof Nansen, as League of Nations’ High Commissioner for Refugees, worked assiduously to convince the League to finance the repatriation of Armenians to Soviet Armenia. ‘There is, in fact,’he argued, ‘in this little republic a national home for the Armenians at last, and I ask the members of the Assembly whether they sincerely and earnestly believe that any other national home can be hoped for. I believe I know the answer which their consciences will give, and I appeal to the Assembly to approve this one effort to carry out all the promises which have been made in the past concerning a national home for the Armenian nation’. Ultimately the loan was not given, but from 1929 to 1937 16,000 more refugees arrived in Armenia, mostly from Europe and financed by the Soviet government.

In the 1940s, the Armenian Soviet Socialist Republic organized an international repatriation campaign. A sizeable number of Armenians from the Diaspora repatriated the years following World War II. Between 1946 and 1949, over 89,000 Armenians — including more than 38,000 from Arab countries like Syria, Lebanon, Egypt, Palestine, and Iraq — migrated to Soviet Armenia. Many immigrants, however, faced economic hardship, cultural isolation, and state suspicion, leading some to eventually re-emigrate. Memoirs by repatriates such as Armand Maloumian, Lazare Indjeyan, and Tom Mooradian have documented the challenges faced by Armenians who returned to Soviet Armenia in the 1946–1949 repatriation campaign. From 1945 to 1953, the Soviet Union also proposed the incorporation of historical Western Armenian territories into the USSR and the repatriation of Armenians from the Armenian diaspora.

=== Egypt ===
Armenians who settled in Egypt lived in prosperity. Following World War II, only a few thousand persons answered the call for repatriation to Soviet Armenia.

=== Lebanon ===
Between 1946 and 1949, Lebanese President Bechara El Khoury’s administration provided assistance to Lebanese and Syrian Armenians who wished to repatriate to Soviet Armenia. However, Armenians felt more comfortable in Lebanon, and many of those who left Lebanon for Soviet Armenia in the 1940s under the Soviet Union's Armenian repatriation campaign returned to live in Lebanon, as Lebanon was considered a "second Armenia".

== Republic of Armenia (1991–present) ==
One of the main challenges of the Republic of Armenia is preserving its population numbers. Despite the recent rise in repatriation, the number of Armenians leaving Armenia is consistently higher.

=== Acquisition of an Armenian citizenship ===
The Republic of Armenia has made an effort to simplify the acquisition of Armenian citizenship for ethnic Armenians living abroad, by including the right of return for members of the Armenian diaspora, and since 2007 permitting dual citizenship. Diaspora Armenians who want to live and work in Armenia, but want to be exempt from military service can also apply for a special residency status, which gives them a special passport and the same rights as citizens except the right to vote or access to the same countries that an Armenia passport would. Survivors of the Armenian genocide are granted special passports through a facilitated procedure, and the application fee is waived.

=== Syrian Civil War (2011–2024) ===
Since the start of the Syrian Civil War, 16,623 Armenian Syrians found refuge in Armenia, of which 13,000 remained and repatriated (as of July 2015). The government of Armenia is offering several protection options including simplified naturalization by Armenian descent (15,000 persons acquired Armenian citizenship), accelerated asylum procedures and facilitated short, mid and long-term residence permits.

According to Hranush Hakobyan only 15,000 Armenians are left in Syria and the rest have been settled in Armenia or Artsakh, with another 8,000 having left for Lebanon, and others going to destinations including Europe, the United States and Canada. However, Armenian foundations in Syria estimate around 35,000 are left based on rough estimates.

Azerbaijan has raised concerns over settlement of Syrian Armenians in the disputed territory of the Republic of Artsakh.

The integration of Syrian-Armenians to the Armenian community proved to be reasonably successful. Though Armenia could not provide many economic advantages to the arriving refugees, the Syrian-Armenians quickly found success in the food, restaurant, café, Horeca, and Accommodation industries. The arrival of the Syrian-Armenians caused many positive externalities, one of the most prominent being the increase in the quality of the service industry within Armenia. In order for local Armenian businesses to survive, they had to compete with the newly opened Syrian-Armenian businesses, which increased competition and, later on, quality.

Although many Syrian-Armenians found success in Armenia, many had to leave their ancestral homeland to North America and Europe for better job opportunities.

=== 2018 Velvet Revolution ===
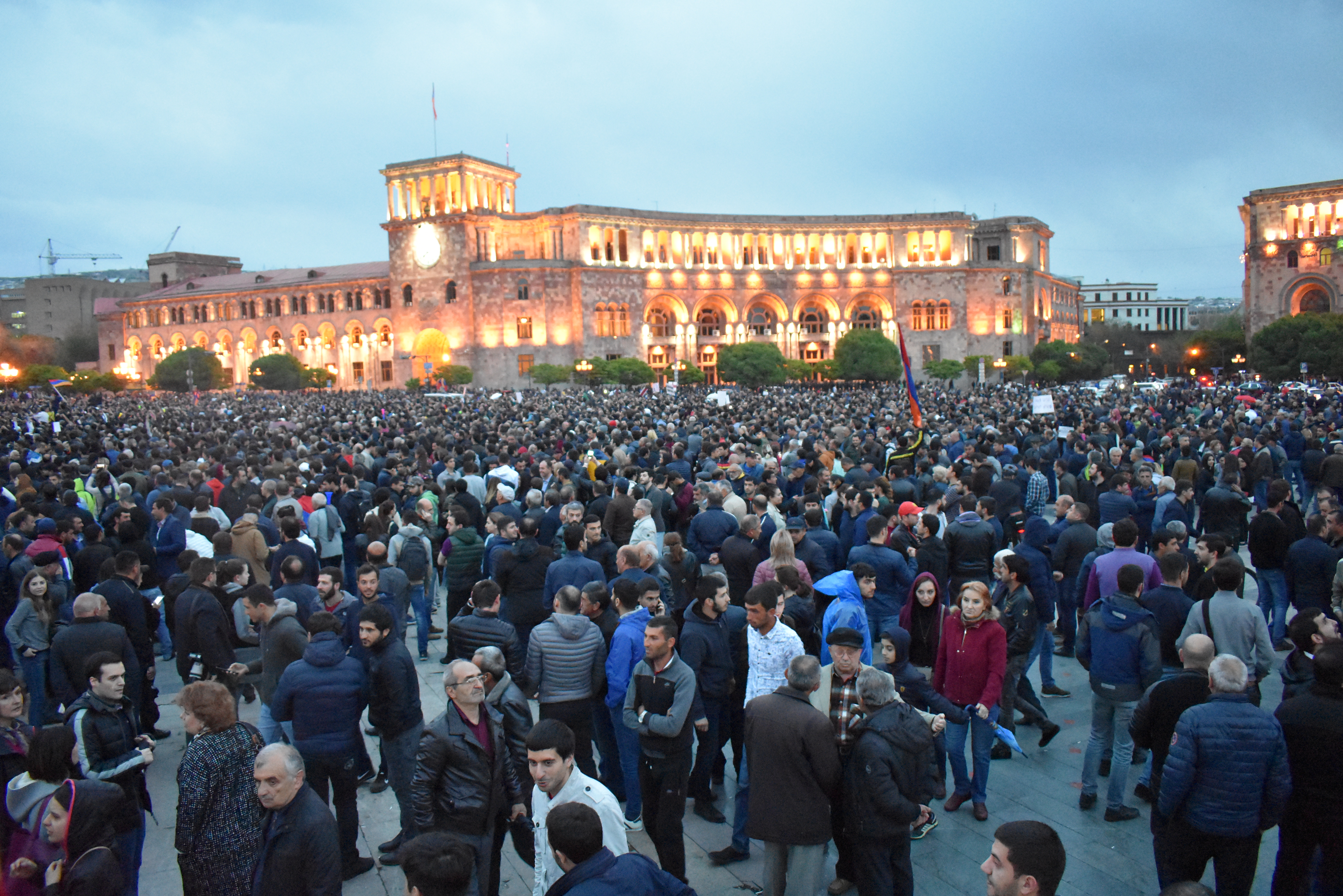
Demonstration in Republic Square, Yerevan, 20 April 2018.

The corruption of the government of the Republic of Armenia has been criticized for having been one of the primary reasons as to why Diaspora Armenians have been detached from the Republic of Armenia. However, the success of the 2018 Velvet Revolution, aiming to end the corruption, is being seen as a turning point in the history of Armenia, with hopes that these negative opinions of Armenia will change and produce a new wave of repatriates. Awareness for these changes was boosted by several famous Armenians in the Diaspora, such as Serj Tankian from the System of a Down band.

On 20 May 2018, the president of Armenia, Armen Sarkissian, addressed the younger generation of Armenians worldwide during the Armenia Tomorrow: Citizen Diplomacy at Work conference organized by the University of Southern California Institute of Armenian Studies, in the wake of the Velvet Revolution:

The opportunities of [the Velvet Revolution] creates huge expectations worldwide amongst Armenians, especially among the younger generation, because that, first of all, makes Armenians, especially the younger ones, to feel again that they are the owners of this country [Armenia], they are the owners of the values, they are the owners of the heritage, they are the owners of the future of this country [Armenia]. [...] That feeling of being a citizen, i.e., being the responsible for the future is there. [...]

The opportunities are huge because we are first of all to use the fact that I call that we are a small state but a global nation; there are four or five times, probably more, Armenians living abroad than in Armenia today. A lot of them are very good citizens of the countries that they are living today; some of them are highly recognized by international community as professional successful businessmen, scientists, politicians, etc., and most of them are highly respectful, honest people. So it's the time that everybody recognizes that Armenia, their homeland, is really their homeland, and they belong to this state and they belong to this great nation, and to use this opportunity to rebuilding our country, our state, for the next generation to make sure that, tomorrow, Armenia will be better than today. [...]

That's opportunity [...] to really open the door for every Armenian that believes that he has something to offer to his homeland, to have this opportunity of investing time, energy, professionals, [...] into this country.

[...] our future successes will be connected with one fact: do we really believe that the future of this country is in our hands? Do we know that there is a huge responsibility, not only [on the government], no, the responsibility is on every and each Armenian, be that in Armenia, in Artsakh, or in Diaspora.

[...] we cannot basically achieve what we want to achieve alone. You are sons and daughters of Armenia, [...], no matter where you live, [...], you have to believe that you are a part of this great nation, so, well I hope one day, at the end of my term of president, at least I will be able to say that all of these years, I achieved something. To be not the president of the citizens of Republic of Armenia, but also the president of all Armenians worldwide, not by name, but by work, and hard work, to make this country great.

— Armen Sarkissian, 4th president of Armenia

== Diaspora and NGOs (1915–present) ==
Armenian communities and schools around the world often organize trips to Armenia, to visit or to offer volunteer work in exchange for accommodation subsidies, to preserve the sentiment of attachment to their homeland in the younger generations.

The Armenian General Benevolent Union (AGBU), the biggest and most influential Armenian organization in the world, helps to preserve and promote Armenian identity and heritage through educational, cultural and humanitarian programs, annually serving some 500,000 Armenians in over 30 countries. Other Armenian community organizations, such as the Armenian Youth Federation (AYF), also help to preserve the Armenian identity within the Diaspora.

Another international non-profit organization called Birthright Armenia, founded in 2003 by Edele Hovnanian, provides services to help Diaspora Armenians develop personal ties and a renewed sense of Armenian identity. Birthright Armenia is a volunteer internship enhancement program that also offers travel fellowships to eligible participants to assist in the development of Armenia. To participate, applicants are required to be of Armenian descent and be within a certain age range.

The non-profit NGO Repat Armenia, established in August 2012, provides services to assist Diaspora Armenians with their repatriation process. Their mission is to encourage the repatriation of professional and entrepreneurial individuals and families to Armenia to help in the development of the Armenian nation. They also influence government policies, and help to develop a pro-repatriation environment in Armenia.

All of these organizations have made efforts to reconnect the Diaspora Armenians with their homeland, in hopes that they will one day repatriate.

== See also ==
- Armenian diaspora
- Armenian General Benevolent Union
- Armenian Genocide Survivors
- Armenian Revolutionary Federation
- Assembly of Armenians of Europe
- Demographics of Armenia
- History of Armenia
- Office of the High Commissioner for Diaspora Affairs
- Ottoman Armenian population § Arnold J. Toynbee (1916)
- Repat Armenia
- Union of Armenians of Europe
