= Armenian genocide survivors =

People who survived the Armenian genocide

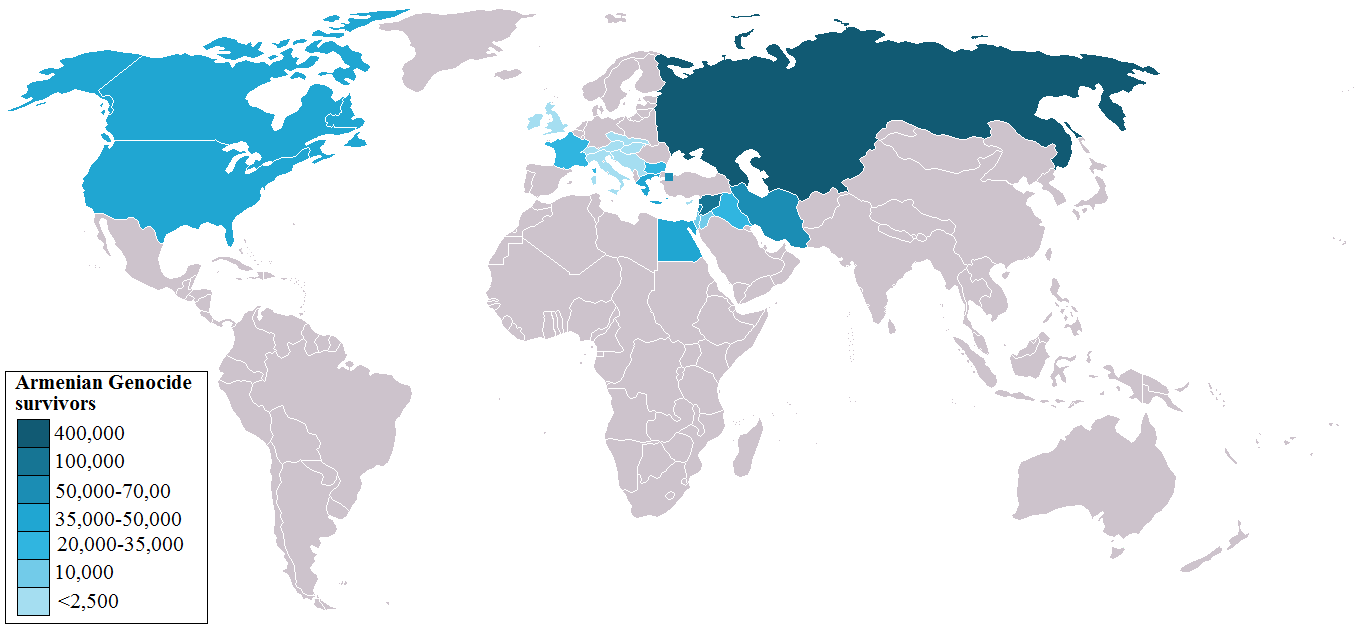
Armenian genocide survivors map

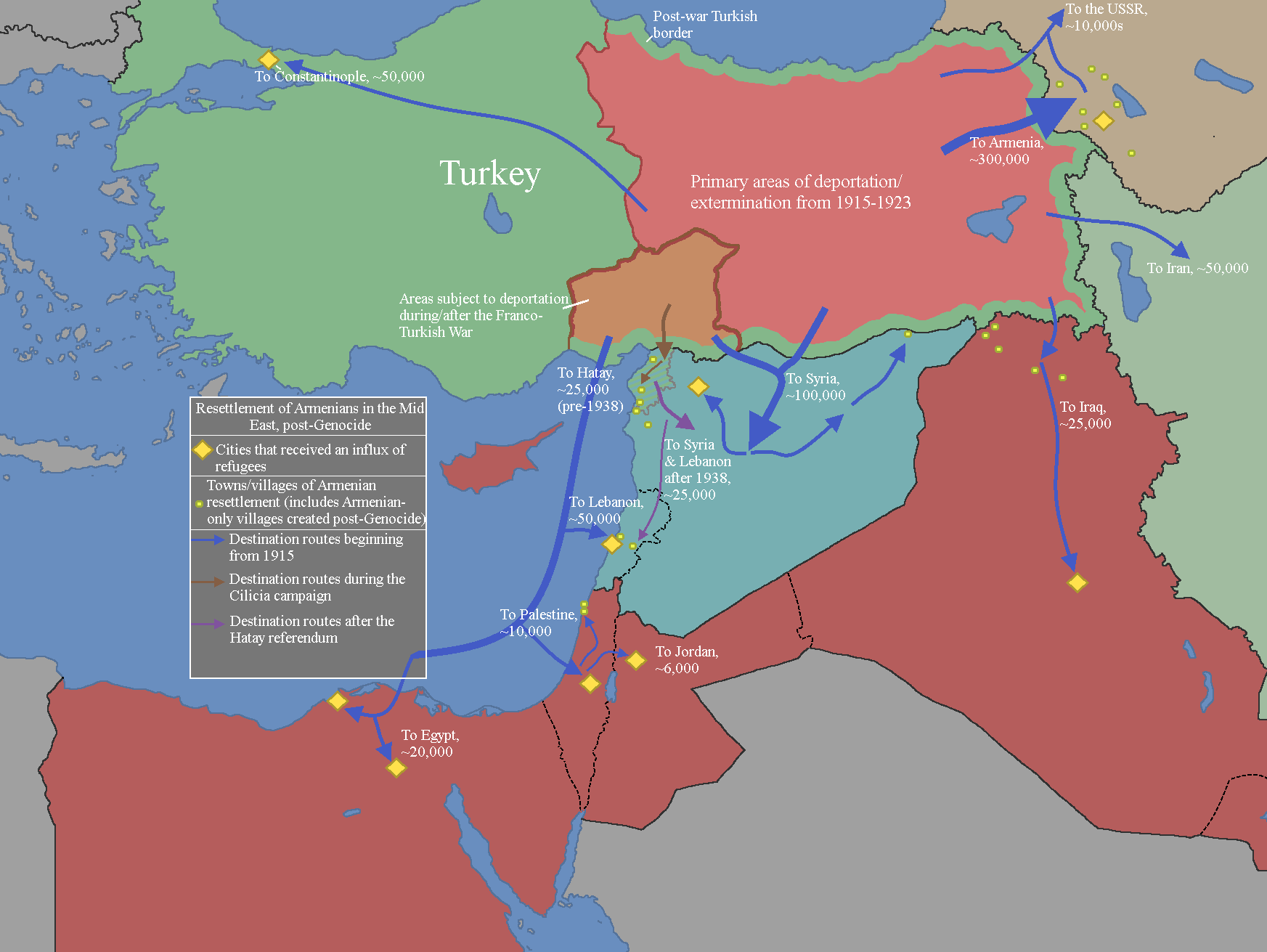
Settlement and routes for Armenian refugees during and after the Armenian Genocide, up to the Hatay Referendum.

Armenian genocide survivors were Armenians in the Ottoman Empire who survived the Armenian genocide. After the end of World War I, many tried to return home in Western Armenia but most were prevented by the Turkish nationalist movement which considered Armenian survivors to be a mortal threat to the Turkish state. Thousands of Armenians who tried to return were killed.

Roughly half of the survivors fled to neighboring countries in the Middle East with the other half fleeing to Eastern Armenia which later became the First Republic of Armenia. A further wave of Armenian refugees was created by the Turkey's invasion of the new Armenian Republic, and another 100,000 Armenians were uprooted from their homes in Cilicia following the French withdrawal in 1920. Between 1922 and 1929, the Turkish authorities eliminated surviving Armenians from southern Turkey, expelling thousands to French-mandate Syria. Fearing renewed persecution, the last Armenian communities of Cilicia fled after France ceded the territory to Turkey in 1939.

Many of the survivors who remained in Turkey were women and children who were subsequently endured forcible conversions, abuse, or hard labor without pay. Though Armenians in Constantinople faced discrimination, they were allowed to maintain their cultural identity, unlike those elsewhere in Turkey, who continued to face forced Islamization and kidnapping of girls after 1923.

== Distribution ==
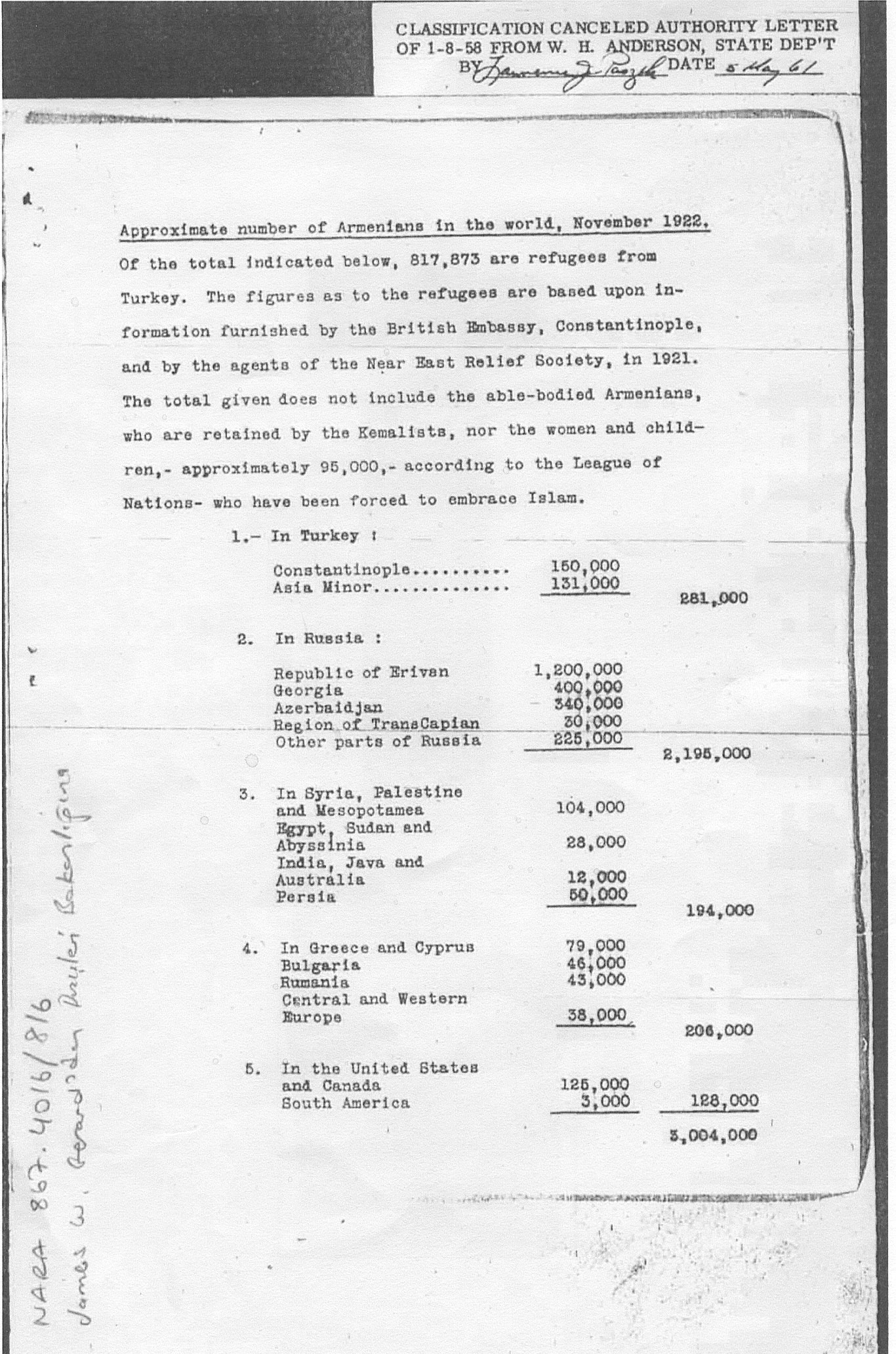
The US State Department document of the Armenian population in 1921

According to the U.S. Department of State, in 1922 there were 817,873 Armenian refugees who had originated from Turkey. This figure was based upon information provided by the British Embassy in Constantinople and 1921 data from the Near East Relief Society. The total given did not include able-bodied Armenians detained by Kemalist Turkey, nor Armenian women and children – approximately 95,000, according to the League of Nations – who have been forced to convert to Islam.

According to the same source, there were 281,000 Armenians still living in Turkey in 1921: 150,000 in Istanbul and 131,000 in Asia Minor.

=== Middle East ===
By 1925, nearly 275,000 Armenian refugees had fled to Middle Eastern territories not controlled by Turkey.

Population by country
Country	Refugees
Syria	100,000
Lebanon	50,000
Palestine & Jordan	10,000
Egypt	40,000
Iraq	25,000
Iran	50,000
Total	275,000

=== Eastern Armenia ===
An estimated 350,000 to 600,000 refugees fled from the Ottoman Empire to the new Armenian republic in Eastern Armenia. In addition due to the Pan-Turkic military actions, additional Armenian refugees fled from Azerbaijan and the North Caucasus. By late 1920, about 360,000 (almost half of Armenia's population of 720,000) or 200,000 refugees remained. This proved an insurmountable humanitarian issue for the First Republic of Armenia. Typhus was a major sickness, because of its effect on children. According to the data of the Ministry of Internal Affairs, 192,000 people died due to the typhus epidemic and famine by the summer of 1919.

Districts	Number of refugees
Yerevan	75,000
Ejmiatsin	70,000
Novo-Bayazit (Gavar)	38,000
Daralagyaz (Vayots Dzor)	36,000
Bash-Abaran (Aparan)	35,000
Ashtarak	30,000
Akhta - Yelenovka (Hrazdan - Sevan)	22,000
Bash-Garni (Garni)	15,000
Karakilisa	16,000
Dilijan	13,000
Armenia	350,000

The government of Hovhannes Kachaznuni was faced with a most sobering reality in the winter of 1918–19. The newly formed government was responsible for over half a million Armenian refugees in the Caucasus. It was a long and harsh winter. The homeless masses, lacking food, clothing and medicine, had to endure the elements. Many who survived the exposure and famine succumbed to the ravaging diseases. By the spring of 1919, the typhus epidemic had run its course, the weather improved and the first American Committee for Relief in the Near East shipment of wheat reached Batum. The British army transported the aid to Yerevan. Yet by that time some 150,000 of the refugees had perished. Vratsian puts this figure at around 180,000, or nearly 20% of the entire nascent Republic. A report in early 1919 noted that 65% of the population of Sardarabad, 40% of the population of eight villages near Etchmiadzin and 25% of the population of Ashtarak had died.

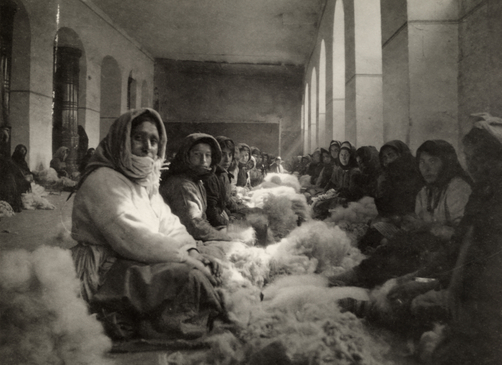
Armenian refugees from Turkey carding wool in Tiflis, Georgia. Photograph by Melville Chater from the National Geographic Magazine, 1920.

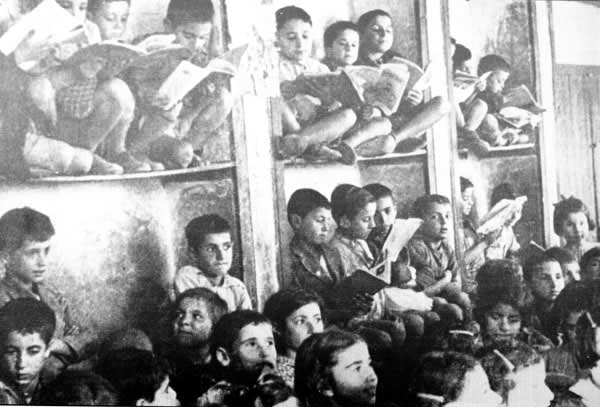
Armenian refugees in Aleppo, Syria

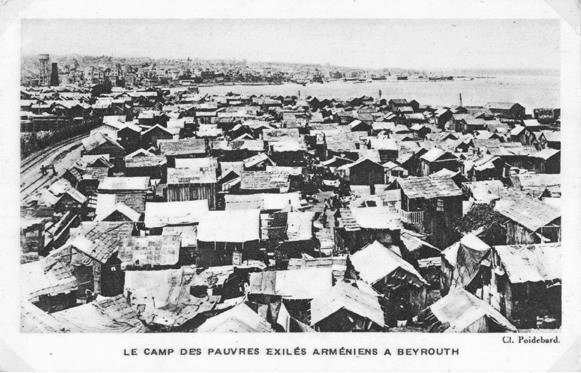
Armenian refugee camp In Beirut, Lebanon

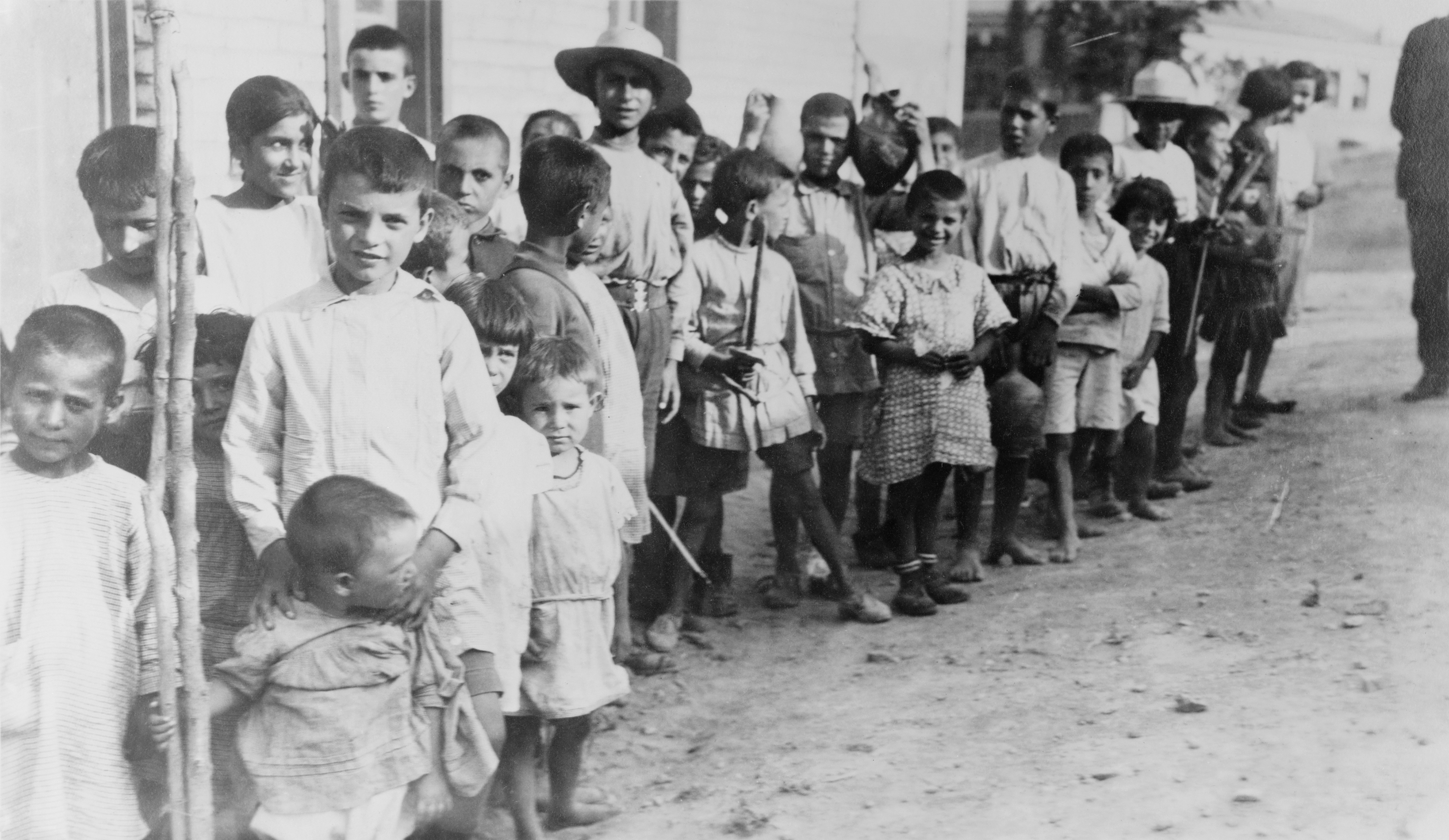
Greek and Armenian refugee children near Athens, Greece, in 1923, following their expulsion from Turkey

== Notable survivors ==
- Hrachia Acharian
- Vahram Alazan
- Aris Alexanian
- Grigoris Balakian
- Pailadzo Captanian
- Kegham Djeghalian
- Arshile Gorky
- Hambarsoom Grigorian
- J. Michael Hagopian
- Katherine Magarian
- Gurgen Mahari
- Aurora Mardiganian
- Yevnige Salibian
- Simon Simonian
- Soghomon Tehlirian
- Kourken Yanigian
- Haig Artin Kojababian
- Nairi Zarian
- Franzi Avetisyan
- Krikor Derderian
- Shooshanig Palanjian Derderian
- Mugerdich Derderian
- Araxie Derderian Derderian

== Documentary films ==
- 2011 – Grandma's Tattoos (dir. Suzanne Khardalian)

== See also ==
- Armenian diaspora
- White Genocide

== Sources ==
- Bozarslan, Hamit [in French]; Duclert, Vincent [in French]; Kévorkian, Raymond H. (2015). Comprendre le génocide des arméniens – 1915 à nos jours [Understanding the Armenian genocide: 1915 to the present day] (in French). Tallandier. ISBN 979-10-210-0681-2.
- Cheterian, Vicken (2015). Open Wounds: Armenians, Turks and a Century of Genocide. Hurst. ISBN 978-1-84904-458-5.
- "Richard Hovannisian to Discuss First Republic of Armenia at Lecture in Belmont". The Armenian Weekly. 3 November 2015.
- Herzig, Edmund; Kurkchiyan, Marina (2005). The Armenians: Past and Present in the Making of National Identity. London: RoutledgeCurzon. ISBN 0-203-00493-0. OCLC 229988654.
- Hovannisian, Richard G. (1982). The Republic of Armenia. Vol. 2: From Versailles to London, 1919–1920. Berkeley: University of California Press. ISBN 978-0520041868.
- Kazemzadeh, Firuz (1951). The Struggle for Transcaucasia (1917–1921). New York City: Philosophical Library. OCLC 1943521.
- Kévorkian, Raymond (2020). "The Final Phase: The Cleansing of Armenian and Greek Survivors, 1919–1922". Collective and State Violence in Turkey: The Construction of a National Identity from Empire to Nation-State. Berghahn Books. pp. 147–173. ISBN 978-1-78920-451-3.
- Nichanian, Mikaël [in French] (2015). Détruire les Arméniens. Histoire d'un génocide [Destroying the Armenians: History of a Genocide] (in French). Presses Universitaires de France. ISBN 978-2-13-062617-6.
- Petrosyan, Gegam (2012). Отношения Республики Армения с Россией (1918- 1920 гг.) [Relations of the Republic of Armenia with Russia (1918–1920)] (in Russian). Yerevan: Yerevan State University Publishing House.
- Suciyan, Talin (2015). The Armenians in Modern Turkey: Post-Genocide Society, Politics and History. I.B. Tauris. ISBN 978-0-85772-773-2.
- Suny, Ronald Grigor (1993). Looking Toward Ararat: Armenia in Modern History. Bloomington: Indiana University Press. ISBN 9780253207739.
- Walker, Christopher J. (1990). Armenia: The Survival of a Nation (revised 2nd ed.). New York: St. Martin's Press. ISBN 9780312042301.
