= Avetik Chalabyan =

Armenian management consultant and social entrepreneur (born 1972)

- Born: November 21, 1972 (age 53)
- Education: Yerevan State University (1994) and University of North Carolina (2001)
- Organization(s): McKinsey & Company

Avetik Chalabyan (Armenian: Ավետիք Չալաբյան, born 21 November 1972) is an Armenian public figure and politician, coordinator of HayaQve National Civic Initiative. Since 2012, he has been participating in and leading political opposition initiatives in Armenia.

== Biography ==
Avetik Chalabyan is a former senior partner of McKinsey & Company. Graduated from Yerevan State University with a master's degree in Theoretical Physics and received his MBA from the University of North Carolina. Chalabyan led McKinsey's Metallurgical Practice in CIS and Eastern Europe region from 2010 to 2015, and global Metallurgical Practice from 2015 to 2020. He was a supervisory board member of Metinvest, metals and mining group based in Netherlands. Also served as Head of the WTO Affairs Department at the Ministry of Economic Development of Armenia.

Chalabyan is a co-founder and a member of the board of trustees of Arar Foundation. He also serves as a board member in Repat Armenia Foundation.

== Public and Political activism ==
Chalabyan co-founded the National Agenda Party in 2018. He left the party in 2020 after the 44-day war. Afterwards he was involved in a number of opposition movements in Armenia, such as the "Unification" initiative implemented in support of Artsakh. Chalabyan was outspoken and critical about supporting and recognizing Artsakh, consolidation of Armenian diaspora, as well as building a stronger defense system to assure the sovereignty of the state.

Chalabyan criticized the erosion of democratic institutions in Armenia, advocating for an independent judiciary, the rule of law, and the protection of political and economic freedoms. In addition, he has actively supported educational reform, initiating programs to modernize curricula and provide internationally recognized educational opportunities for Armenian students.

== HayaQve Initiative ==
In May 2023, Chalabyan co-initiated the civil-legislative initiative Hayakve (Armenian Vote) being the coordinator of its operating headquarters. Launched on June 29, 2023, Hayaqve aimed to mobilize public support to criminalize any recognition of Artsakh (Nagorno-Karabakh) as part of Azerbaijan and denial or belittling of the Armenian genocide. The initiative, supported by 66 civic activists, collected over 58,000 signatures, exceeding the required 50,000 to submit the legislative proposal to Armenia's National Assembly. The proposed amendments to the Criminal Code would impose 10 to 15 years of imprisonment for actions recognizing Artsakh as part of another state or denying the Armenian Genocide. Despite allegations of administrative obstruction, including refusal of municipal premises for signature collection, the initiative highlighted public resistance to government policies regarding Artsakh. Chalabyan criticized the Armenian government's stance on border demarcation and handling of the Artsakh crisis, advocating for national unity, international support, and the preservation of Artsakh’s Armenian identity. His activism extended to opposing the extradition of Armenian soldiers and commanders to Azerbaijan and urging global powers to address Azerbaijan's actions against Artsakh.

== Political persecution against Avetik Chalabyan ==
In May 2022, during the Resistance Movement, he was detained on charges of allegedly offering material incentives to the chairman of the Student Council of the National Agrarian University of Armenia to attend rallies. He was released on bail in July 2022. In September 2024, the Court of Appeal vacated the conviction and ordered a retrial.

This criminal case was widely criticized by both domestic and international human rights initiatives. The U.S. Department of State, in its 2022 Annual Report on Human Rights in Armenia, categorized Avetik Chalabyan's detention as an instance of arbitrary deprivation of liberty. In its 2024 report, the Monitoring Committee of the Parliamentary Assembly of the Council of Europe, in reference to Chalabyan’s arrest, noted that encouraging participation in assemblies should not be subject to criminal regulation unless such encouragement conflicts with laws establishing proportionate restrictions on campaign financing.

On June 23, 2026, new public criminal proceedings were initiated against Avetik Chalabyan under Article 43-210, Part 2, Clauses 5 and 6 of the RA Criminal Code, charging him with preparation to obstruct the exercise of voting rights of a group of people. Chalabyan rejected the charges, characterizing them as entirely false.

In the lead-up to Avetik Chalabyan's detention, an unverified and edited audio recording surfaced on June 6, 2026—the day of electoral silence preceding the Parliamentary elections—on Baghramyan 26, a Telegram channel associated with pro-government narrative dissemination, where Chalabyan is allegedly holding discussions with Russian-speaking individuals concerning the upcoming Parliamentary elections in Armenia. Both the origin and the authenticity of the recording remain undetermined.

According to human rights advocates, the selection of pretrial detention as a preventive measure against Avetik Chalabyan serves not to ensure the smooth course of the investigation, but rather as a punishment—a practice explicitly prohibited under domestic legislation and international conventions. Furthermore, a ban on visits from Chalabyan’s family members—including his underage child—and Members of the National Assembly has been imposed. Human rights advocates have characterized these restrictions as a deliberate attempt to completely isolate and psychologically pressure the political figure.

== Criticism of the Criminal Case ==
The US Embassy in Armenia included Chalabyan's case in 2022 Human Rights Report as an example of arbitrary arrest by the local authorities.

Parliamentary Assembly of the Council of Europe addressed the case of Chalabyan stressing the problematic nature of the Armenian criminal law noting that incentivizing participation in rallies should not be criminalized and the use made of the criminal code in this case is disturbing.

Freedom House reported it is unusual move that court banned activist Avetik Chalabyan from participating in public rallies for two years.

== Personal life ==
Avetik Chalabyan is married and has four children.
