= Armenian Volunteer Corps =

Armenian volunteer placement organization

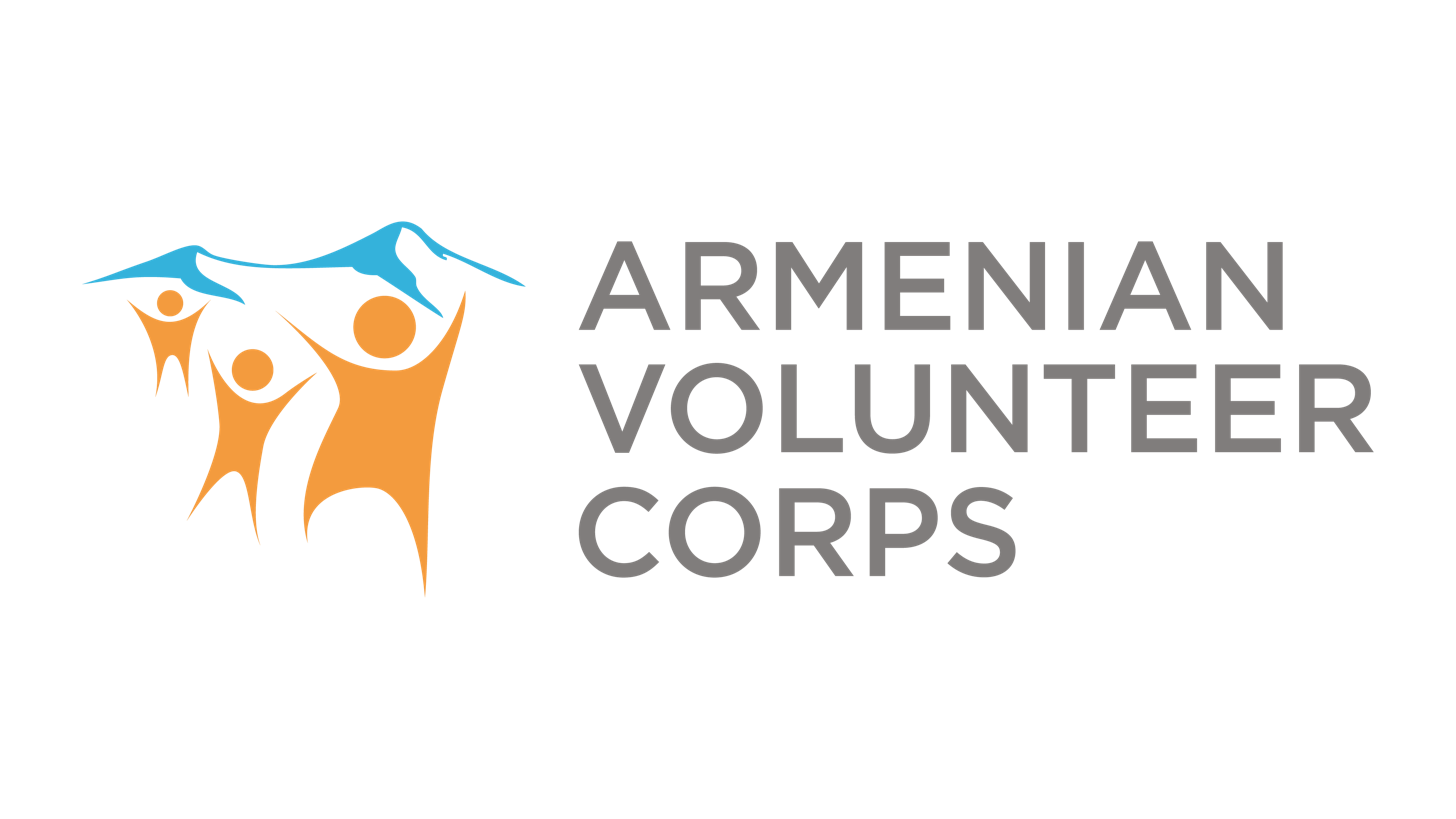
- Abbreviation: AVC
- Founded: 2000
- Founder: Father Hovnan (Jason) Demerjian; Tamar Hajian; Dr. Tom Samuelian
- Type: Humanitarian; Economic development
- Location: Yerevan, Armenia
- Region served: Armenia
- Key people: Arina Zohrabian, Executive Director
- Website: www.armenianvolunteer.org

Armenian Volunteer Corps (AVC) is a volunteer placement organization based in Yerevan, Armenia. The organization offers opportunities to individuals aged 21+ from around the world to come to Armenia to perform short or long-term volunteer service to participate in the country's economic and social development.

== Organizational background ==
The Armenian Volunteer Corps was founded in 2000 by Father Hovnan (Jason) Demerjian, a former U.S. Peace Corps volunteer in Armenia, Tamar Hajian, and Dr. Tom Samuelian.

The organization provides opportunities such as cross-cultural training, volunteer placement support, community service projects, and matching volunteers with professional internship and volunteer service opportunities in various areas such hospitals, public policy institutions, schools, cultural organizations, telecentres, newspapers, summer camps, community development organizations, government ministries, and orphanages.

In addition to customized placements, the Armenian Volunteer Corps provides a variety of support services to help volunteers seamlessly integrate into life in Armenia, including pre-service orientation and support throughout service, affordable host family options, free of charge Armenian language classes, weekly excursions to help discover the country, and other.

== Programs ==
=== Junior Corps Program ===
AVC's Junior Corps is open to individuals aged 21 to 31, regardless of their ethnicity, who seek volunteer or internship opportunities. Participants commit to a minimum stay of one month and can extend their service for up to one year. They are required to dedicate 30 hours per week to volunteer work with one or more of AVC's partner organizations. International students studying in Armenia may choose a reduced commitment of 20 hours per week if they are pursuing full-time studies.

=== Professional Corps Program ===
The Professional Corps caters to experienced professionals aged 32 to 59 who wish to contribute their expertise. Participants commit to a minimum stay of two weeks with a donation to AVC, and they can stay up to one year with no donation requirement. Volunteers commit a minimum of 20 hours per week to their field of expertise or a chosen field, allowing ample time for exploration and socializing.

=== Senior Corps Program ===
AVC's Senior Corps program is designed for individuals aged 60 and older. The program accommodates a minimum commitment of two weeks with a small donation or one month without a donation, with the possibility of extending their stay up to one year. Senior Corps members dedicate at least 20 hours per week to their chosen volunteer projects, collaborating with one or more of AVC's partner organizations.

== Partner organizations ==
AVC collaborates with a network of over 1,300 organizations spanning various sectors to offer diverse volunteer opportunities.

== See also ==
- Armenian General Benevolent Union
- Birthright Armenia
- Children of Armenia Fund
- Repat Armenia
