= Katherine Magarian =

Survivor of the Armenian genocide

Katherine (Chakoian) Magarian (April 10, 1906, Baghin-Palou/Բալու, Ottoman Empire; (present day Palu, Elazığ, Turkey) - December 27, 2000, North Kingstown, Rhode Island, United States) was a survivor of the Armenian genocide whose testimony was widely published.

== Biography ==
Katherine, the daughter of a businessman, was born in the village of Baghin, in Palou, Ottoman Empire, an Armenian enclave on the Euphrates River. She was nine years old at the start of the Armenian genocide, in April 1915. She witnessed the invasion of Turks and the initial systematic slaying of the male population of her village, among them her father. When the massacre ensued on the women and children of the village, Katherine, her two younger sisters and mother began to run, both of Katherine's sisters (one of them four years old) were captured, and her mother was hit, but able to keep running. Katherine and her mother were able to escape their village and death by fleeing on foot for three days through the mountains, to Harput, where the genocide would eventually engulf and separate them. An estimated 25 family members of Katherine's were murdered or kidnapped.

Katherine survived in the epicenter of the genocide for five years, by working in the home of a Turkish family, while her mother was kept hidden, nearby in the mountains. Around 1920, her mother returned to the Turkish family's home to retrieve Katherine and bring her to an Armenian orphanage in Beirut, where the Ottoman Empire had already lost power, nearing the end of World War I. For the next four years, Katherine was separated from her mother for a second time while living at the orphanage, until a priest would later reunite them; Followed by a third separation in 1924, when Katherine's mother left for the United States to meet family members that had emigrated there prior to the genocide.

In 1926, Katherine emigrated to Havana, Cuba with money from an uncle, to meet other family members. She was accompanied by John Magarian, a boy from her village (though she did not know him before the genocide), whom she had met in Beirut. John and Katherine married on June 3 of 1926 in Havana. In October 1927, Katherine gave birth to her first child, Mary, in Cuba and within two weeks moved to the United States by boat.

Katherine and John settled in Providence, Rhode Island, near Katherine's mother, her extended family and a large Armenian diaspora. Katherine's life in America would include having four more children (a total of five) and raising the four that survived past infancy, while John worked as a shoemaker. In her later years, Katherine became a self-taught crocheter and took care of her husband during his last years.

== Notability ==
Katherine was a notable Armenian Genocide survivor, whose personal testimony was first published in The Boston Globe article 'Voices of New England' in 1998. In the years following, her testimony was published in several books, including Hate Crimes by Laurie Willis; used as historical reference for genocidal literature; and most recently used for a children's book based on her testimony, entitled The Crochet Angel.

== See also ==
- Witnesses and testimonies of the Armenian genocide
