= National Agenda Party (Armenia) =

National Agenda Party Ազգային Օրակարգ կուսակցություն
- Leader: Avetik Chalabyan; Ara Hakobyan; Igor Zargaryan
- Founded: 24 December 2018
- Headquarters: Yerevan
- Ideology: Armenian nationalism Armenia-Artsakh unification
- Political position: Center-right
- National affiliation: Homeland Salvation Movement (2020-2021)
- Colours: Dark blue Gold
- Slogan: “Nation state, Healthy public, Competitive economy”
- National Assembly: 0 / 107

Website
- nationalagenda.am

National Agenda Party (Armenian: Ազգային Օրակարգ կուսակցություն, romanized: Azgayin Orakarg kusakts’ut’yun) is a political party in Armenia founded on 24 December 2018.

== History ==
The party did not participate in the 2018 parliamentary election. However, Ara Hakobyan did run as an open list candidate under the Armenian Revolutionary Federation's electoral list, but failed to win a seat.

On 9 November 2020, the party signed a joint declaration with the other member parties of the Homeland Salvation Movement calling on Prime Minister Nikol Pashinyan to resign during the 2020–2021 Armenian protests.

The party confirmed its intentions to participate in the 2021 Armenian parliamentary elections independently. Following the election, the party won just 0.06% of the popular vote, failing to win any political representation in the National Assembly. The party currently acts as an extra-parliamentary force.

== Ideology ==
The party supports the unification of Armenia and the Republic of Artsakh as a long-term solution to the Nagorno-Karabakh conflict.

During an interview in May 2018, party leader Avetik Chalabyan also stated that the National Agenda Party opposes authoritarianism, aims to strengthen Armenia's democracy and free speech, supports rural development, increasing the military budget, and encourages women to hold more prominent positions in Armenian politics.

== Founders ==
- Avetik Chalabyan – senior partner at McKinsey & Company, co-founder of Repat Armenia and the Arar Foundation.
- Ara Gasparyan
- Ara Hakobyan – diplomat, formerly Armenia's ambassador to several Asian countries.
- Igor Zargaryan – businessman, Armenia's former advisor to PM Tigran Sargsyan's on economic issues.
- Hayk Shekyan
- Vardan Marashlyan – executive director of Repat Armenia Foundation.

== Electoral record ==
=== Parliamentary elections ===
Election	Votes	%	Seats	+/–	Position	Government
2021	719	0.06	0 / 107	0	▲25th	Extra-parliamentary

== See also ==
- Programs of political parties in Armenia
- Politics of Armenia
