= Yevnige Salibian =

Ottoman Armenian Evangelical minister (1914–2015)

- Born: Yevnige Aposhian; January 14, 1914; Aintab, Ottoman Empire
- Died: August 29, 2015 (aged 101); Mission Hills, California, US
- Other names: Yevnigue Salibian
- Occupations: Evangelical minister, homemaker
- Known for: Armenian Genocide survivor
- Children: 6

Yevnige Aposhian Salibian (also spelled Yevnigue; January 14, 1914 – August 29, 2015) was an Ottoman Armenian Evangelical minister, homemaker, and centenarian most known for being one of the last-living Armenian genocide survivors.

== Early life and education ==
Yevnige Aposhian was born on 14 January 1914 in Aintab, Ottoman Empire, to Esther and Aposh Aposhian, a middle-class Ottoman Armenian family with 7 children. Her father was a copper merchant and a devout Christian.

In 1917, Aposhian witnessed Turkish gendarmes using whips to deport Armenian children during the genocide. In 1921, her family were among the last Christians to flee to Syria, traveling by 2 horse-drawn carts. She suffered a leg injury from falling off the cart in an accident that killed one person and left her unconscious for two days. Aposhian recovered in Aleppo. Her family settled in Damascus where she attended an Armenian Evangelical School. They later had to flee anti-Christian violence and moved to Beirut. Aposhian's mother died of malaria when she was 13.

Aposhian completed a high school diploma from the Armenian Evangelical School for Girls in Beirut.

== Career ==
In 1935, Salibian and her husband ministered to refugees, orphans, people with disabilities, and students with the Armenian Evangelical Church (AEC). They established an AEC congregation in Dora, Lebanon. After their emigration to the United States in 1976, the pair continued their ministry efforts. She was also a homemaker.

Salibian spoke at community events about the Armenian Genocide, especially for centennial commemorations.

== Personal life ==
In 1935, Aposhian married Evangelical preacher, Vahran (Vahram) Salibian. They moved to Ghazir where her husband worked at a Swiss institution for the blind. They had 6 children. In 1960, her eldest son, Norair, died in a road accident in Anjar that killed 21 of his high school classmates.

In 1976, Salibian and her family emigrated to the United States due to the Lebanese Civil War. They resided in San Jose, California. Her husband died in 1995.

In her last years, Salibian resided in an Armenian assisted living facility, Ararat Home, in Mission Hills, California. She died on August 29, 2015. At the time of her death, she was survived by 43 descendants.
