= Birthright Armenia =

Armenian young adult cultural exchange program

- Դեպի Հայք
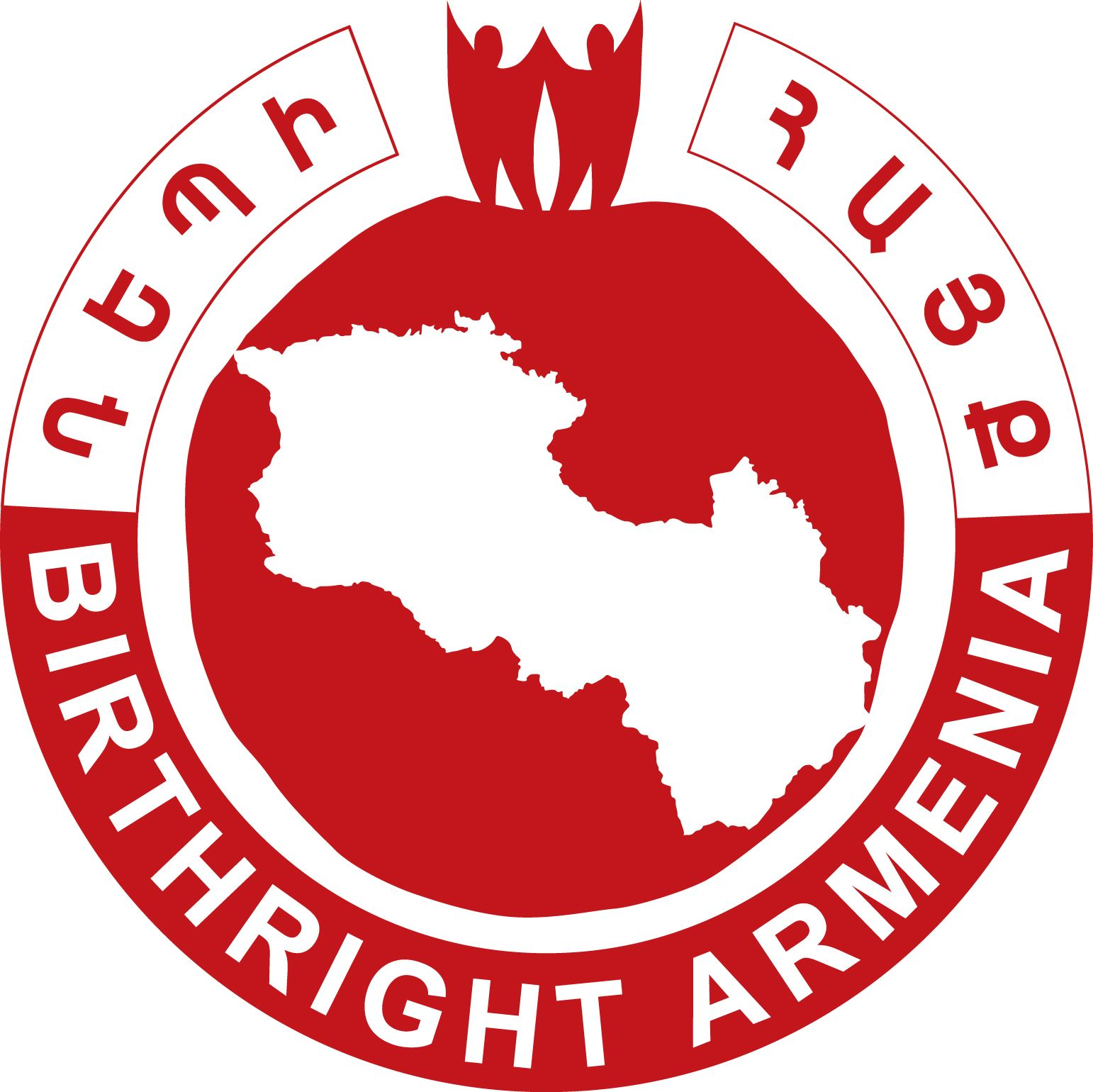
- Founded: 2003
- Founder: Edele Hovnanian
- Type: Educational charity; cultural exchange
- Purpose: Volunteerism
- Headquarters: Yerevan
- Region served: Armenia
- Key people: Linda Yepoyan, Board Member; Sevan Kabakian, Country Director
- Volunteers: 3000
- Website: Official website

Birthright Armenia, also known as Depi Hayk (Armenian: Դեպի Հայք), is a volunteer internship enhancement program for diaspora Armenians that also offers travel reimbursements to eligible participants to assist in the development of Armenia.

To volunteer with Birthright Armenia, the applicant has to be of Armenian heritage (at least one grandparent must be fully Armenian), between the ages of 21 and 32 years, and must have graduated from secondary school. The program operates year-round.

== Organizational background ==
Birthright Armenia was established in 2003 by Edele Hovnanian who realized that every Armenian should have the opportunity to immerse themselves in Armenia to understand its people, culture, and struggles. The organization's goals include strengthening ties between Armenia and the Armenian Diaspora youth representatives by providing them an opportunity to take part in the daily life of fellow Armenians. In 2007, the organization expanded its presence by opening an office in Gyumri. By 2012, in order to support the transition for alumni who move to Armenia, the "Pathway to Armenia program" was launched, which provided support with lodging and employment search. In 2013, Birthright Armenia further extended its reach by opening an office in Vanadzor. In 2015, the program celebrated a significant milestone by reaching 1,000 participants.

== Program ==
Participants commit to a minimum of 30 hours of weekly volunteering or a university internship while given the choice of residing with local host families. The organization offers a variety of volunteer opportunities among 1,300+ partner organizations across sectors such as architecture, marketing, tourism, healthcare, agriculture, IT, and business. The program also includes weekly excursions, in-office Armenian language classes, and weekly forums with guest speakers who talk about different topics regarding Armenia.

== Eligibility ==
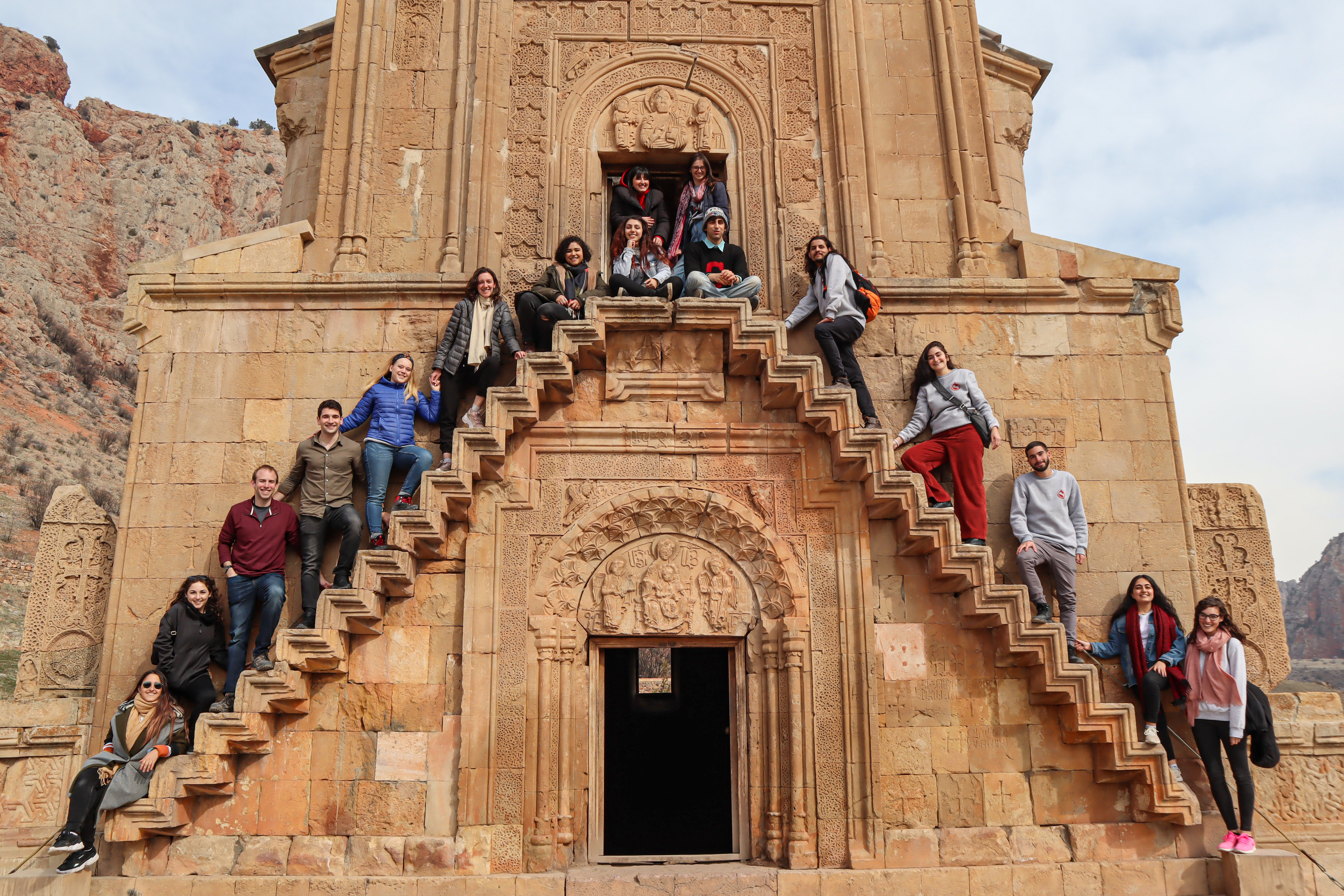
Birthright Armenia volunteers on excursion in Noravank monastery, March 2020

To participate, applicants must have at least one grandparent of Armenian ethnicity. They must also be aged between 21 and 32, having graduated from high school. Applicants born in Armenia must have left Armenia before the age of 15 and lived abroad for at least 10 years. Applicants who have primarily resided in Armenia for longer than the last three years are not eligible. Participants must agree to a minimum 9 week stay. Maximum program duration is one year. For the shorter term, there is a subsection of the program called Birthright Lite.

=== Birthright Lite ===
The organization has another option for full-time working professionals, regardless of age, who have limited time away from their jobs. They can apply to volunteer for four to nine weeks. Birthright Lite participants pay for travel, lodging, or host family costs.

== Alumni ==
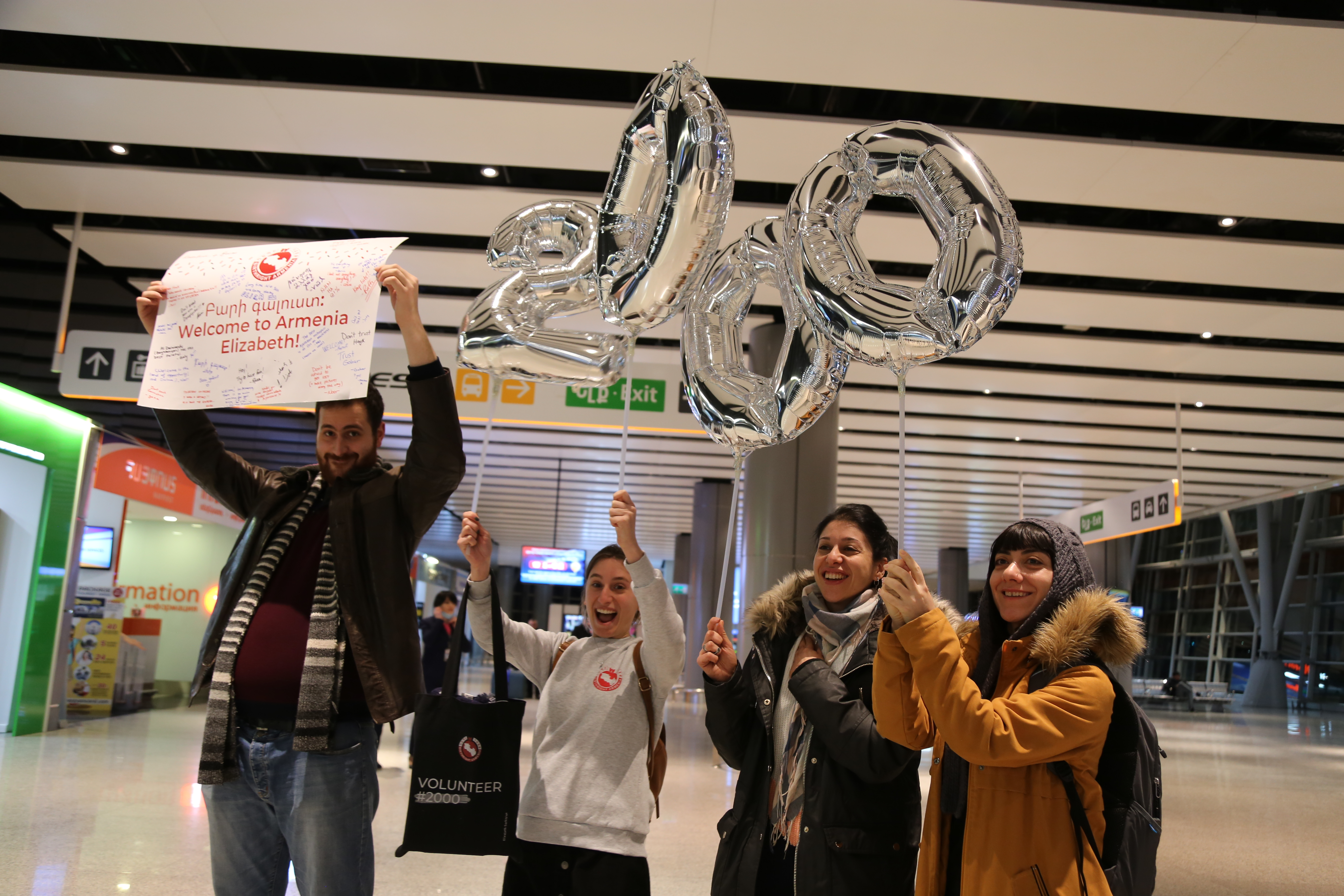
Meeting the 2000th volunteer at Zvartnots International Airport, February 2020

Birthright Armenia has an alumni network of more than 3000 individuals from 57 countries, 300 of which have repatriated to Armenia. The organization supports alumni initiatives through grants, which enable alumni to make positive impacts both in Armenia and around the world. Also, Birthright Armenia supports those who want to stay in Armenia after completing the program. Alumni can receive free temporary housing, as well as employment support, regular consultations with staff members, and access to a network of experienced repatriates.

== Similar organizations ==
Another similar project is Birthright Greece, aimed at the Greek Diaspora.

== See also ==
- Armenian Volunteer Corps
- Genealogy tourism
- Repat Armenia
- Repatriation of Armenians
