= Bethany Mooradian =

American author and lecturer

Bethany Mooradian (born December 15, 1975) is an American author, lecturer and internet personality. Her books include the home-based career guide I Got Scammed So You Don't Have To, The Work At Home Training Program, and The Mystery Shopper Training Program.

== Career ==
After graduating from Evergreen State College in Olympia, Washington, Mooradian worked in wide variety of short-lived positions, including a number of jobs as a mystery shopper. She parlayed her experiences into the 2003 book Become a Mystery Shopper. Updated editions were released in 2007 and 2009. In 2011, the book was developed into The Mystery Shopper Training Program and was released by Moreradiant Publishing both as a stand-alone book and as a book/CD-ROM set. Mooradian’s second book, the home-based job-searching guide I Got Scammed So You Don’t Have To was published in 2010 (Moreradiant) with a subsequent revision in 2012. In 2018 Moordian released The Work At Home Training Program 2018 as well as a re-release of The Mystery Shopper Training Program.

=== Website ===
In 2004, Mooradian created the "Queen of the Random Job" website. In the years following, the site has spun off to a career-oriented site, WorkAtHomeFAQ.com, and has been publishing regular blog posts since July, 2018.

=== Lawsuit ===
From 2002 to 2006, Mooradian taught Mystery Shopping classes through community education centers in the Detroit Metropolitan area using her book, Become a Mystery Shopper as the class textbook. Soon after her move to Seattle in 2006, two of her former students copied Become A Mystery Shopper book to sell as they started teaching similar classes. In February 2009, Mooradian filed a copyright infringement lawsuit in the Michigan Eastern District Court. In July 2011, a judgment was ordered in Mooradian's favor for an undisclosed sum.

== Awards ==
Mooradian's The Work at Home Training Program 2018 has won a number of book awards since its publication:

- 2018 Royal Dragonfly Book Awards – First Place
- Writer’s Digest 2019 Ebook Competition – First Place Overall, Non-Fiction
- San Francisco 2019 Book Awards – First Place, How-To
- Reader’s Views 2018 Book Awards – Second Place, How-To
- Reader’s Favorite 2019 Book Awards – Silver Medal, Non-Fiction Occupational
- Independent Author Network (IAN) 2019 Book Awards – Finalist, Career

Mooradian's The Mystery Shopper Training Program, 2018 has won a number of book awards since its publication:

- 2020 Royal Dragonfly Book Awards – First Place, How-To
- 2020 Writer's Digest 2020 Ebook Competition - Honorable Mention, Non-Fiction
