= Thomas J. Samuelian =

American linguist

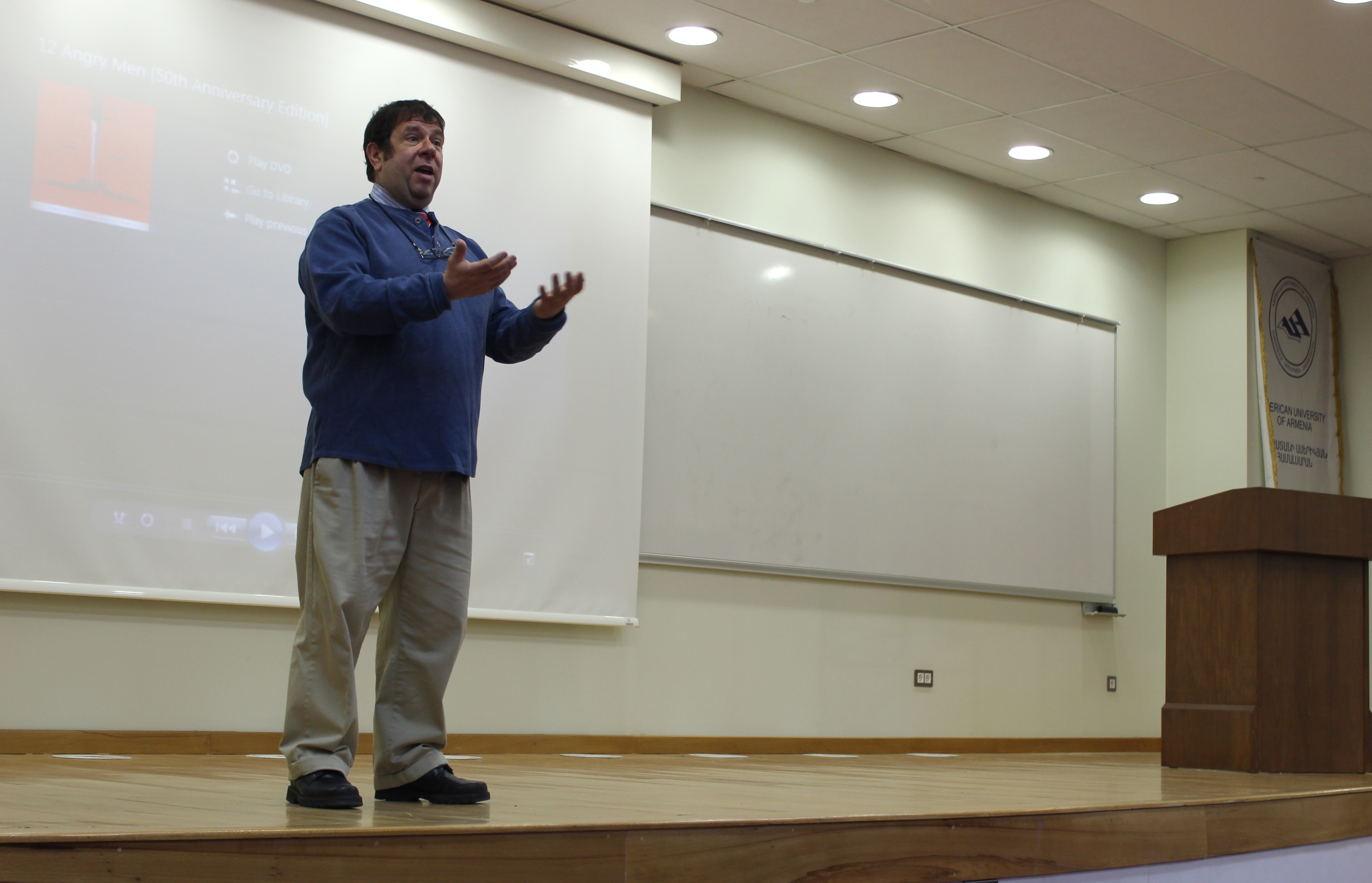
Thomas Samuelian during a lecture at American University of Armenia in 2014

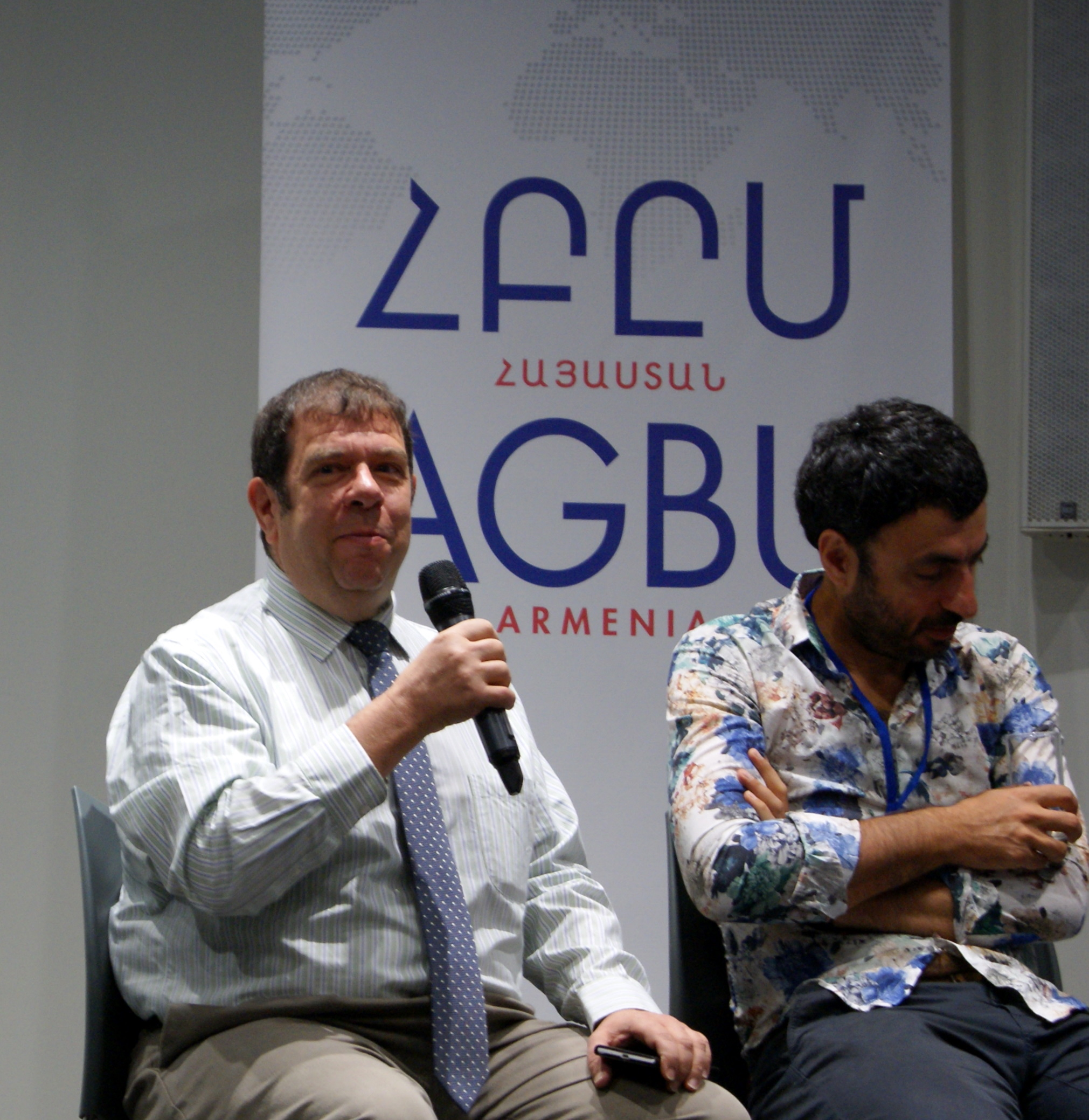
Wikimedia 2030 Strategy Armenian Forum

Thomas J. Samuelian is an American-Armenian linguist and author of a number of books and articles in the field of Armenian language, literature, and history.

== Career ==
Samuelian earned his BA and MA at the University of Pennsylvania. In 1977, he was awarded a Beinecke Scholarship. He earned a PhD in linguistics also from the University of Pennsylvania in 1978. During the 1980s, Samuelian taught at the University of Pennsylvania, Columbia University and St. Nersess Armenian Seminary.

In 1991, he earned a JD from Harvard Law School.

In 1998, he joined the faculty of the American University of Armenia where he later served as Dean of the LLM program and Dean of the College of Humanities & Social Sciences. He retired from the American University of Armenia in 2017.

In 2006, he was awarded the Order of Saint Sahak and Saint Mesrop by Karekin II, Supreme Patriarch and Catholicos of All Armenians.

He is a founder of the Arak-29 Foundation which promotes Armenian history, language and culture and frequently contributes translations and content to the site.

== Works ==
- 1982 - Medieval Armenian Culture, ISBN 0891307265
- 1989 - Course in Modern Western Armenian: Dictionary and Linguistic Notes, ISBN 0961793325
- 1989 - A Course in Modern Western Armenian: Exercises and Commentary, ISBN 0961793317
- 1993 - Armenian Dictionary in Transliteration: Western Pronunciation : Armenian-English English-Armenian ISBN 0961793333

== Translations ==
- 1986 - Refutation of the Sects (author Yeznik of Kolb), ISBN 0934728135
- 2005 - The Armenian Prayer Book of St. Gregory of Narek, ISBN 9993085340
- 2023 - David of Sassoun (author Hovhannes Toumanian) ISBN 1925937941
