= Repat Armenia =

Armenian non-profit organization

Repat Armenia Foundation
- «Վերադարձ Հայաստան» հիմնադրամ
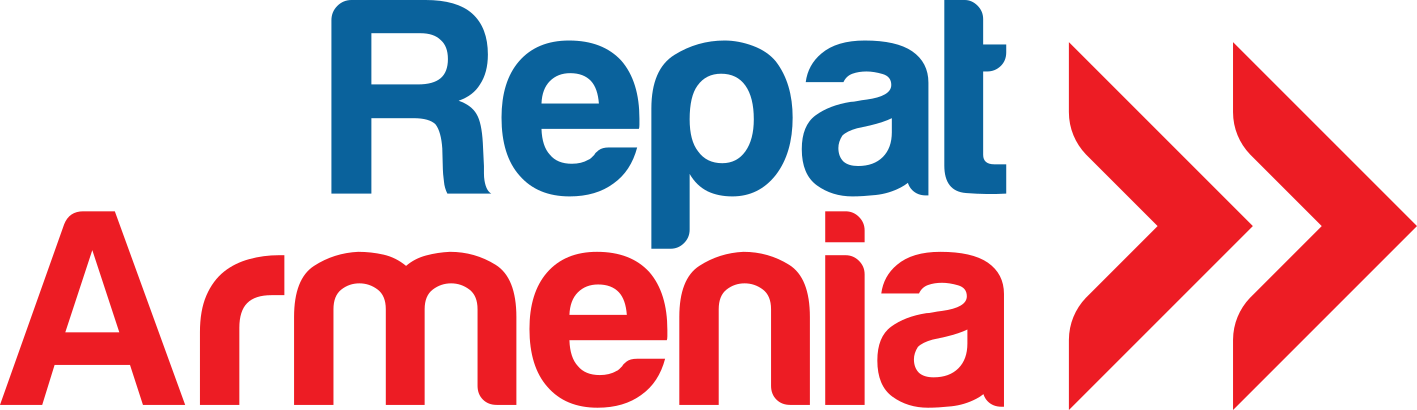
- Type: NGO, Nonprofit
- Headquarters: Yerevan, Armenia
- Chairman of the Board of Trustees: Edele Hovnanian
- Co-Founder and Executive Director: Vartan Marashlyan
- Website: repatarmenia.org/

Repat Armenia Foundation (Armenian: «Վերադարձ Հայաստան» հիմնադրամ) is a non-governmental, non-profit organization dedicated to promoting repatriation to Armenia and supporting the integration of individuals and families into Armenian society.

Founded in August 2012, the organization operates with a full-time staff based in Yerevan, along with a global network of supporters. The Foundation is fully funded by the H. Hovnanian Family Foundation.

== History ==
Repat Armenia was founded in 2012 by 12 like-minded repatriates and diasporans. The organization initially aimed to create an informational platform to provide potential repatriates with practical advice on various aspects of repatriation and integration. Over time, Repat Armenia evolved into an institution with a staff, offering individualized support to those considering repatriation.

== Services and programs ==
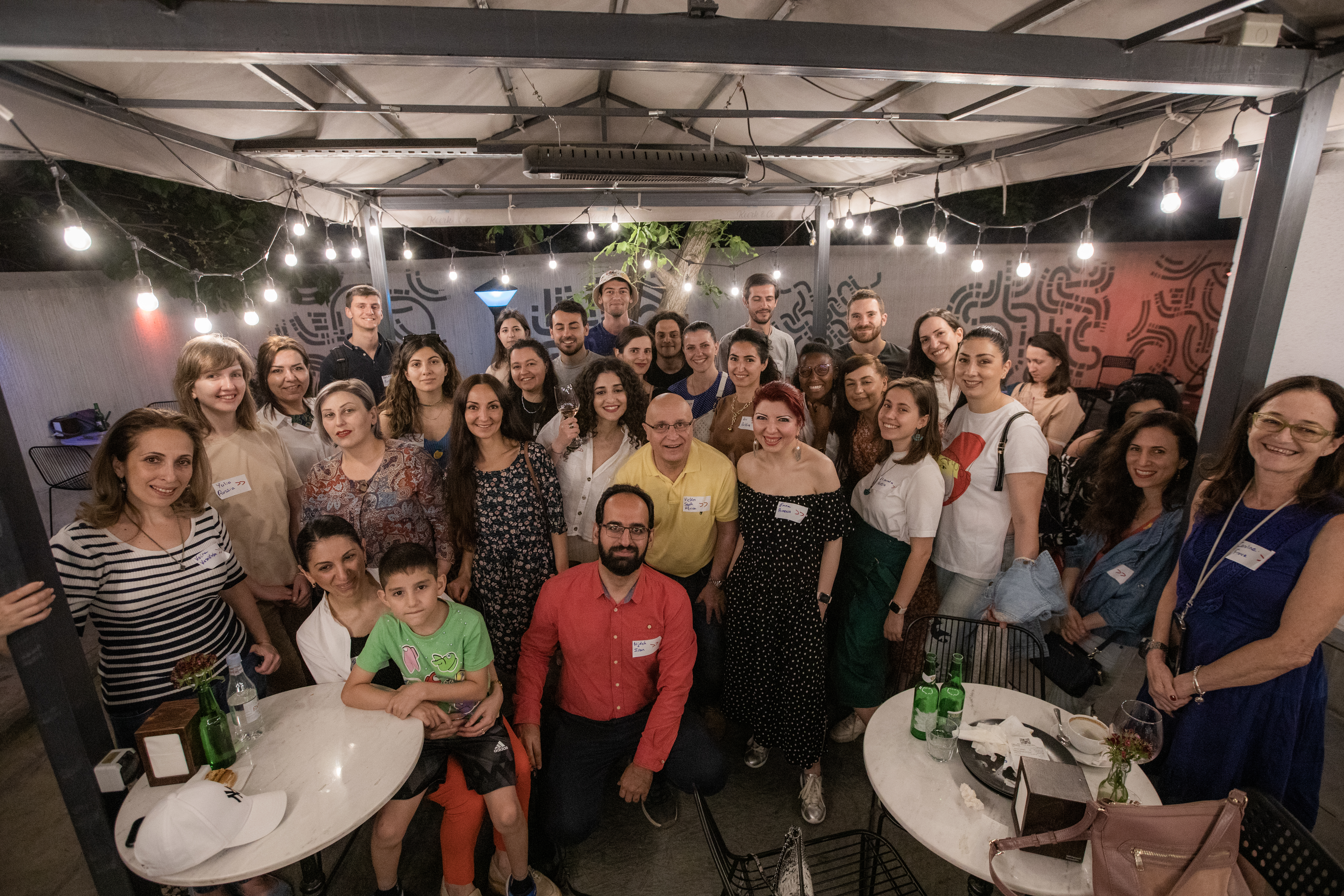
Regular networking meeting of repatriates and expats in Yerevan, April 2022

Repat Armenia provides a range of services for those considering a move to Armenia. These services include online and offline consultations introducing pre-repatriation programs and opportunities, covering repatriation and integration topics, information resources on moving, living, and working in Armenia, employment facilitation, networking and integration events, free Armenian language courses and Armenian speaking club, as well as a dedicated health insurance program for community members.

=== Past and Current Programs ===
==== Imagine Armenia Forums (2012-2019) ====
Repat Armenia has organized over 20 Imagine Armenia forums in key Armenian Diaspora communities around the world like Boston, Moscow, Kyiv, Toronto, Montreal, Tbilisi, Paris, Tehran and others. Armenian communities have had an opportunity to learn about the experiences of repatriates, different organizations and businesses that have succeeded in Armenia. During the forums, the audience would learn more about the volunteer and professional opportunities to work and gain experience in Armenia.

==== Siramark Business Directory (2016-2019) ====
In 2016, Repat Armenia created an Internet-based platform, which allowed users to quickly find information about the wide array of restaurants, shops and cafes owned by Syrian-Armenians in Yerevan. It also enabled Syrian business owners to broaden their clientele and to develop a better and sustainable client base. Besides basic contact and location information, the profile for each business includes a personal story about the founder and CEO, boosted with photos and/or videos about each in order to really make it a multimedia directory. More than 1000 Syrian-Armenians were engaged in this project.

==== Repat Start Up (2019) ====
The Repat Start Up Mentorship Program assisted innovative individuals who were ready to start a new project that would directly impact the development of Armenia. Participants received one-on-one professional mentorship tailored to their needs, and the program covered the cost of rent at a coworking space for a full year. Additionally, the program provided business, legal and accounting assistance as well as marketing and PR assistance in the form of meet-and-greet events, content on the Repat Armenia website, and interviews with different media outlets, as well as introductory networking with professionals in Armenia and the Diaspora․

==== Armenia Works 4U (2021-2022) ====
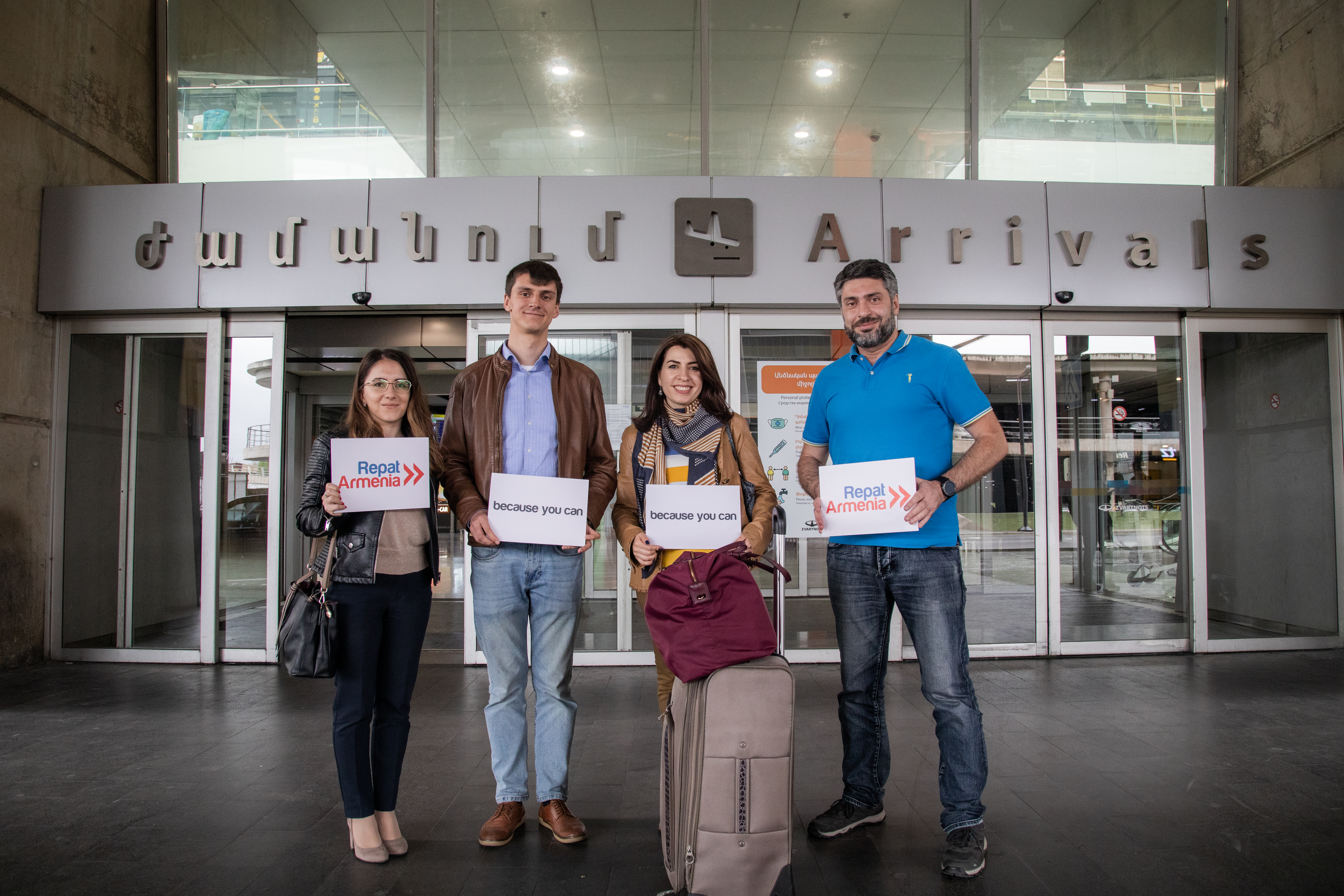
Meeting Armenia Works 4U program participant at Zvartnots International Airport, May 2022

The Repat Armenia Foundation successfully implemented a pilot program “Armenia Works 4U” at the end of 2021 for the professional repatriation of Lebanese Armenians. 80% of those repatriated under this program continued their careers in Armenia. Given the growing interest in repatriation and its exceptional importance for strengthening the Motherland, the program was expanded for Armenians living in Russia, Ukraine and Belarus in spring 2022. The program is currently on hold.

==== Free Armenian language courses (2021-present) ====
Repat Armenia's free-of-charge Armenian language courses are designed for recent repatriates' social and professional integration in Armenia. The courses available are:

- Elementary Armenian for Russian-speaking repatriates
- Elementary Armenian for English-speaking repatriates
- Intermediate Armenian
- Western Armenian to Eastern Armenian adaptation course
- Business Armenian

==== ՀայTalki - Armenian Speaking Club (2025-present) ====
ՀայTalki (HayTalki) is an Armenian speaking club in Armenia designed specifically for repatriates of Armenian descent who want to improve their spoken Armenian and feel more confident using the language in everyday life. Many diaspora Armenians who relocate to Armenia already understand Armenian but struggle with fluency, spontaneous speech, or professional communication. This program bridges that gap.

=== Engage Armenia Forum (2024-present) ===
Engage Armenia Forum is a traveling series of in-person events organized by Repat Armenia in partnership with the H. Hovnanian Family Foundation.

The Forum first took place across eight European cities (London, Amsterdam, Brussels, Paris, Alfortville, Geneva, Lyon, and Marseille) from March 6–13, 2024, attracting over 700 Diasporan Armenians. Another successful edition was held in Dubai on November 23, 2024, with 150 attendees. Most recently, the Forum was organized in Germany in November 2025, reaching 415 attendees across five cities.

Built around engaging pitches, breakout sessions, and networking, the Forum connects participants with speakers and representatives from Armenian organizations working in areas such as:

Social impact Volunteering and mentorship Entrepreneurship Education and healthcare Professional development Repatriation

The Forum aims to rethink and revitalize engagement with Armenia by offering practical opportunities for Armenians worldwide to contribute, regardless of their background or current location.

Previous participants have included organizations such as Birthright Armenia, Armenian Volunteer Corps, TUMO, Teach For Armenia, reArmenia, Impact HUB / VIA Fund, and others.

== Impact ==
The organization has a community of over 12,000 members, including repatriates and expatriates from various countries, as well as Diasporan Armenians. It receives approximately 1,000 requests for repatriation and integration assistance annually, with applicants spanning a wide range of backgrounds and nationalities.

=== Full Repatriation Guide to Armenia ===
Since 2021, Repat Armenia has published and annually updated a comprehensive guide for repatriation, offering practical information and guidance on various aspects of moving to, living in, and working in Armenia. The guide covers topics such as obtaining citizenship and residency, relocating belongings, registering an address, securing a social security number, enrolling in schools, opening bank accounts, obtaining health insurance, and finding accommodation. It is available in English, Russian and French.

== See also ==
- Armenian diaspora
- Armenian General Benevolent Union
- Armenian Volunteer Corps
- Birthright Armenia
- Repatriation of Armenians
