= White genocide (Armenians) =

Academic term used for the Armenian diaspora

White genocide (Armenian: սպիտակ ցեղասպանություն, romanized: spitak tseghaspanutyun, սպիտակ եղեռն, spitak yeghern or ճերմակ ջարդ, jermag chart, 'white massacre') is a descriptive term that is used in the Armenian diaspora, for the process of assimilation, especially in the Western world. The use of the word white is a reference to the bloodless loss of identity originating from nonviolent factors in contrast to red which would denote genocide by violence and represent bleeding.

During the late 19th and the early 20th centuries, the Armenians who lived in their ancestral lands that were then part of the Ottoman Empire were targeted for systematic extermination. From 1894 to 1896, up to 300,000 Armenians were killed in the Hamidian massacres. From 1915 to 1923, the Armenian genocide took the lives of around 1.5 million Armenians, who were killed by the Ottoman government.

The German political scientist Christoph Zürcher notes:

"Genocide" became a key word, which had several connotations. "White" genocide or "white" massacre denoted the repression, assimilation, or forced migration of Armenians from their historical lands (which were far larger than Soviet Armenia and included Karabakh, as well as areas belonging to contemporary Turkey).

Western Armenians consider Armenians who assimilate to the local population of the country to which they were eventually forced to emigrate (such as United States, France, Argentina, Brazil and Canada) as lost to their nation because of the continuing exile after the actual genocide itself, and they thus consider that lost Armenian to be another victim of the genocidal attempt to eliminate the Armenians.

The term has also been used by some Armenians to describe the discrimination and assimilation against Armenians since 1918 in Nagorno-Karabakh and Nakhchivan, which has caused Armenians to leave their homes. Some have also used it for Javakheti, which includes an Armenian population.

== See also ==
- Anti-Armenian sentiment
- Armenian diaspora
  - Armenians in Turkey
    - Hidden Armenians
- Armenian genocide recognition
- Cultural genocide
- Genocide prevention
- Hayhurum
- Hemshin people
- List of massacres of Armenians
- Silent Holocaust
- Forced assimilation in Azerbaijan
