= Armenian diaspora =

Communities of Armenians outside Armenia

Map of the Armenian diaspora in the world (includes people with Armenian ancestry or citizenship). For detailed statistics, see Armenian population by country. Armenia + 1,000,000 + 100,000 + 10,000 + 1,000

The Armenian diaspora are the communities of Armenians outside the Armenian highlands. Since antiquity, Armenians have established communities in many regions throughout the world. The Armenian diaspora is one of the oldest and largest diasporas in the world, with the oldest community being the Armenian Quarter of Jerusalem.

The modern Armenian diaspora was largely formed as a result of the genocide committed by the Ottoman Empire, which forced Armenians in Western Armenia to flee. From that point forward, Armenians became fundamentally a diaspora nation, with a majority of their people living outside their ancestral homeland.

Another wave of emigration from Eastern Armenia occurred in the 1990s amid the dissolution of the Soviet Union, the Turkish-Azeri blockade of Armenia, and an energy crisis. The High Commissioner for Diaspora Affairs established in 2019 is in charge of coordinating and developing Armenia's relations with the diaspora. The vast majority of ethnic Armenians worldwide do not live in the Republic of Armenia, and this has led to repatriation campaigns.

== Terminology ==
In Armenian, the diaspora is referred to as spyurk (pronounced [spʰʏrkʰ]), spelled սփիւռք in classical orthography and սփյուռք in reformed orthography. In the past, the word gaghut (գաղութ pronounced [ɡɑˈʁutʰ]) was used mostly to refer to the Armenian communities outside the Armenian homeland. It is borrowed from the Aramaic (Classical Syriac) cognate of Hebrew galut (גלות).

Armenians in Turkey, such as Hrant Dink, do not consider themselves a part of the Armenian Diaspora, since they have been living in their historical homeland for more than four thousand years. They are not considered part of the diaspora either by the Minister of Diaspora Hranush Hakobyan: "Diaspora represents all the Armenians who live beyond the Armenian Highland. In this context, we have singled out the Armenians of Istanbul and those living on the territory of Western Armenia. Those people have inhabited the lands for thousands of years, and they are not considered Diaspora."

== History ==
The Armenian diaspora has been present for over 1,700 years. The Armenian diaspora is divided into two communities – the communities from Anatolia (or Western Armenia) and the communities from the Caucasus or Eastern Armenia (Armenia, Azerbaijan, Georgia, Iran, and other communities from the former Soviet Union). Some Armenians in Crimea and in the Polish–Lithuanian Commonwealth switched to Turkic Armeno-Kipchak language.

The modern Armenian diaspora was largely formed during World War I as a result of the Armenian genocide. According to Randall Hansen, "Both in the past and today, the Armenian communities around the world have developed in significantly different ways within the constraints and opportunities found in varied host cultures and countries."

In the fourth century, Armenian communities already existed outside Greater Armenia. Diasporic Armenian communities emerged in the Achaemenid and Sassanid empires, and they also defended the eastern and northern borders of the Byzantine Empire. In order to populate the less populated areas of Byzantium, Armenians were relocated to those regions. Some Armenians converted to Greek Orthodoxy while retaining Armenian as their primary language, whereas others remained in the Armenian Apostolic Church despite pressure from official authorities. A growing number of Armenians migrated to Cilicia during the course of the eleventh and twelfth centuries as a result of the Seljuk Turk invasions. After the fall of the kingdom to the Mamelukes and loss of Armenian statehood in 1375, up to 150,000 went to Cyprus, the Balkans, and Italy. The Armenian diaspora is also notable for its historical mercantile communities throughout Asia in the Middle Ages and in the Early Modern Period, in countries such as China, India, and Iran, many of whom rose to high positions within the various Asian royal courts. Although an Armenian diaspora existed during Antiquity and the Middle Ages, it grew in size due to emigration from the Ottoman Empire, Iran, Russia, and the Caucasus.

Before 1870, 60 Armenian immigrants settled in New England. Armenian immigration rose to 1,500 by the end of the 1880s, and rose to 2,500 in the mid-1890s due to massacres caused by the Ottoman Empire. Armenians who immigrated to the United States before WWI were primarily from Asia Minor and settled on the East Coast.

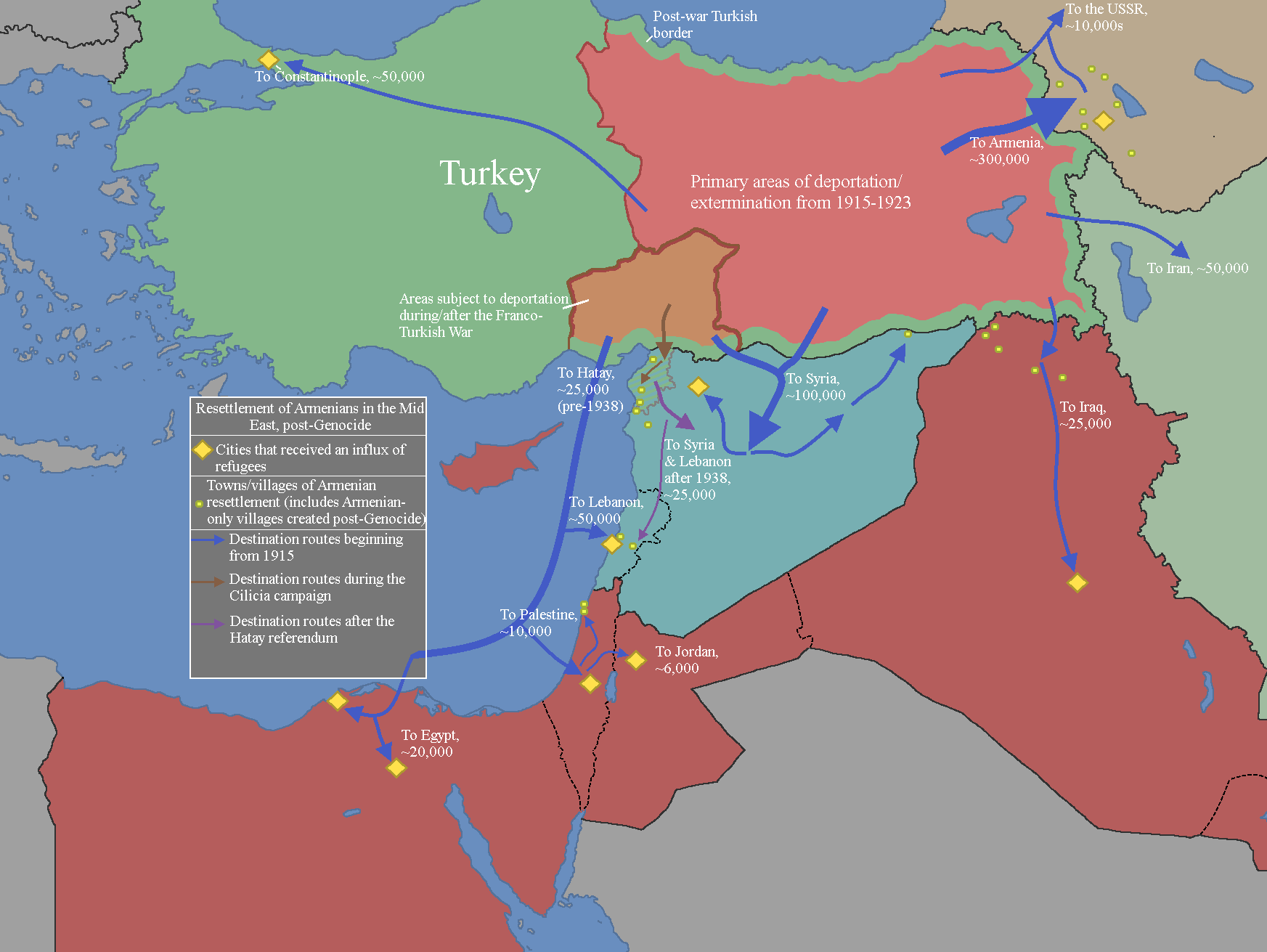
Routes of Armenian refugees during the 1920s and 1930s, including the exodus from the Hatay province.

The Armenian diaspora grew considerably both during and after the First World War due to the dissolution of the Ottoman Empire In the year 1910, over 5,500 Armenians immigrated to the United States, and by 1913, 9,355 more Armenians entered the North American borders. As World War I approached, the rate of Armenian immigration rose to about 60,000. In 1920 and until the Immigration Act of 1924, 30,771 Armenians came to the United States; the immigrants were predominantly widowed women, children, and orphans. Although many Armenians perished during the Armenian genocide, some of the Armenians who managed to escape established themselves in various parts of the world.

By 1966, around 40 years after the start of the Armenian genocide, 2 million Armenians still lived in Eastern Armenia, while 330,000 Armenians lived in Russia, and 450,000 Armenians lived in the United States and Canada.

In the United States, the rate of immigration increased after the Immigration Act was passed in 1965. The outbreak of the civil War in Lebanon in 1975 and the outbreak of the Islamic Revolution in Iran during 1978 were factors which pushed Armenians to immigrate. The 1980 U.S. Census reported that 90 percent of the immigration to the United States was undertaken by Iranian-Armenians during the years from 1975 and 1980.

The energy crisis in Armenia in the early 1990s also resulted in the emigration of 676,000-800,000 Armenians from the Caucasus.

== Distribution ==
Less than one third of the world's Armenian population lives in Armenia. Their pre-World War I population area was six times larger than that of present-day Armenia, including the eastern regions of Turkey, northern part of Iran, and the southern part of Georgia.

By 2000, there were 7,580,000 Armenians living abroad in total.

== See also ==
- Armenia–Azerbaijan relations
- Armenia–European Union relations
- Armenia–France relations
- Armenia–Georgia relations
- Armenia–Russia relations
- Armenia–Turkey relations
- Armenia–United States relations
- Foreign relations of Armenia
- Largest Armenian diaspora communities
- List of diasporas
- Office of the High Commissioner for Diaspora Affairs
- Visa requirements for Armenian citizens
- White genocide (Armenians)

== Sources ==
- Al-Rustom, Hakem Amer (2026). Enduring Erasures: Afterlives of the Armenian Genocide. Columbia University Press. ISBN 978-0-231-55995-9.
- Ayvazyan, Hovhannes (2003). Հայ Սփյուռք հանրագիտարան [Encyclopedia of Armenian Diaspora] (in Armenian). Vol. 1. Yerevan: Armenian Encyclopedia publishing. ISBN 5-89700-020-4.
- de Waal, Thomas (2003). Black Garden: Armenia and Azerbaijan Through Peace and War. New York: New York University Press. ISBN 978-0-8147-1945-9.
- Poghosyan, Mari; Madanmohan, Dr Prashant (2023-09-29). Armenian Legacy in India: Chronicles deciphering Indian and Armenian Cultural Legacies. Cognishift.
