= Garo (name) =

Garo, a common Armenian first name, shortened version of Karapet (Eastern Armenian) / Garabed (Western Armenian). For the Eastern Armenian variant of Garo, namely Karo, refer to Karo (name).

== Given name ==
=== Armenian ===
- Garo Antreasian (1922–2018), Armenian educator and printmaker
- Garo H. Armen (born 1953), Armenian American chairman and chief executive officer of Antigenics Inc
- Garo Hamamcıoğlu (born 1945), Turkish Armenian footballer
- Garo Kahkejian (1962–1993), a famed Armenian military commander
- Garo Mafyan (born 1951), Turkish Armenian musician and composer
- Garo Mardirossian (born 1956), Armenian-American attorney
- Garo Paylan (born 1972), Turkish Armenian politician and Member of Parliament
- Garo Sassouni (1889–1977), Armenian intellectual, author, journalist, revolutionary, educator, and public figure
- Garo Tavitjan (born 1982), Macedonian musician of Armenian origin
- Garo Yepremian (1944–2015), American football placekicker
- Garo Zakarian (1895–1967), Soviet Armenian composer and conductor

=== Others ===
- Garo Aida (born 1949), Japanese photographer known widely for his erotic work
- Garo, a character from the manga series One-Punch Man

== Surname ==
=== Armenian ===
- Armen Garo (1872–1923), Armenian nationalist politician
- Sherudo Garo, fictional character, antagonist of Time Crisis

=== Others ===
- Aminu Sule Garo (born 1962), Nigerian politician and businessman
- Ángel Garó (born 1965), Spanish actor and comedian
- Emma Garo, a lawyer and magistrate in the Solomon Islands
- Floriana Garo (born 1987), Albanian television presenter and model
- Isabelle Garo (born 1963), French philosopher
- John Garo (1952–2007), Solomon Islands politician
- Nasiru Sule Garo (born 1974), Nigerian politician, member of the Nigerian House of Representatives
- Orion Garo (born 1980), Albanian basketballer

== See also ==
- Karo (name)
