= Karapetyan =

Karapetyan, Karapetian, Garabetian, or Garabedian (Armenian: Կարապետյան , in Western Armenian Կարապետեան) is an Armenian surname. It can refer to:

== Garabedian ==
- Berge Garabedian, Canadian founder of JoBlo.com
- Charles Garabedian (1923–2016), U.S. artist
- Edna Garabedian, U.S. opera singer and director
- John Garabedian (born 1941), U.S. radio personality
- Khachadour Paul Garabedian (1836–1881), Ottoman-born Armenian-American Navy Sailor
- Margot Garabedian (born 1996), Cambodian triathlete
- Messia Garabedian (born 1993), Armenian singer and musician
- Mitchell Garabedian (born 1951), American lawyer known for representing sexual abuse victims
- Paul Garabedian (1927–2010), U.S. applied mathematician and numerical analyst
- Tina Garabedian (born 1997), Armenian-Canadian ice dancer
- Varoujan Garabedian (also as Varadjian Garbidjian, 1954–2019), Syrian-Armenian militant

== Garapedian ==
- Carla Garapedian (born 1961), U.S. (expatriate in the U.K.) documentary filmmaker

== Karapetian ==
- Aleksandre Karapetian (born 1987), Armenian footballer
- Farrah Karapetian (born 1978), American photographer
- Ferdinand Karapetian (born 1992), Armenian judoka

== Karapetyan ==
- Aleksander Karapetyan (born 1970), Armenian weightlifter
- Aleksandr Karapetyan (born 1987), Armenian footballer
- Andranik Karapetyan (born 1995), Armenian weightlifter
- Araksya Karapetyan (born 1982), Armenian-born American television personality and anchorwoman
- Aram Karapetyan (born 1964), Armenian politician
- Arshak Karapetyan (born 1967), Armenian major general
- Ashot Karapetyan (born 1999), Armenian alpine skier
- Elmira Karapetyan (born 1994), Armenian sports shooter
- Erik Karapetyan (born 1988), Armenian singer-songwriter
- Garik Karapetyan (born 2003), Armenian weightlifter
- Garnik A. Karapetyan (1958–2018), Armenian scientist and mathematician
- Gevorg Karapetyan (born 1963), Lebanese-Armenian footballer
- Gevorg Karapetyan (born 1990), Armenian footballer
- Harut Karapetyan (born 1972), Armenian footballer
- Hasmik Karapetyan (born 1977), Armenian singer
- Karapet Karapetyan (born 1982), Armenian kickboxer
- Karen Karapetyan (born 1963), former Armenian Prime Minister
- Maria Karapetyan (born 1988), Armenian politician and member of the National Assembly of Armenia
- Movses Karapetyan (born 1978), Armenian Greco Roman wrestler
- Ruben Karapetyan, Armenian diplomat, historian, author, ambassador, historical scientist and professor
- Saak Albertovich Karapetyan (1960–2018), Russian politician
- Sahak Karapetyan (1906–1987), Soviet and Armenian physiologist and politician
- Samvel Karapetyan, multiple people
- Sargis Karapetyan (born 1990), Armenian midfielder
- Sergo Karapetyan (1948–2021), Armenian politician and agricultural minister
- Shavarsh Karapetyan (born 1953), Soviet Armenian finswimmer
- Tigran Karapetyan (1945–2021), Armenian politician

== See also ==
- Karapet / Garabed
