= Armenian verbs =

Armenian language component

The verbal morphology of Armenian is complicated by the existence of two main dialects, Eastern and Western. The following sketch will be a comparative look at both dialects.

== Non-finite forms ==
=== Infinitive ===
The infinitive of Armenian verbs is formed with the stem, the theme vowel, and the affix -լ (-l).

The endings reflect the number of conjugations possible. Western Armenian is conservative, retaining three conjugations in a, e, and i, while Eastern Armenian has collapsed I and II:

Infinitive
Class	Western	Eastern	gloss
I (e-stem)	սիրել sirel	սիրել sirel	to love
II (i-stem/e-stem)	խօսիլ xōsil	խոսել xosel	to speak
III (a-stem)	կարդալ gartal	կարդալ kardal	to read

=== Stems ===
There are two main stems per verb, the present stem and past stem. For conjugations I/II, the past stem is identical to the present stem, which is basically the verb minus the theme vowel and ending:

Stem		Western	Eastern
Class I	present/past	սիր- sir-	սիր- sir-
Class II	present/past	խօս- xōs-	խոս- xos-
Class III	present	կարդ- gart-	կարդ- kard-
Class III	past	կարդաց- gartac῾-	կարդաց- kardac῾-

The augment for the third conjugation is sometimes in -եց (-ec῾).

=== Participles ===
The number and type of participles varies by dialect.

==== Future participle ====
Both Eastern and Western Armenian form the common future participle in -լու (-lu). Western Armenian has one additional future participle in -լիք (-lik῾):

==== Present and past participles ====
===== Present =====
Eastern Armenian has three present participles, while Western Armenian has one. The two exclusively Eastern present participles are in -ում (-um) (for all verb classes) and -լիս (-lis); both affixes attach to the present stem. Eastern and Western Armenian have a common present participle -ող (-oġ), which attaches to the past stem; it is sometimes used as an agentive noun: ուսանող (usanoġ student) [fr. ուսանել usanel to study)].

===== Past =====
All affixes here attach to the past stem. Both dialects have a common past passive participle in -ած (WA -aj/EA -ac). Where the dialects differ is the past active participle. The Western Armenian participle is -եր (-er) for all conjugations, while Eastern Armenian has -ել (-el).

Participle Table
Participle		Western			Eastern		
Present	I	սիրող siroġ	խօսող xōsoġ	կարդացող gartac῾oġ	սիրող siroġ	խոսող xosoġ	կարդացող kardac῾oġ
Present	II	--			սիրում sirum	խոսում xosum	կարդում kardum
Present	III	--			սիրելիս sirelis	խոսելիս xoselis	կարդալիս kardalis
Future	I	սիրելու sirelu	խօսելու xōselu	կարդալու gartalu	սիրելու sirelu	խոսելու xoselu	կարդալու kardalu
Future	II	սիրելիք sirelik῾	խօսելիք xōselik῾	կարդալիք gartalik῾	--		
Past Active		սիրեր sirer	խօսեր xōser	կարդացեր gartac῾er	սիրել sirel	խոսել xosel	կարդացել kardac῾el
Past Passive		սիրած siradz	խօսած xōsadz	կարդացած gartac῾adz	սիրած sirac	խոսած xosac	կարդացած kardac῾ac

== Finite forms ==
=== Introduction: general overview ===
Armenian features within its verbal system a system that encodes person and number, as well as tense, mood, and aspect (see following section for more.)

Armenian inherited from Indo-European two sets of synthetic affixes corresponding roughly to a "present" or general series, and a past series:

Armenian General Affixes
	Present	Past
1st person singular	-մ -m	-ի -i
2nd person singular	-ս -s	-իր -ir
3rd person singular	-Ø / -յ Ø	-ր -r
1st person plural	-նք -nk῾	-ինք -ink῾
2nd person plural	-ք -k῾	-իք -ik῾
3rd person plural	-ն -n	-ին -in

How these affixes are used varies between the two modern dialects of Armenian.

=== Tense/mood/aspect ===
Both dialects have five moods: indicative, conditional, optative/subjunctive, necessitative, imperative; of these only the imperative has no tense distinction. The number of tenses varies by dialect. Aspect is divided roughly the same in both dialects, but the distribution is slightly different.

==== Indicative mood ====
Both Eastern and Western feature one present, one future, and two past tenses (imperfect, preterite). Their formation varies by dialect.

===== Present =====
Formation of the present tense differs between Eastern and Western. In form, the present indicative of Eastern Armenian has no corresponding Western formation. However, the Western present indicative is formed identically to the Eastern present conditional.

Eastern Armenian uses the -ում (-um) participle with the present tense of Eastern Armenian verb լինել (linel "to be"). Western Armenian uses a synthetic general form of the verb preceded by the particle կը gë /gə/. The synthetic form conjugates according to the verb's theme vowel (i.e., e, i, or a).

Present Indicative
Eastern	Pronoun					
gloss	1sg. ես yes (I)	2sg. դու du (thou/you)	3sg. նա na (he/she/it)	1pl. մենք menk῾ (we)	2pl. դուք duk῾ (you (ye))	3pl. նրանք nrank῾ (they)
to love Class I	սիրում եմ sirum em	սիրում ես sirum es	սիրում է sirum ē	սիրում ենք sirum enk῾	սիրում եք sirum ek῾	սիրում են sirum en
to speak Class II	խոսում եմ xosum em	խոսում ես xosum es	խոսում է xosum ē	խոսում ենք xosum enk῾	խոսում եք xosum ek῾	խոսում են xosum en
to read Class III	կարդում եմ kardum em	կարդում ես kardum es	կարդում է kardum ē	կարդում ենք kardum enk῾	կարդում եք kardum ek῾	կարդում են kardum en
Western	Pronoun					
gloss	1sg. ես yes (I)	2sg. դուն tun (thou/you)	3sg. ան an (he/she/it)	1pl. մենք menk῾ (we)	2pl. դուք tuk῾ (you (ye))	3pl. անոնք anonk῾ (they)
to love Class I	կը սիրեմ gë sirem	կը սիրես gë sires	կը սիրէ gë sirē	կը սիրենք gë sirenk῾	կը սիրէք gë sirek῾	կը սիրեն gë siren
to speak Class II	կը խօսիմ gë xōsim	կը խօսիս gë xōsis	կը խօսի gë xōsi	կը խօսինք gë xōsink῾	կը խօսիք gë xōsik῾	կը խօսին gë xōsin
to read Class III	կը կարդամ gë gartam	կը կարդաս gë gartas	կը կարդայ gë garta*	կը կարդանք gë gartank῾	կը կարդաք gë gartak῾	կը կարդան gë gartan

- In Armenian, final /j/ in polysyllabic words is silent.

===== Imperfect =====
The formation of the imperfect is similar to the present-tense formation in both dialects. Eastern Armenian uses the -ում (-um) participle with the imperfect of verb լինել (linel "to be"). Western Armenian uses a synthetic imperfect form of the verb preceded by the particle կը gë /gə/.

Imperfect Indicative
Eastern	Pronoun					
gloss	1sg. ես yes (I)	2sg. դու du (thou/you)	3sg. նա na (he/she/it)	1pl. մենք menk῾ (we)	2pl. դուք duk῾ (you (ye))	3pl. նրանք nrank῾ (they)
to love Class I	սիրում էի sirum ēi	սիրում էիր sirum ēir	սիրում էր sirum ēr	սիրում էինք sirum ēink῾	սիրում էիք sirum ēik῾	սիրում էին sirum ēin
to speak Class II	խոսում էի xosum ēi	խոսում էիր xosum ēir	խոսում էր xosum ēr	խոսում էինք xosum ēink῾	խոսում էիք xosum ēik῾	խոսում էին xosum ēin
to read Class III	կարդում էի kardum ēi	կարդում էիր kardum ēir	կարդում էր kardum ēr	կարդում էինք kardum ēink῾	կարդում էիք kardum ēik῾	կարդում էին kardum ēin
Western	Pronoun					
gloss	1sg. ես yes (I)	2sg. դուն tun (thou/you)	3sg. ան an (he/she/it)	1pl. մենք menk῾ (we)	2pl. դուք tuk῾ (you (ye))	3pl. անոնք anonk῾ (they)
to love Class I	կը սիրէի gë sirēi	կը սիրէիր gë sirēir	կը սիրէր gë sirēr	կը սիրէինք gë sirēink῾	կը սիրէիք gë sirēik῾	կը սիրէին gë sirēin
to speak Class II	կը խօսէի gë xōsēi	կը խօսէիր gë xōsēir	կը խօսէր gë xōsēr	կը խօսէինք gë xōsēink῾	կը խօսէիք gë xōsēik῾	կը խօսէին gë xōsēin
to read Class III	կը կարդայի gë gartayi	կը կարդայիր gë gartayir	կը կարդար gë gartar	կը կարդայինք gë gartayink῾	կը կարդայիք gë gartayik῾	կը կարդային gë gartayin

Note that in all forms, Eastern and Western, that feature the combination էի (e.g., սիրում էիմ/կը սիրէիմ, etc.), there is an epenthetic yod: sirum ēi [siˈɹum eji] or [siˈɾum eji]; gë sirēi [ɡə siɾeˈji].

===== Future =====
Like the formation of the present tense, the future tense in Armenian intersects two varying constructions with opposite meanings. The Eastern future tense is made with the future participle in -լու (-lu) with the present tense of verb լինել (linel). (This Eastern form is identical to the Western Armenian non-past necessitative (see below.)) The Western future tense is made with the general synthetic verb preceded by the particle պիտի (bidi). (This Western form is identical to the Eastern Armenian non-past necessitative (see below.))

Future Indicative
Eastern	Pronoun					
gloss	1sg. ես yes (I)	2sg. դու du (thou/you)	3sg. նա na (he/she/it)	1pl. մենք menk῾ (we)	2pl. դուք duk῾ (you (ye))	3pl. նրանք nrank῾ (they)
to love Class I	սիրելու եմ sirelu em	սիրելու ես sirelu es	սիրելու է sirelu ē	սիրելու ենք sirelu enk῾	սիրելու եք sirelu ek῾	սիրելու են sirelu en
to speak Class II	խոսելու եմ xoselu em	խոսելու ես xoselu es	խոսելու է xoselu ē	խոսելու ենք xoselu enk῾	խոսելու եք xoselu ek῾	խոսելու են xoselu en
to read Class III	կարդալու եմ kardalu em	կարդալու ես kardalu es	կարդալու է kardalu ē	կարդալու ենք kardalu enk῾	կարդալու եք kardalu ek῾	կարդալու են kardalu en
Western	Pronoun					
gloss	1sg. ես yes (I)	2sg. դուն tun (thou/you)	3sg. ան an (he/she/it)	1pl. մենք menk῾ (we)	2pl. դուք tuk῾ (you (ye))	3pl. անոնք anonk῾ (they)
to love Class I	պիտի սիրեմ bidi sirem	պիտի սիրես bidi sires	պիտի սիրէ bidi sirē	պիտի սիրենք bidi sirenk῾	պիտի սիրէք bidi sirek῾	պիտի սիրեն bidi siren
to speak Class II	պիտի խօսիմ bidi xōsim	պիտի խօսիս bidi xōsis	պիտի խօսի bidi xōsi	պիտի խօսինք bidi xōsink῾	պիտի խօսիք bidi xōsik῾	պիտի խօսին bidi xōsin
to read Class III	պիտի կարդամ bidi gartam	պիտի կարդաս bidi gartas	պիտի կարդայ bidi garta*	պիտի կարդանք bidi gartank῾	պիտի կարդաք bidi gartak῾	պիտի կարդան bidi gartan

Note that in all Eastern forms that feature the combination ու + ե (e.g., կարդալու եմ, etc.), epenthetic yod appears: kardalu em [kaɹdaˈlujem] or [kaɾdaˈlujem].

===== Preterite =====
In various grammars, this is called the preterite, the perfect, or sometimes the aorist. Both Eastern and Western Armenian use a synthetic preterite, which is formed by deleting the infinitive marker and theme vowel, then:
· Class I and II verbs (in both dialects) add -եց (-ec῾);
· Class III verbs add -աց (-ac῾).

The preterite affixes are similar to the imperfect endings of the verb "to be" (Eastern լինել linel, Western ըլլալ ëllal)

In Class III verbs (a-thematic verbs), the preterite stem and the past stem are identical.

Preterite
Eastern	Pronoun					
gloss	1sg. ես yes (I)	2sg. դու du (thou/you)	3sg. նա na (he/she/it)	1pl. մենք menk῾ (we)	2pl. դուք duk῾ (you (ye))	3pl. նրանք nrank῾ (they)
to love Class I	սիրեցի sirec῾i	սիրեցիր sirec῾ir	սիրեց sirec῾	սիրեցինք sirec῾ink῾	սիրեցիք sirec῾ik῾	սիրեցին sirec῾in
to speak Class II	խոսեցի xosec῾i	խոսեցիր xosec῾ir	խոսեց xosec῾	խոսեցինք xosec῾ink῾	խոսեցիք xosec῾ik῾	խոսեցին xosec῾in
to read Class III	կարդացի kardac῾i	կարդացիր kardac῾ir	կարդաց kardac῾	կարդացինք kardac῾ink῾	կարդացիք kardac῾ik῾	կարդացին kardac῾in
Western	Pronoun					
gloss	1sg. ես yes (I)	2sg. դուն tun (thou/you)	3sg. ան an (he/she/it)	1pl. մենք menk῾ (we)	2pl. դուք tuk῾ (you (ye))	3pl. անոնք anonk῾ (they)
to love Class I	սիրեցի sirec῾i	սիրեցիր sirec῾ir	սիրեց sirec῾	սիրեցինք sirec῾ink῾	սիրեցիք sirec῾ik῾	սիրեցին sirec῾in
to speak Class II	խօսեցայ xōsec῾a	խօսեցար xōsec῾ar	խօսեցաւ xōsec῾av	խօսեցանք xōsec῾ank῾	խօսեցաք xōsec῾ak῾	խօսեցան xōsec῾an
to read Class III	կարդացի gartac῾i	կարդացիր gartac῾ir	կարդաց gartac῾	կարդացինք gartac῾ink῾	կարդացիք gartac῾ik῾	կարդացին gartac῾in

Examples of Indicative Usage
tense	Eastern	Western	gloss
present	Նա գիրքը կարդում է Na girk῾ë kardum ē	Ան կը կարդայ գիրքը An gë garta kirk῾ë	He is reading/reads the book
imperfect	Նրանք իմ գիրքը կարդում էին Nrank῾ im girk῾ë kardum ēin	Անոնք կը կարդային իմ գիրքը Anonk῾ gë gartayin im kirk῾ë	They were reading/used to read my book
future	Դու իր գիրքը կարդալու ես Du ir girk῾ë kardalu es	Դուն պիտի կարդաս իր գիրքը Tun bidi gartas ir kirk῾ë	You (sg) will read his book
preterite	Մենք մի գիրք կարդացինք Menk῾ mi girk῾ kardac῾ink῾	Մենք կարդացինք գիրք մը Menk῾ gartac῾ink῾ kirk῾ më	We read a book

==== Optative mood ====
The optative mood (called the subjunctive in some grammars) in Armenian is identical in both dialects. There are two tenses: non-past (present, etc...) and past (perfect, etc. ...).

===== Non-past =====
The non-past optative is the simple "present" conjugated form, as compared to other Indo-European languages:

Non-Past ("present") Optative
Eastern	Pronoun					
gloss	1sg. ես yes (I)	2sg. դու du (thou/you)	3sg. նա na (he/she/it)	1pl. մենք menk῾ (we)	2pl. դուք duk῾ (you (ye))	3pl. նրանք nrank῾ (they)
to love Class I	սիրեմ sirem	սիրես sires	սիրի siri	սիրենք sirenk῾	սիրեք sirek῾	սիրեն siren
to speak Class II	խոսեմ xosem	խոսես xoses	խոսի xosi	խոսենք xosenk῾	խոսեք xosek῾	խոսեն xosen
to read Class III	կարդամ kardam	կարդաս kardas	կարդա karda^{1}	կարդանք kardank῾	կարդաք kardak῾	կարդան kardan
Western	Pronoun					
gloss	1sg. ես yes (I)	2sg. դուն tun (thou/you)	3sg. ան an (he/she/it)	1pl. մենք menk῾ (we)	2pl. դուք tuk῾ (you (ye))	3pl. անոնք anonk῾ (they)
to love Class I	սիրեմ sirem	սիրես sires	սիրէ sirē	սիրենք sirenk῾	սիրէք sirēk῾	սիրեն siren
to speak Class II	խօսիմ xōsim	խօսիս xōsis	խօսի xōsi	խօսինք xōsink῾	խօսիք xōsik῾	խօսին xōsin
to read Class III	կարդամ gartam	կարդաս gartas	կարդայ garta^{1}	կարդանք gartank῾	կարդաք gartak῾	կարդան gartan

^{1}Historically, verbs of the third conjugation ended in final յ, which in traditional orthography is silent in word final position. Due to spelling reforms conducted in the earliest 20th century, final յ is missing from the Eastern conjugation

===== Past =====
The past optative is the simple "imperfect" conjugated form, as compared to other Indo-European languages:

Past Optative
Eastern	Pronoun					
gloss	1sg. ես yes (I)	2sg. դու du (thou/you)	3sg. նա na (he/she/it)	1pl. մենք menk῾ (we)	2pl. դուք duk῾ (you (ye))	3pl. նրանք nrank῾ (they)
to love Class I^{1}	սիրեի sirei	սիրեիր sireir	սիրեր sirer	սիրեինք sireink῾	սիրեիք sireik῾	սիրեին sirein
to speak Class II^{1}	խոսեի xosei	խոսեիր xoseir	խոսեր xoser	խոսեինք xoseink῾	խոսեիք xoseik῾	խոսեին xosein
to read Class III	կարդայի kardayi	կարդայիր kardayir	կարդար kardar	կարդայինք kardayink῾	կարդայիք kardayik῾	կարդային kardayin
Western	Pronoun					
gloss	1sg. ես yes (I)	2sg. դուն tun (thou/you)	3sg. ան an (he/she/it)	1pl. մենք menk῾ (we)	2pl. դուք tuk῾ (you (ye))	3pl. անոնք anonk῾ (they)
to love Class I^{1}	սիրէի sirēi	սիրէիր sirēir	սիրէր sirēr	սիրէինք sirēink῾	սիրէիք sirēik῾	սիրէին sirēin
to speak Class II^{1}	խօսէի xōsēi	խօսէիր xōsēir	խօսէր xōsēr	խօսէինք xōsēink῾	խօսէիք xōsēik῾	խօսէին xōsēin
to read Class III	կարդայի gartayi	կարդայիր gartayir	կարդար gartar	կարդայինք gartayink῾	կարդայիք gartayik῾	կարդային gartayin

^{1} In both dialects, the combinations եի and էի are pronounced as though spelt "եյի" and "էյի", meaning that սիրեի and սիրէի are both pronounced [siɹeji]. The latent yod յ is written and pronounced in class III verbs.

==== Conditional mood ====
Non-Past Conditional
Eastern	Pronoun					
gloss	1sg. ես yes (I)	2sg. դու du (thou/you)	3sg. նա na (he/she/it)	1pl. մենք menk῾ (we)	2pl. դուք duk῾ (you (ye))	3pl. նրանք nrank῾ (they)
to love Class I	կսիրեմ ksirem	կսիրես ksires	կսիրի ksiri	կսիրենք ksirenk῾	կսիրեք ksirek῾	կսիրեն ksiren
to speak Class II	կխոսեմ kxosem	կխոսես kxoses	կխոսի kxosi	կխոսենք kxosenk῾	կխոսեք kxosek῾	կխոսեն kxosen
to read Class III	կկարդամ kkardam	կկարդաս kkardas	կկարդա kkarda^{1}	կկարդանք kkardank῾	կկարդաք kkardak῾	կկարդան kkardan
Western	Pronoun					
gloss	1sg. ես yes (I)	2sg. դուն tun (thou/you)	3sg. ան an (he/she/it)	1pl. մենք menk῾ (we)	2pl. դուք tuk῾ (you (ye))	3pl. անոնք anonk῾ (they)
to love Class I	կը սիրեմ gë sirem	կը սիրես gë sires	կը սիրէ gë sirē	կը սիրենք gë sirenk῾	կը սիրէք gë sirek῾	կը սիրեն gë siren
to speak Class II	կը խօսիմ gë xōsim	կը խօսիս gë xōsis	կը խօսի gë xōsi	կը խօսինք gë xōsink῾	կը խօսիք gë xōsik῾	կը խօսին gë xōsin
to read Class III	կը կարդամ gë gartam	կը կարդաս gë gartas	կը կարդայ gë garta*	կը կարդանք gë gartank῾	կը կարդաք gë gartak῾	կը կարդան gë gartan

Past Conditional
Eastern	Pronoun					
gloss	1sg. ես yes (I)	2sg. դու du (thou/you)	3sg. նա na (he/she/it)	1pl. մենք menk῾ (we)	2pl. դուք duk῾ (you (ye))	3pl. նրանք nrank῾ (they)
to love Class I^{1}	կսիրեի ksirei	կսիրեիր ksireir	կսիրեր ksirer	կսիրեինք ksireink῾	կսիրեիք ksireik῾	կսիրեին ksirein
to speak Class II^{1}	կխոսեի kxosei	կխոսեիր kxoseir	կխոսեր kxoser	կխոսեինք kxoseink῾	կխոսեիք kxoseik῾	կխոսեին kxosein
to read Class III	կկարդայի kkardayi	կկարդայիր kkardayir	կկարդար kkardar	կկարդայինք kkardayink῾	կկարդայիք kkardayik῾	կկարդային kkardayin
Western	Pronoun					
gloss	1sg. ես yes (I)	2sg. դուն tun (thou/you)	3sg. ան an (he/she/it)	1pl. մենք menk῾ (we)	2pl. դուք tuk῾ (you (ye))	3pl. անոնք anonk῾ (they)
to love Class I	կը սիրէի պիտի սիրէի bidi sirēi	կը սիրէիր պիտի սիրէիր bidi sirēir	կը սիրէր պիտի սիրէր bidi sirēr	կը սիրէինք պիտի սիրէինք bidi sirēink῾	կը սիրէիք պիտի սիրէիք bidi sirēik῾	կը սիրէին պիտի սիրէին bidi sirēin
to speak Class II	կը խօսէի պիտի խօսէի bidi xōsēi	կը խօսէիր պիտի խօսէիր bidi xōsēir	կը խօսէր պիտի խօսէր bidi xōsēr	կը խօսէինք պիտի խօսէինք bidi xōsēink῾	կը խօսէիք պիտի խօսէիք bidi xōsēik῾	կը խօսէին պիտի խօսէին bidi xōsēin
to read Class III	կը կարդայի պիտի կարդայի bidi gartayi	կը կարդայիր պիտի կարդայիր bidi gartayir	կը կարդար պիտի կարդար bidi gartar	կը կարդայինք պիտի կարդայինք bidi gartayink῾	կը կարդայիք պիտի կարդայիք bidi gartayik῾	կը կարդային պիտի կարդային bidi gartayin

The conditional is mostly similar in both dialects.

In Eastern Armenian, the non-past conditional is formed by affixing կ- before the non-past optative. With this formation, Eastern Armenian also has a past conditional with k- plus past optative. Due to phonological restrictions, կ is pronounced [kë] before another consonant: կկարդա [këkaɹˈda] (He would read); կկարդային [këkaɹdaˈjin] (They would have read').

Western Armenian does the same, but it has another form identical to its Future in the Past (for the past conditional). The former has always been more prevalent, while the latter is falling in disuse.

The Eastern conditional forms, with slight orthographic variation, are identical to the Western present and imperfect indicative forms:

form	Eastern gloss	Western gloss
կը կարդայ (կկարդա)	he would read (if...) conditional	he reads pres. indic.
կը կարդային (կկարդային)	they would have read (if...) past conditional	they would read / they used to read imperf. indic.

The second (less prevalent) Western Armenian conditional is identical to the Eastern Past Necessitative.

==== Imperative mood ====
Eastern	Affirmative		Negative	
Eastern	Pronoun			
gloss	2sg. դու du (thou/you)	2pl. դուք duk῾ (you (ye))	2sg. դու du (thou/you)	2pl. դուք duk῾ (you (ye))
to love Class I	սիրի՛ր sirir! or սիրի՛ siri!^{1}	սիրեgե՛ք sirec῾ek῾! or սիրե՛ք sirek῾!^{1}	մի՛ սիրիր mi sirir! or մի՛ սիրի mi siri!^{1}	մի՛ սիրեք mi sirek῾!
to speak Class II	խոսի՛ր xosir! or խոսի՛ xosi!^{1}	խոսեgե՛ք xosec῾ek῾! or խոսե՛ք xosek῾!^{1}	մի՛ խոսիր mi xosir! or մի՛ խոսի mi xosi!^{1}	մի՛ խոսեք mi xosek῾!
to read Class III	կարդա՛ karda!	կարդաgե՛ք kardac῾ek῾!	մի՛ կարդա mi karda!	մի՛ կարդաք mi kardak῾!
Western	Affirmative		Negative	
Western	Pronoun			
gloss	2sg. դուն tun (thou/you)	2pl. դուք tuk῾ (you (ye))	2sg. դուն tun (thou/you)	2pl. դուք tuk῾ (you (ye))
to love Class I	սիրէ՛ sirē!	սիրեgէ՛ք sirec῾ēk῾!	մի՛ սիրեր mi sirē!	մի՛ սիրէք mi sirēk῾!
to speak Class II	խօսէ՛ xōsē!	խօսեgէ՛ք xōsec῾ēk῾!	մի՛ խօսիր mi xōsē!	մի՛ խօսիք mi xōsēk῾!
to read Class III	կարդա՛ garta!	կարդացէ՛ք gartac῾ēk῾!	մի՛ կարդար mi garta!	մի՛ կարդաք mi gartak῾!

^{1}Optional spoken forms

In both Eastern and Western Armenian, the imperative consists of the affirmative and the negative, and singular and plural forms (based on the second person you).

Eastern form	Western form	gloss
Խոսի՛ր; Xosir!	Խօսէ՛ Xōsē!	Speak (thou)!
Սիրեgե՛ք; Sirec῾ek῾!	Սիրեgէ՛ք; Sirec῾ēk῾!	Love (ye)!

==== Necessitative mood ====
Non-Past Necessitative
Eastern	Pronoun					
gloss	1sg. ես yes (I)	2sg. դու du (thou/you)	3sg. նա na (he/she/it)	1pl. մենք menk῾ (we)	2pl. դուք duk῾ (you (ye))	3pl. նրանք nrank῾ (they)
to love Class I	պիտի սիրեմ piti sirem	պիտի սիրես piti sires	պիտի սիրի piti siri	պիտի սիրենք piti sirenk῾	պիտի սիրեք piti sirek῾	պիտի սիրեն piti siren
to speak Class II	պիտի խոսեմ piti xosem	պիտի խոսես piti xoses	պիտի խոսի piti xosi	պիտի խոսենք piti xosenk῾	պիտի խոսեք piti xosek῾	պիտի խոսեն piti xosen
to read Class III	պիտի կարդամ piti kardam	պիտի կարդաս piti kardas	պիտի կարդա piti karda^{1}	պիտի կարդանք piti kardank῾	պիտի կարդաք piti kardak῾	պիտի կարդան piti kardan
Western	Pronoun					
gloss	1sg. ես yes (I)	2sg. դուն tun (thou/you)	3sg. ան an (he/she/it)	1pl. մենք menk῾ (we)	2pl. դուք tuk῾ (you (ye))	3pl. անոնք anonk῾ (they)
to love Class I	սիրելու եմ sirelu em	սիրելու ես sirelu es	սիրելու է sirelu ē	սիրելու ենք sirelu enk῾	սիրելու էք sirelu ēk῾	սիրելու են sirelu en
to speak Class II	խօսելու եմ xōsilu em	խօսելու ես xōsilu es	խօսելու է xōsilu ē	խօսելու ենք xōsilu enk῾	խօսելու էք xōsilu ēk῾	խօսելու են xōsilu en
to read Class III	կարդալու եմ gartalu em	կարդալու ես gartalu es	կարդալու է gartalu ē^{1}	կարդալու ենք gartalu enk῾	կարդալու էք gartalu ēk῾	կարդալու են gartalu en

Past Necessitative
Eastern	Pronoun					
gloss	1sg. ես yes (I)	2sg. դու du (thou/you)	3sg. նա na (he/she/it)	1pl. մենք menk῾ (we)	2pl. դուք duk῾ (you (ye))	3pl. նրանք nrank῾ (they)
to love Class I^{1}	պիտի սիրեի piti sirei	պիտի սիրեիր piti sireir	պիտի սիրեր piti sirer	պիտի սիրեինք piti sireink῾	պիտի սիրեիք piti sireik῾	պիտի սիրեին piti sirein
to speak Class II^{1}	պիտի խոսեի piti xosei	պիտի խոսեիր piti xoseir	պիտի խոսեր piti xoser	պիտի խոսեինք piti xoseink῾	պիտի խոսեիք piti xoseik῾	պիտի խոսեին piti xosein
to read Class III	պիտի կարդայի piti kardayi	պիտի կարդայիր piti kardayir	պիտի կարդար piti kardar	պիտի կարդայինք piti kardayink῾	պիտի կարդայիք piti kardayik῾	պիտի կարդային piti kardayin
Western	Pronoun					
gloss	1sg. ես yes (I)	2sg. դուն tun (thou/you)	3sg. ան an (he/she/it)	1pl. մենք menk῾ (we)	2pl. դուք tuk῾ (you (ye))	3pl. անոնք anonk῾ (they)
to love Class I^{1}	սիրելու էի sirelu ēi	սիրելու էիր sirelu ēir	սիրելու էր sirelu ēr	սիրելու էինք sirelu ēink῾	սիրելու էիք sirelu ēik῾	սիրելու էին sirelu ēin
to speak Class II^{1}	խօսելու էի xōsilu ēi	խօսելու էիր xōsilu ēir	խօսելու էր xōsilu ēr	խօսելու էինք xōsilu ēink῾	խօսելու էիք xōsilu ēik῾	խօսելու էին xōsilu ēin
to read Class III	կարդալու էի gartalu ēi	կարդալու էիր gartalu ēir	կարդալու էր gartalu ēr	կարդալու էինք gartalu ēink῾	կարդալու էիք gartalu ēik῾	կարդալու էին gartalu ēin

Both dialects have what is known as the necessitative mood (also found in Turkish). Both dialects have a past and a non-past necessitative. Eastern Armenian forms its necessitative by adding particle piti before the optative forms. Western Armenian forms its necessitative with the lu future participle plus the forms of әllal (to be)

Note that the EA particle piti is orthographically identical to the Western particle bidi, meaning that the Eastern necessitative forms are identical in form to the Western future indicative and conditional. Also note that the Western necessitative forms correspond to Eastern future indicative (and future perfect (see below)):

form	Eastern gloss	Western gloss
կարդալու է	he shall/will read fut. indicative	he should/must read non-past necessitative
պիտի սիրեմ	I should/must love non-past necessitative	I will/shall love fut. indicative

==== Voice ====
Armenian has two voices: Active and Passive.

All the forms above are Active. To make them passive, add the identifying letter վ in front of the ending.

Present Indicative
Eastern	Pronoun					
gloss	1sg. ես yes (I)	2sg. դու du (thou/you)	3sg. նա na (he/she/it)	1pl. մենք menk῾ (we)	2pl. դուք duk῾ (you (ye))	3pl. նրանք nrank῾ (they)
to be loved Class I	սիրվում եմ sirvum em	սիրվում ես sirvum es	սիրվում է sirvum ē	սիրվում ենք sirvum enk῾	սիրվում եք sirvum ek῾	սիրվում են sirvum en
to be spoken Class II	խոսվում եմ xosvum em	խոսվում ես xosvum es	խոսվում է xosvum ē	խոսվում ենք xosvum enk῾	խոսվում եք xosvum ek῾	խոսվում են xosvum en
to be read Class III	կարդացվում եմ kardacvum em	կարդացվում ես kardacvum es	կարդացվում է kardacvum ē	կարդացվում ենք kardacvum enk῾	կարդացվում եք kardacvum ek῾	կարդացվում են kardacvum en
Western	Pronoun					
gloss	1sg. ես yes (I)	2sg. դուն tun (thou/you)	3sg. ան an (he/she/it)	1pl. մենք menk῾ (we)	2pl. դուք tuk῾ (you (ye))	3pl. անոնք anonk῾ (they)
to be loved Class I	կը սիրուիմ gë sirvim	կը սիրուիս gë sirvis	կը սիրուի gë sirvi	կը սիրուինք gë sirvink῾	կը սիրուիք gë sirvik῾	կը սիրուին gë sirvin
to be spoken Class II	կը խօսուիմ gë xōsvim	կը խօսուիս gë xōsvis	կը խօսուի gë xōsvi	կը խօսուինք gë xōsvink῾	կը խօսուիք gë xōsvik῾	կը խօսուին gë xōsvin
to be read Class III	կը կարդացուիմ gë gartacvim	կը կարդացուիս gë gartacvis	կը կարդացուի gë gartacvi	կը կարդացուինք gë gartacvin῾	կը կարդացուիք gë gartacvi῾	կը կարդացուին gë gartacvin

===== Present and past perfect =====
Note: In Western Armenian, the present perfect and past perfect have two forms. One is formed by the past active participle and the verb to be (սիրեր եմ), while the other uses the more prevalent past (passive) participle (սիրած եմ). The first may denote the mediative (evidential or non evidential), the inferential, or the reportative. The second is more akin to the Eastern Perfect and the resultative.

Present Perfect
Eastern	Pronoun					
gloss	1sg. ես yes (I)	2sg. դու du (thou/you)	3sg. նա na (he/she/it)	1pl. մենք menk῾ (we)	2pl. դուք duk῾ (you (ye))	3pl. նրանք nrank῾ (they)
to love Class I	սիրել եմ sirel em	սիրել ես sirel es	սիրել է sirel ē	սիրել ենք sirel enk῾	սիրել եք sirel ek῾	սիրել են sirel en
to speak Class II	խոսել եմ xosel em	խոսել ես xosel es	խոսել է xosel ē	խոսել ենք xosel enk῾	խոսել եք xosel ek῾	խոսել են xosel en
to read Class III	կարդացել եմ kardac῾el em	կարդացել ես kardac῾el es	կարդացել է kardac῾el ē	կարդացել ենք kardac῾el enk῾	կարդացել եք kardac῾el ek῾	կարդացել են kardac῾el en
Western (Mediative)	Pronoun					
gloss	1sg. ես yes (I)	2sg. դուն tun (thou/you)	3sg. ան an (he/she/it)	1pl. մենք menk῾ (we)	2pl. դուք tuk῾ (you (ye))	3pl. անոնք anonk῾ (they)
to be loved Class I	սիրեր եմ sirer em	սիրեր ես sirer es	սիրեր է sirer ē	սիրեր ենք sirer enk῾	սիրեր էք sirer ēk῾	սիրեր են sirer en
to be spoken Class II	խօսեր եմ xōser em	խօսեր ես xōser es	խօսեր է xōser ē	խօսեր ենք xōser enk῾	խօսեր էք xōser ēk῾	խօսեր են xōser en
to be read Class III	կարդացեր եմ gartac῾er em	կարդացեր ես gartac῾er es	կարդացեր է gartac῾er ē	կարդացեր ենք gartac῾er enk῾	կարդացեր էք gartac῾er ēk῾	կարդացեր են gartac῾er en
Western (Resultative)	Pronoun					
gloss	1sg. ես yes (I)	2sg. դուն tun (thou/you)	3sg. ան an (he/she/it)	1pl. մենք menk῾ (we)	2pl. դուք tuk῾ (you (ye))	3pl. անոնք anonk῾ (they)
to be loved Class I	սիրած եմ siradz em	սիրած ես siradz es	սիրած է siradz ē	սիրած ենք siradz enk῾	սիրած էք siradz ēk῾	սիրած են siradz en
to be spoken Class II	խօսած եմ xōsadz em	խօսած ես xōsadz es	խօսած է xōsadz ē	խօսած ենք xōsadz enk῾	խօսած էք xōsadz ēk῾	խօսած են xōsadz en
to be read Class III	կարդացած եմ gartac῾adz em	կարդացած ես gartac῾adz es	կարդացած է gartac῾adz ē	կարդացած ենք gartac῾adz enk῾	կարդացած էք gartac῾adz ēk῾	կարդացած են gartac῾adz en

Past Perfect (Pluperfect)
Eastern	Pronoun					
gloss	1sg. ես yes (I)	2sg. դու du (thou/you)	3sg. նա na (he/she/it)	1pl. մենք menk῾ (we)	2pl. դուք duk῾ (you (ye))	3pl. նրանք nrank῾ (they)
to love Class I	սիրել էի sirel ēi	սիրել էիր sirel ēir	սիրել էր sirel ēr	սիրել էինք sirel ēink῾	սիրել էիք sirel ēik῾	սիրել էին sirel ēin
to speak Class II	խոսել էի xosel ēi	խոսել էիր xosel ēir	խոսել էր xosel ēr	խոսել էինք xosel ēink῾	խոսել էիք xosel ēik῾	խոսել էին xosel ēin
to read Class III	կարդացել էի kardac῾el ēi	կարդացել էիր kardac῾el ēir	կարդացել էր kardac῾el ēr	կարդացել էինք kardac῾el ēink῾	կարդացել էիք kardac῾el ēik῾	կարդացել էին kardac῾el ēin
Western (Mediative)	Pronoun					
gloss	1sg. ես yes (I)	2sg. դուն tun (thou/you)	3sg. ան an (he/she/it)	1pl. մենք menk῾ (we)	2pl. դուք tuk῾ (you (ye))	3pl. անոնք anonk῾ (they)
to be loved Class I	սիրեր էի sirer ēi	սիրեր էիր sirer ēir	սիրեր էր sirer ēr	սիրեր էինք sirer ēink῾	սիրեր էիք sirer ēik῾	սիրեր էին sirer ēin
to be spoken Class II	խօսեր էի xōser ēi	խօսեր էիր xōser ēir	խօսեր էր xōser ēr	խօսեր էինք xōser ēink῾	խօսեր էիք xōser ēik῾	խօսեր էին xōser ēin
to be read Class III	կարդացեր էի gartac῾er ēi	կարդացեր էիր gartac῾er ēir	կարդացեր էր gartac῾er ēr	կարդացեր էինք gartac῾er ēink῾	կարդացեր էիք gartac῾er ēik῾	կարդացեր էին gartac῾er ēin
Western (Resultative)	Pronoun					
gloss	1sg. ես yes (I)	2sg. դուն tun (thou/you)	3sg. ան an (he/she/it)	1pl. մենք menk῾ (we)	2pl. դուք tuk῾ (you (ye))	3pl. անոնք anonk῾ (they)
to be loved Class I	սիրած էի siradz ēi	սիրած էիր siradz ēir	սիրած էր siradz ēr	սիրած էինք siradz ēink῾	սիրած էիք siradz ēik῾	սիրած էին siradz ēin
to be spoken Class II	խօսած էի xōsadz ēi	խօսած էիր xōsadz ēir	խօսած էր xōsadz ēr	խօսած էինք xōsadz ēink῾	խօսած էիք xōsadz ēik῾	խօսած էին xōsadz ēin
to be read Class III	կարդացած էի gartac῾adz ēi	կարդացած էիր gartac῾adz ēir	կարդացած էր gartac῾adz ēr	կարդացած էինք gartac῾adz ēink῾	կարդացած էիք gartac῾adz ēik῾	կարդացած էին gartac῾adz ēin

The present perfect is formed with the l-past participle plus the present form of լինել (linel "to be"). The past perfect (pluperfect) is the l-past participle plus the imperfect of linel.

===== Future perfect (future in the past) =====
Future Perfect
Eastern	Pronoun					
gloss	1sg. ես yes (I)	2sg. դու du (thou/you)	3sg. նա na (he/she/it)	1pl. մենք menk῾ (we)	2pl. դուք duk῾ (you (ye))	3pl. նրանք nrank῾ (they)
to love Class I	սիրելու էի sirelu ēi	սիրելու էիր sirelu ēir	սիրելու էր sirelu ēr	սիրելու էինք sirelu ēink῾	սիրելու էիք sirelu ēik῾	սիրելու էին sirelu ēin
to speak Class II	խոսելու էի xoselu ēi	խոսելու էիր xoselu ēir	խոսելու էր xoselu ēr	խոսելու էինք xoselu ēink῾	խոսելու էիք xoselu ēik῾	խոսելու էին xoselu ēin
to read Class III	կարդալու էի kardalu ēi	կարդալու էիր kardalu ēir	կարդալու էր kardalu ēr	կարդալու էինք kardalu ēink῾	կարդալու էիք kardalu ēik῾	կարդալու էին kardalu ēin
Western	Pronoun					
gloss	1sg. ես yes (I)	2sg. դուն tun (thou/you)	3sg. ան an (he/she/it)	1pl. մենք menk῾ (we)	2pl. դուք tuk῾ (you (ye))	3pl. անոնք anonk῾ (they)
to love Class I	պիտի սիրէի bidi sirēi	պիտի սիրէիր bidi sirēir	պիտի սիրէր bidi sirēr	պիտի սիրէինք bidi sirēink῾	պիտի սիրէիք bidi sirēik῾	պիտի սիրէին bidi sirēin
to speak Class II	պիտի խօսէի bidi xōsēi	պիտի խօսէիր bidi xōsēir	պիտի խօսէր bidi xōsēr	պիտի խօսէինք bidi xōsēink῾	պիտի խօսէիք bidi xōsēik῾	պիտի խօսէին bidi xōsēin
to read Class III	պիտի կարդայի bidi gartayi	պիտի կարդայիր bidi gartayir	պիտի կարդար bidi gartar	պիտի կարդայինք bidi gartayink῾	պիտի կարդայիք bidi gartayik῾	պիտի կարդային bidi gartayin

The Eastern future perfect (future in the past) indicative is formed like the future indicative tense (using the lu-participle), substituting the present forms of the verb լինել linel with the imperfect.

In Western Armenian, it is identical to the imperfect, substituting կը with պիտի.

This tense is used with events which were most likely to happen, which were to happen, according to the speaker's firm conviction, but they either haven't happened, or it's not known.

A table of the perfect forms thus:

Form	Tense	Gloss
կարդաgել եմ	present anterior	I have read
կարդաgել էի	past anterior	I had read
կարդալու էի	future anterior	I was (about) to read /I was going to read /I would read

=== Putting it all together ===
A comparison of forms

Construction	Eastern gloss	Western gloss
present (simple)	optative: non-past (present)	optative: non-past (present)
imperfect (simple)	optative: past	optative: past
aorist	indicative: preterite	indicative: preterite
imperative	imperative	imperative
ge (կը) / k- (կ-) plus simple present	conditional: non-past (present)	indicative: present; conditional: present
ge (կը) / k- (կ-) plus simple imperfect	conditional: past	indicative: imperfect; conditional: past
bidi / piti (պիտի) plus simple present	necessitative: non-past (present)	indicative: future
bidi / piti (պիտի) plus simple imperfect	necessitative: past	indicative: future perfect; conditional
future participle -lu plus em reflex (-լու եմ)	indicative: future	necessitative: non-past (present)
future participle -lu plus ēi reflex (-լու էի)	indicative: future perfect	necessitative: past
past active participle plus em reflex (-լ եմ)/(-եր եմ)	indicative: present perfect	indicative: non-past perfect
past active participle plus ēi reflex (-լ էի)/(-եր էի)	indicative: past perfect	indicative: past perfect
present participle -um plus em reflex (-ում եմ)	indicative: present	--
present participle -um plus ēi reflex (-ում էի)	indicative: imperfect	--

There are two tables, showing the full conjugation of each dialect's verb paradigms, Eastern and Western.
