= Karo (name) =

Karo is an Armenian given name, a shortened version of the Armenian given name Karapet (Eastern Armenian) / Garabed (Western Armenian). The Western Armenian variant of Karo is Garo.

== Given name ==
- Karo Ghafadaryan (1907–1976), Soviet Armenian archaeologist, historian, and epigraphist
- Karo Haghverdian (born 1945), Iranian-Armenian football player
- Karo Halabyan (1897–1959), Soviet Armenian architect
- Karo Lumis (born 1980), Papua New Guinean cricketer
- Karo Mkrtchyan (1951–2001), Armenian painter
- Karo Murat (born 1983), Armenian-German professional boxer
- Karo Parisyan (born 1982), Armenian-American mixed martial arts fighter

== Surname ==
- Aaron Karo (born 1979), American author and comedian
- Andreas Karo (born 1996), Cypriot footballer
- Armen Karo (or Garo) (1872–1923), Armenian nationalist politician
- Ezekiel Karo (1844–1915), German rabbi and historian
- Georg Karo (1872–1963), German archaeologist
- Henry Arnold Karo (1903–1986), vice admiral in the United States Coast and Geodetic Survey
- Isaac Karo (1458–1535), Spanish rabbi
- Joseph Karo (1488–1575), also known as Yosef Karo or Caro, Spanish-born rabbi and author of the Shulchan Aruch
- Paul Karo (1935–2025), Australian actor
- Silvo Karo (born 1960), Slovenian mountain climber

== See also ==
- Karo (disambiguation)
- Garo (name)
- Karlo (name)
- Karol (name)
