= Inchoative verb =

Verb showing a process of beginning or becoming

An inchoative verb, sometimes called an "inceptive" verb, shows a process of beginning or becoming. Productive inchoative affixes exist in several languages, including the suffixes present in Latin and Ancient Greek, and consequently some Romance languages. Not all verbs with inchoative suffixes have retained their inceptive meaning. In Italian, for example, present indicative finisco 'I finish' contains the form of the suffix, while present indicative finiamo 'we finish' does not, yet the only difference in meaning is that of person subject; the suffix is now semantically inert.

== Latin and Romance Languages ==
Latin uses the infix -sc- to show inchoative force. The suffix is normally seen in the present tense stem, and is not present in the third and fourth principal parts.

- apiscor, apiscī, aptus sum reach
- crescō, crescere, crēvī, crētus come into being, grow up
- convalescō, convalescere, convaluī recover, grow strong
- discō, discere, didicī learn
- īrascor, īrascī, īrātus sum be in a rage
- lapidescō, lapidescere become stone
- nanciscor, nanciscī, nactus/nanctus sum to meet with, stumble upon
- nascor, nasci, natus sum to be begotten, to be generated, to be born, as nascent life
- noscō, noscere, nōvī, nōtus get to know
- obdormiscō, obdormiscere, obdormīvī, obdormītus sum fall asleep
- poscō, poscere, poposcī demand
- proficiscor, proficiscī, profectus sum set out
- rubescō, rubescere, rubuī to grow red, redden

=== Romance Languages ===
In Romance languages, the Latin inchoative suffixes became incorporated into the inflections of fourth conjugation verbs (-īre). Catalan, Occitan, Italian, and Romanian have distinctions between "infixed" (infixed with the inchoative suffix -ēscō) and "pure" (non-infixed) verbs, with the number of pure verbs tend to be fewer than the infixed ones, while French has pure verbs but treated as irregular.

==== Catalan ====
In Catalan, the 3rd verb category (verbs ending in ‘-ir’) is divided into 2 sub-categories: ‘pure’ and ‘inchoative’. The vast majority of 3rd category verbs are inchoative and are marked by the addition of the affix ‘-esc-, -eix-‘, with less than only 15 to 20 of all 3rd category verbs falling into the ‘pure’ sub-category.

Inchoative verbs are affected in only their first, second, third and third person plural conjugations. This can be seen below in the table below comparing the present indicative conjugations of the pure verb ‘dormir’ (to sleep) with the inchoative verb ‘servir’ (to serve):

Person	Dormir (pure)	Servir (inchoative)
1st	dorm	serveixo, servesc, serveixi, servisc, servisc
2nd	dorms	serveixes, servixes
3rd	dorm	serveix, servix
1st pl.	dormim	servim
2nd pl.	dormiu	serviu
3rd pl.	dormen	serveixen, servixen

As nearly all of the 3rd category verbs are inchoative, there is very little, if any, relationship between the inchoative verbs of Catalan and the traditional inceptive meaning and function of inchoative verbs. It is most likely that this verb sub-category is named ‘inchoative’ because the associated morpheme ‘-eix-‘ stems directly from the Latin inchoative morpheme ‘-sc-‘, despite its function and usage having disappeared.

== Ancient Greek ==
Greek also uses the inchoative suffix -σκ- (-sk-), although it does not always indicate inchoative meaning. Suffix -σκ- (-sk-) is added to verb-stems ending in vowels, -ισκ- (-isk-) to consonant stems.

- ἀρέσκω (aré-sk-ō) "I please" or "appease" (first aorist ἤρεσα (ḗre-s-a) "I appeased")
- φάσκω (phá-sk-ō) "I say" (from φημί (phē-mí), same meaning)
- εὑρίσκω (heur-ísk-ō) "I find" (second aorist ηὗρον (hēûr-on) "I found")

Past iterative verb forms in Homer and Herodotus use the same suffix.

== Finnish ==
Finnish inchoatives may be marked with -nt- (which undergoes consonant gradation to -nn- in weak form).

- vaalentua "to go paler" < vaalea "pale"
- hiljentyä "to go silent" < hiljainen "silent"

An alternative form is vaaleta, hiljetä, etc.

Not all inchoatives are marked like this, however, e.g. kuolla "to die".

The translative case marks "becoming something" on the noun, thus a target state is marked with the translative case (-ksi): lehti vaalenee keltaiseksi "the leaf fades to yellow". The transformation from a state is marked with the elative case (-sta): lehti vaalenee tummanvihreästä keltaiseksi "the leaf fades from dark green to yellow". In eastern Karelian dialects, the exessive case (-nta) specifically refers to inchoative changes.

== Armenian ==
Armenian has a class of inchoative verbs marked with the infix -ան- (-an-) or -ն- (-n-). They belong to the third conjugation, so the full infinitive ending is -անալ or -նալ.

- հիւանդանալ "to become ill" < հիւանդ "sick, ill"
- նիհարանալ "to get thin" < նիհար "thin, slender"
- կարմրանալ "to redden, to blush" < կարմիր "red"
- աղքատանալ "to be impoverished" < աղքատ "poor"
- ամչնալ "to be shamed, become ashamed" < ամօթ "shame"

In Western Armenian, the penultimate vowel tends to weaken or drop out, so the -անալ suffix is more commonly -նալ, sometimes pronounced -ընալ (հիւանդնալ, նիհարնալ, կարմրընալ).

Inchoatives are considered part of the third conjugation, but they form a special category because the infix drops in the past tense; while regular third conjugation verbs add ց to the present stem, for the inchoatives the ց appears in the place of the dropped ն.

- կարդալ "to read" > կարդացաւ "he read" (past of regular third conjugation)
- սպիտականալ "to become white" > սպիտակացաւ not *սպիտականացաւ "it became white"

The infix generally retains its inchoative meaning in modern usage, although sometimes the verbs are translated to other languages as simple verbs because the inchoative meaning requires a compound that may be awkward or unnatural in a language that lacks this aspect. (գողանալ - to steal, lit. become thief). This convention does not extend as broadly to the past tenses, where the aorist past has to be translated as an inceptive verb in order to distinguish it from imperfect tenses (e.g., հիւանդանում է may be translated as "he is sick" rather than "he becomes sick," but for հիւանդացաւ, "he became sick" is more precise than "he was sick," which can also be հիւանդ էր, հիւանդանում էր, հիւանդացել է, etc.)

It remains a very productive grammatical feature, and almost any adjective and some nouns can be made inchoative verbs simply by the addition of the suffix -անալ / -նալ.

- արագ "quick, fast" > արագանալ "to speed up, become fast"
- բարկ "furious" > բարկանալ "to get angry"
- կոյր "blind" > կուրանալ, կոյրնալ "to become blind"
- անօթի "hungry" > անօթենալ "to become hungry"
- տաք "hot" > տաքանալ, տաքնալ "to get hot"
- արթուն "awake" > արթնանալ, արթննալ "to wake up, become alert"
- քար "rock" > քարանալ "to harden, petrify"
- ծանօթ "friend, acquaintance" > ծանօթանալ "to meet, get to know"

There are verbs that have a similar form to the inchoative verbs but are different. The similarity may be derived from the similar sounding but grammatically different verbal ending -ենալ, especially in Western Armenian dialects, where dropping the weak penultimate vowel merges -ենալ and -անալ into -նալ. In other cases, the ն derives from an irregular root that belongs to the third conjugation or was subsumed into the third conjugation because of phonetic similarity. The latter category can be recognized by the irregular past tense forms that drop the ն.

- մօտնալ < մօտենալ "to approach, get close to"
- ճանչնալ < ճանաչել "to meet, acquaint"
- դառնալ "to turn, to become" > դարձայ "I turned"
- բանալ "to open" (transitive) > բացի "I opened"
- իյնալ "to fall" > ինկայ "I fell" (Eastern Armenian uses derivation ընկանել)
- տեսնալ "to see" > տեսայ "I saw" (standard տեսնել < տեսանել)

== Germanic languages ==
The Germanic languages historically formed inchoative verbs with the suffix -n-. Verbs derived with this suffix belonged to the distinct fourth class of weak verbs in Gothic, while in most other Germanic languages they belonged to the second weak class.

The suffix survives in English as -en, and is still somewhat productive although there are other suffixes such as -ify which compete with it. However, verbs with this suffix are now primarily ergatives, and also have a causative sense ("to cause to become") when used transitively. Some examples:

- dark > darken
- white > whiten
- hard > harden
- thick > thicken

Swedish also retains use of the suffix, which is still somewhat productive. Some examples:

- blek "pale" > blekna "to go pale"
- tyst "quiet" > tystna "to fall silent"
- fast "firm, fastened" > fastna "to get stuck"
- hård "hard" > hårdna "to be hardened"
- kall "cold" > kallna "to become cold"
- rutten "rotten" > ruttna "to rot"

Similarly, in the Danish language with, e.g., blegne (to go pale) and gråne (become grey).

== See also ==
- Inchoative aspect
- Translative case
