= Armenian Cemetery =

Armenian Cemetery may refer to:

- Ararat Massis Armenian Cemetery, in Fresno, California, US
- Armenian Cemetery, Rostov-on-Don, officially known as the Proletarian Cemetery, in Rostov-on-Don, Russia
- Armenian cemetery in Hyderabad, also known as Uppuguda Armenian cemetery, a 300-year-old cemetery in Hyderabad, India
- Armenian cemetery in Julfa, a former cemetery in Julfa, Azerbaijan
- Moscow Armenian Cemetery, a cemetery in Moscow, Russia
- New Julfa Armenian Cemetery, in Isfahan, Iran
- Pangaltı Armenian Cemetery, a former cemeteryin Istanbul, Turkey
- Şişli Armenian Cemetery, in the Şişli district of Istanbul, Turkey
- Smolensky Armenian Cemetery, a cemetery in St Petersburg, Russia

== See also ==
- Category:Armenian cemeteries
