= Garo =

Garo may refer to:

== People and languages ==
- Garo people, a tribal people in India
  - Garo language, the language spoken by the Garo tribe

== Places ==
- Kingdom of Garo, a former kingdom in southern Ethiopia
- Garo, Colorado
- Garo Hills, part of the Garo-Khasi range in Meghalaya, India

== Persons ==
- Garo (name), an Armenian given name
- Emma Garo, a judge from the Solomon Islands
- Isabelle Garo, a French philosopher
- Garo, a character from the manga series One-Punch Man

== Film and television ==
=== Japanese ===
- Garo (franchise), a Japanese tokusatsu TV franchise
- Garo (TV series), sometimes referred to as Golden Knight Garo, a Japanese tokusatsu television series
- Garo: Yami o Terasu Mono, a Japanese tokusatsu television series, premiering April 2013
- Garo: Makai no Hana, Japanese tokusatsu television drama. Fourth television series in the Garo metaseries, premiering April 2014
- Garo: Gold Storm Sho, both a film and the fifth television series in the Garo metaseries
- Garo: Kami no Kiba, 2017 dark fantasy tokusatsu theatrical film, the eighth feature film in the Garo franchise. It first screened on October 31, 2017
- Garo: The Animation, Japanese anime series based on the Garo tokusatsu drama. It includes:
  - Garo: The Carved Seal of Flames, premiering October 2014
  - Garo: Crimson Moon, premiering October 2015
  - Garo: Divine Flame, premiering May 2016
  - Garo: Vanishing Line, premiering October 2017
- Garo: Red Requiem, 2010 Japanese 3-D film
- Garo: Soukoku no Maryu, 2013 Japanese film
- Garo Gaiden: Tougen no Fue, 2013 Japanese film based on the Garo TV series
- Garo: Makai Retsuden, an omnibus television series that features the cast of several live-action series produced over the years in the Garo metaseries, celebrating its 10th anniversary

== Music ==
- Garo Project, a Japanese musical ensemble made up of the cast of the Garo television series
- Garo (band), a Japanese rock group

== Other ==
- Garo (magazine), a Japanese monthly alternative manga anthology magazine
- Garo Baptist Convention, a Protestant denomination of the ethnic group in India, mostly in Meghalaya
- Garo National Council, a political party in Meghalaya in north-eastern India
- Garo (fish), a genus of fish from the family Chaudhuriidae

== See also ==
- Karo (1937 film), sometimes pronounced Garo, an adventure-war film directed by Artashes Hay-Artyan and S. Taits
- Garos, a commune in the Pyrénées-Atlantiques department in south-western France
- Garou (disambiguation)
