= Karo =

Karo may refer to:

== Ethnic groups ==
- Karo people (East Africa)
- Karo people (Indonesia), the indigenous people of the Karo Plateau in North Sumatra

== Films ==
- Karo (1937 film), an Armenian-language Soviet adventure-war film
- Karo (2019 film), an Iranian film
- My Queen Karo, a 2009 Belgian film whose protagonist is named Karo

== Languages ==
- Karo language (Brazil), a Tupian language
- Karo language (Ethiopia), an Omotic language
- Karo language (Nilotic), a Nilotic language of Uganda, South Sudan and the DRC
- Batak Karo language, an Austronesian language of Sumatra, Indonesia
- The Kalo dialect of the Austronesian Keapara language of Papua New Guinea
- The Karo dialect of the Papuan Rawa language of Papua New Guinea

== People ==
- Karo (name), a list of people with the given name or surname

== Other uses ==
- Karo Regency, a regency of North Sumatra, Indonesia
- KARO (98.7 FM) a radio station of Oregon, the United States
- Karō, samurai officials and advisers of feudal Japan
- Karo-kari, term for honor killing in Pakistan
- Karo syrup, an American brand of corn syrup
- Karo (tree), small tree or shrub native to New Zealand, aka Pittosporum crassifolium
- United States v. Karo, 468 U.S. 705 (1984), a Supreme Court decision related to the Fourth Amendment's protections against unreasonable search and seizure
- Karo (cigarette), a German brand of filterless cigarettes
- Eucalyptus brassiana, known as the Karo tree in Papua New Guinea

== See also ==
- Caro (disambiguation)
- Garo (disambiguation)
- Karos (disambiguation)
