= Karapet =

Karapet or Garabet or Garabed is a common Armenian given name. They may refer to:

- a pre-Christian Armenian thunder-god, Karapet

== Religion ==
- Karabet (Armenian: Կարապետ) or Garabed (Western Armenian), the Armenian name for prodromos, referring to John the Baptist
- St. Karapet, a church of the Noravank monastery
- Saint Karapet Monastery, at Glak, a 4th-century Armenian monastery
- Saint Karapet Monastery of Aprakunis, Armenian monastery in Nakhchivan
- Karapet, a church of the Khtzkonk monastery near Ani
- Saint Karapet Church, Tbilisi, Armenian church in Tbilisi, Georgia
- St. Karapet's Church, Rostov-on-Don

== Given name ==
=== Karapet ===
- Karapet II of Armenia (died 1729), Catholicos of the Armenian Apostolic Church (1726–1729)
- Karapet Agadzhanian (1876–1955), Russian-Armenian psychiatrist, neurologist and neuroanatomist
- Karapet Chalyan (born 1993), Armenian wrestler
- Karapet Chobanyan (born 1927), Armenian scientist
- Karapet Karapetyan (born 1982), also known as Karapet Papijan, Armenian-Dutch kickboxer
- Karapet Mikaelyan (born 1969), Russia-born Armenian football (soccer) player
- Karapet Rubinyan (born 1957), Armenian politician
- Karapet Utudjian (1823–1904), Armenian Ottoman journalist, publicist, and writer
- Karapetê Xaço (died 2005), Armenian singer of traditional Kurdish dengbêj music
- Karapet Yeghiazaryan (1932–2006), Armenian painter
- Karapet (bridge player), fictional Armenian expatriate contract bridge player created by Victor Mollo (1909–1987)

=== Garabed ===
- Garabed "Chuck" Haytaian (born 1938), American politician of Armenian origin, who was the Speaker of the New Jersey State Assembly
- Garabed T. K. Giragossian (20th century), Armenian engineer
- Garabed Krikorian, 19th-century Armenian photographer
- Garabed Pashayan Khan (1864–1915), Armenian physician, doctor and public activist
- Garo Yepremian (Garabed "Garo" Yepremian) (1944–2015), American football placekicker of Armenian origin

=== Garabet ===
- Garabet Amira Balyan (1800–1866), Armenian Ottoman, renowned engineer
- Garabet Artin Davoudian (1816–1873), Armenian Ottoman diplomat and governor
- Garabet Avedissian (born 1959), Uruguayan football manager
- Garabet Ibrăileanu (1871–1936), Romanian-Armenian literary critic and theorist, writer, editor, translator, sociologist, professor
- Garabet Tavitjan (born 1953), Macedonian drummer of Armenian descent
- Garabet Yazmaciyan (1868–1929), Ottoman painter of Armenian descent

== Middle name ==
- Charles Garabed Atamian (1872–1947), French painter of Armenian descent
- Levon Garabed Baljian (1908–1994), Armenian Supreme Patriarch
- Nshan Ara Garabed Topouzian (1966–2010), Armenian Apostolic clergyman
- Sarkis Garabet Soghanalian (1929–2011), Armenian arms dealer

== Surname ==
- Arin Karapet (born 1988), Swedish politician
- Balabekh Karapet (died 1915), Armenian fedayi in the Ottoman Empire

== See also ==
- Karapetyan/Garabedian
- Karo (name)
- Garo (name)
