= Necessitative mood =

Grammatical mood found in Turkish and Armenian

The necessitative mood (abbreviated NEC) is a grammatical mood found in Turkish and Armenian, which combines elements of both the cohortative (which is typically used in only the first person) and the jussive moods (which is typically only used in the first and third persons). It expresses plea, insistence, imploring, self-encouragement, wish, desire, intent, command, purpose or consequence.

Turkish has a past (both definite and inferential), and non-past necessitative. It is also possible to combine the necessitative with the modal verb "can" in all three tenses. Examples of the necessitative in Turkish:

bakmalıyım (I should look); bakmamalısınız (you (pl). should not look); gitmeliyiz (we have/need to go)
bakmalıydım (I should have looked); bakmamalıydınız (you (pl). should have not looked); gitmeliydik (we should have gone)
bakmalıymışım (apparently I should have looked); bakmamalıymışsınız (you (pl). should have not looked, apparently); gitmeliymişiz (we should have apparently gone)
bakabilmeliyiz (we should be able to look)
bakabilmeliydik (we should have been able to look)
bakabilmeliymişiz (apparently we should have been able to look)

Both Eastern and Western Armenian have a past and a non-past necessitative. Eastern Armenian forms its necessitative by adding the particle պիտի piti before the optative forms, while Western Armenian forms its necessitative with the lu future participle plus the forms of ըլլալ әllal (to be).

The Eastern particle piti is orthographically identical to the Western particle bidi, which is used to form the future indicative and conditional. In turn, the Western necessitative forms correspond to Eastern future indicative and future perfect.
