= Karos =

Karos may refer to:

- Karos, Hungary, village in Borsod-Abaúj-Zemplén county
- Zdzisław Karos (died 1982), Polish police officer

== See also ==
- Karros, surname
- Karo (disambiguation)
- Caros, given name
