= Caro =

Caro may refer to:

== Places ==
- Caro, Michigan, United States
- Caro, Morbihan, France
- Çaro, Pyrénées-Atlantiques, France

== Other uses ==
- Caro (given name), including a list of people with the given name
- Caro (surname), including a list of people with the surname
- Caro (drink), a drink by Nestlé
- Caro (horse) (1967–1989), a French Thoroughbred racehorse
- "Caro" (Bad Bunny song), 2018
- "Caro" (L.A.X and Wizkid song), 2013
- CARO, Computer Antivirus Research Organization
- Caro Ru Lushe, a fictional character in Magical Girl Lyrical Nanoha StrikerS
- Caro, a Vietnamese variant of the game Gomoku
- Polonez Caro or FSO Polonez, a Polish automobile

== See also ==
- Frank–Caro process, used to produce cyanamide from calcium carbide and nitrogen gas in an electric furnace
- Linde–Frank–Caro process, another process used to produce hydrogen from water gas
- Peroxymonosulfuric acid, also known as Caro's acid
- Caro-Kann defense, a chess opening that includes the moves 1.e4 c6
- Karo (disambiguation)
