= Garou =

Garou may refer to:

- Garou (singer), Québécois singer
  - Garou (album), a 2006 album by Garou
- Garou (World of Darkness), a fictional race of werewolves in White Wolf's World of Darkness role-playing game
- Garou, Benin, a town and arrondissement of Benin
- Garou: Mark of the Wolves, a game in the Fatal Fury series for the Neo-Geo hardware
- Garou, a character from the manga and anime series One-Punch Man

== See also ==
- Garo (disambiguation)
- Garou Densetsu or Legend of the Hungry Wolf, Fatal Fury fighting games, created by SNK for the Neo-Geo system
- Loup-garou or werewolf
