= Armenians in North Macedonia =

Ethnic group

Total population
- 300

Regions with significant populations

Languages
- Armenian, Macedonian, Russian

Religion
- Armenian Apostolic

Related ethnic groups
- Armenian diaspora

Armenians in North Macedonia (Macedonian: Ерменци во Македонија, romanized: Ermenci vo Makedonija, Armenian: Հայերը Հյուսիսային Մակեդոնիայում, romanized: Hayery Hyusisayin Makedoniayum) are the ethnic Armenians in North Macedonia. The number of Armenians is about 300 people.

== People ==
- Garabet Tavitjan, musician, member of Leb i Sol
- Diran Tavitjan, musician
- Garo Tavitjan, Jr., musician
- Kosta Balabanov, scientist and honorary consul of Japan in Macedonia
- Artur Surmejan, Macedonian tenor
- Hazaros Surmejan, ballet dancer and choreographer
- Tigran Kandikjan, football player
- Vladimir Kandikjan, university professor
- Tatjana Kandikjan, university professor
- Vortik Stefan Knalijan, Master of Geographic Sciences and merchant. Owner of trading company since 1990 in manufacturing, agriculture, trade and services

== See also ==
- Armenians in Greece
- Armenians in Serbia
- Armenians in Bulgaria
