= Western Armenian verb table =

The following is a Western Armenian verb table. The Eastern Armenian verb table can be found here:

== Conjugations ==
=== Affirmative/Interrogative ===
==== Type I ====
Indicative

Present

Imperfect
Preterite
Future
1sg

2sg
3sg
1pl
2pl
3pl

yes

tun
an
menk'
tuk'
anonk'

gë sirem

gë sires
gë sirê
gë sirenk'
gë sirêk'
gë siren

gë sirêi

gë sirêir
gë sirêr
gë sirêink'
gë sirêik'
gë sirêin

sirets'i

sirets'ir
sirets'
sirets'ink'
sirets'ik'
sirets'in

bidi sirem

bidi sires
bidi sirê
bidi sirenk'
bidi sirêk'
bidi siren

Perfect
Pluperfect
1sg

2sg
3sg
1pl
2pl
3pl

siradz em

siradz es
siradz ê
siradz enk'
siradz êk'
siradz en

siradz êi

siradz êir
siradz êr
siradz êink'
siradz êik'
siradz êin

Optative

Non-Past

Past
Conditional

Non-Past

1sg

2sg
3sg
1pl
2pl
3pl

sirem

sires
sirê
sirenk'
sirêk'
siren

sirêi

sirêir
sirêr
sirêink'
sirêik'
sirêin

bidi sirêi

bidi sirêir
bidi sirêr
bidi sirêink'
bidi sirêik'
bidi sirêin

Jussive

Non-Past

Past
Imperative

1sg

2sg
3sg
1pl
2pl
3pl

sirelu yem

sirelu yes
sirelu ê
sirelu yenk'
sirelu êk'
sirelu yen

sirelu êi

sirelu êir
sirelu êr
sirelu êink'
sirelu êik'
sirelu êin

sirê!

sirenk'!
sirets'êk'!

Infinitive

Gerund
Past Act. Participle
Past Pass. Participle
Future Participle I
Future Participle II

sirel (to love)

sirogh
sirer
siradz
sirelu
sirelik'

==== Type II ====
Indicative

Present

Imperfect
Preterite
Future
1sg

2sg
3sg
1pl
2pl
3pl

yes

tun
an
menk'
tuk'
anonk'

gë khosim

gë khôsis
gë khôsi
gë khôsink'
gë khôsik'
gë khôsin

gë khôsêi

gë khôsêir
gë khôsêr
gë khôsêink'
gë khôsêik'
gë khôsêin

*khôsets'ay

khôsets'ar
*khôsets'au
khôsets'ank'
khôsets'ak'
khôsets'an

bidi khôsim

bidi khôsis
bidi khôsi
bidi khôsink'
bidi khôsik'
bidi khôsin

Perfect
Pluperfect
1sg

2sg
3sg
1pl
2pl
3pl

khôsadz em

khôsadz es
khôsadz ê
khôsadz enk'
khôsadz ek'
khôsadz en

khôsadz êi

khôsadz êir
khôsadz êr
khôsadz êink'
khôsadz êik'
khôsadz êin

Optative

Non-Past

Past
Conditional

Non-Past

1sg

2sg
3sg
1pl
2pl
3pl

khôsim

khôsis
khôsi
khôsink'
khôsik'
khôsin

khôsêi

khôsêir
khôsêr
khôsêink'
khôsêik'
khôsêin

bidi khôsêi

bidi khôsêir
bidi khôsêr
bidi khôsêink'
bidi khôsêik'
bidi khôsêin

Jussive

Non-Past

Past
Imperative

1sg

2sg
3sg
1pl
2pl
3pl

khôsilu yem

khôsilu yes
khôsilu ê
khôsilu yenk'
khôsilu êk'
khôsilu yen

khôsilu êi

khôsilu êir
khôsilu êr
khôsilu êink'
khôsilu êik'
khôsilu êin

khôsê!

khôsink'!
khôsêts'êk'!

Infinitive

Gerund
Past Act. Participle
Past Pass. Participle
Future Participle I
Future Participle II

khôsil (to speak)

khôsogh
khôser
khôsadz
khôsilu
khôsilik'

Note: the forms khôsets'ay and khôsets'au are pronounced /khôsets'a/ and /khôsets'av/, respectively.

==== Type III ====
Indicative

Present

Imperfect
Preterite
Future
1sg

2sg
3sg
1pl
2pl
3pl

yes

tun
an
menk'
tuk'
anonk'

gë gartam

gë gartas
*gë gartay
gë gartank'
gë gartak'
gë gartan

gë gartayi

gë gartayir
gë gartar
gë gartayink'
gë gartayik'
gë gartayin

gartats'i

gartats'ir
gartats'
gartats'ink'
gartats'ik'
gartats'in

bidi gartam

bidi gartas
bidi gartay
bidi gartank'
bidi gartak'
bidi gartan

Perfect
Pluperfect
1sg

2sg
3sg
1pl
2pl
3pl

gartats'adz em

gartats'adz es
gartats'adz ê
gartats'adz enk'
gartats'adz ek'
gartats'adz en

gartats'adz êi

gartats'adz êir
gartats'adz êr
gartats'adz êink'
gartats'adz êik'
gartats'adz êin

Optative

Non-Past

Past
Conditional

Non-Past

1sg

2sg
3sg
1pl
2pl
3pl

gartam

gartas
*gartay
gartank'
gartak'
gartan

gartayi

gartayir
gartar
gartayink'
gartayik'
gartayin

bidi gartayi

bidi gartayir
bidi gartar
bidi gartayink'
bidi gartayik'
bidi gartayin

Jussive

Non-Past

Past
Imperative

1sg

2sg
3sg
1pl
2pl
3pl

gartalu yem

gartalu yes
gartalu ê
gartalu yenk'
gartalu êk'
gartalu yen

gartalu êi

gartalu êir
gartalu êr
gartalu êink'
gartalu êik'
gartalu êin

garta!

gartank'!
gartats'êk'!

Infinitive

Gerund
Past Act. Participle
Past Pass. Participle
Future Participle I
Future Participle II

gartal (to read)

gartats'ogh
gartats'er
gartats'adz
gartalu
gartalik'

Note: the form gartay is pronounced /garta/.

=== Negative ===
Note: the formation of the negative is the same for all conjugations. The examples below are based on the first conjugation.

Indicative

Present

Imperfect
Preterite
Future
1sg

2sg
3sg
1pl
2pl
3pl

yes

tun
an
menk'
tuk'
anonk'

ch'em sirer

ch'es sirer
ch'ê sirer
ch'enk' sirer
ch'êk' sirer
ch'en sirer

ch'êi sirer

ch'êir sirer
ch'êr sirer
ch'êink' sirer
ch'êik' sirer
ch'êin sirer

ch'sirec'i

ch'sirec'ir
ch'sirec'
ch'sirec'ink'
ch'sirec'ik'
ch'sirec'in

bidi ch'sirem

bidi ch'sires
bidi ch'sirê
bidi ch'sirenk'
bidi ch'sirêk'
bidi ch'siren

Perfect
Pluperfect
1sg

2sg
3sg
1pl
2pl
3pl

ch'em siradz

ch'es siradz
ch'ê siradz
ch'enk' siradz
ch'êk' siradz
ch'en siradz

ch'êi siradz

ch'êir siradz
ch'êr siradz
ch'êink' siradz
ch'êik' siradz
ch'êin siradz

Optative

Non-Past

Past
Conditional

Non-Past

1sg

2sg
3sg
1pl
2pl
3pl

ch'sirem

ch'sires
ch'sirê
ch'sirenk'
ch'sirêk'
ch'siren

ch'sirêi

ch'sirêir
ch'sirêr
ch'sirêink'
ch'sirêik'
ch'sirêin

bidi ch'sirêi

bidi ch'sirêir
bidi ch'sirêr
bidi ch'sirêink'
bidi ch'sirêik'
bidi ch'sirêin

Jussive

Non-Past

Past
Imperative

1sg

2sg
3sg
1pl
2pl
3pl

ch'em sirelu

ch'es sirelu
ch'ê sirelu
ch'enk' sirelu
ch'êk' sirelu
ch'en sirelu

ch'êi sirelu

ch'êir sirelu
ch'êr sirelu
ch'êink' sirelu
ch'êik' sirelu
ch'êin sirelu

mi sirer!

mi sirêk'!

Infinitive

Gerund
Past Act. Participle
Past Pass. Participle
Future Participle I
Future Participle II

ch'sirel (to not love)

ch'sirogh
ch'sirer
ch'siradz
ch'sirelu
ch'sirelik'
