= Eastern Armenian verb table =

The following is an Eastern Armenian verb table. The Western Armenian verb table can be found here.

== Conjugations ==
=== Affirmative/Interrogative ===
==== Type I/II ====
(This conjugation is termed "I/II" to coincide with historic/Western numbering, where there are still three distinct conjugations)

Note that traditional Armenian grammars use Aorist for Preterite and Optative for Subjunctive. In Armenian, gerunds / gerundives / converbs (verbal noun) are interchangeable with an English relative clause. For example,

նամակ գրող մարդը namak groġ mardə - The man who is writing a letter / The man writing a letter (there is only a present tense gerund in English)

նամակ գրած մարդը namak grac mardə - The man who has written a letter

մարդու գրելիք նամակը mardu grelik’ namakə - The letter that the man will write (roughly, "the man's will-be written letter")

Additionally, the synchronical gerund or present participle II denotes a simultaneous action. In other words, a concurrency between two verbs:

Ես վազելիս ընկա yes vazelis ənka - I fell while running

Note: the Conditional mood is sometimes labeled the Hypothetical mood; in the Necessative, պետք է petk’ ē is used as a stronger form of պիտի piti; and that resultive constructions are not moods. They convey a state as a result from a prior action. Compare:

նստում եմ nstum em, I am sitting down, and նստած եմ nstac em, I am sitting.

կառուցվում է kaṙuc’voum ē, it is getting built, and կառուցված է kaṙuc’vac ē, it is built.

Indicative
	Present		Imperfect		Preterite / Aorist		Future		Perfect		Pluperfect		Future Perfect	
	Singular	Plural	Singular	Plural	Singular	Plural	Singular	Plural	Singular	Plural	Singular	Plural	Singular	Plural
1st person	սիրում եմ sirum em	սիրում ենք sirum enk’	սիրում էի sirum ēi	սիրում էինք sirum ēink’	սիրեցի sirec’i	սիրեցինք sirec’ink’	սիրելու եմ sirelu em	սիրելու ենք sirelu enk’	սիրել եմ sirel em	սիրել ենք sirel enk’	սիրել էի sirel ēi	սիրել էինք sirel ēink’	սիրելու էի sirelu ēi	սիրելու էինք sirelu ēink’
2nd person	սիրում ես sirum es	սիրում եք sirum ek’	սիրում էիր sirum ēir	սիրում էիք sirum ēik’	սիրեցիր sirec’ir	սիրեցիք sirec’ik’	սիրելու ես sirelu es	սիրելու եք sirelu ek’	սիրել ես sirel es	սիրել եք sirel ek’	սիրել էիր sirel ēir	սիրել էիք sirel ēik’	սիրելու էիր sirelu ēir	սիրելու էիք sirelu ēik’
3rd person	սիրում է sirum ē	սիրում են sirum en	սիրում էր sirum ēr	սիրում էին sirum ēin	սիրեց sirec’	սիրեցին sirec’in	սիրելու է sirelu ē	սիրելու են sirelu en	սիրել է sirel ê	սիրել են sirel en	սիրել էր sirel ēr	սիրել էին sirel ēin	սիրելու էր sirelu ēr	սիրելու էին sirelu ēin
Subjunctive / Optative					Conditional / Hypothetical									
	Future		Future Perfect		Future I		Future Perfect I		Future II		Future Perfect II			
	Singular	Plural	Singular	Plural	Singular	Plural	Singular	Plural	Singular	Plural	Singular	Plural		
1st person	սիրեմ sirem	սիրենք sirenk’	սիրեի sirei	սիրեինք sireink’	կսիրեմ ksirem	կսիրենք ksirenk’	կսիրեի ksirei	կսիրեինք ksireink’	սիրած կլինեմ sirac klinem	սիրած կլինենք sirac klinenk’	սիրած կլինեի sirac klinei	սիրած կլինեինք sirac klineink’		
2nd person	սիրես sires	սիրեք sirek’	սիրեիր sireir	սիրեիք sireik’	կսիրես ksires	կսիրեք ksirek’	կսիրեիր ksireir	կսիրեիք ksireik’	սիրած կլինես sirac klines	սիրած կլինեք sirac klinek’	սիրած կլինեիր sirac klineir	սիրած կլինեիք sirac klineik’		
3rd person	սիրի siri	սիրեն siren	սիրեր sirer	սիրեին sirein	կսիրի ksiri	կսիրեն ksiren	կսիրեր ksirer	կսիրեին ksirein	սիրած կլինի sirac klini	սիրած կլինեն sirac klinen	սիրած կլիներ sirac kliner	սիրած կլինեին sirac klinein		
Necessetative									Imperative		Resultive			
	Future I		Future Perfect I		Future II		Future Perfect II		Present		Present		Present	
	Singular	Plural	Singular	Plural	Singular	Plural	Singular	Plural	Singular	Plural	Singular	Plural	Singular	Plural
1st person	պիտի սիրեմ piti sirem	պիտի սիրենք piti sirenk’	պիտի սիրեի piti sirei	պիտի սիրեինք piti sireink’	սիրած պիտի լինեմ sirac piti linem	սիրած պիտի լինենք sirac piti linenk’	սիրած պիտի լինեի sirac piti linei	սիրած պիտի լինեինք sirac piti lineink’			սիրած եմ sirac em	սիրած ենք sirac enk’	սիրած էի sirac ēi	սիրած էինք sirac ēink’
2nd person	պիտի սիրես piti sires	պիտի սիրեք piti sirek’	պիտի սիրեիր piti sireir	սիրեիք piti sireik’	սիրած պիտի լինես sirac piti lines	սիրած պիտի լինեք sirac piti linek’	սիրած պիտի լինեիր sirac piti lineir	սիրած պիտի լինեիք sirac piti lineik’	սիրի՛ր sirir!	սիրեցե՛ք sirec’ek’!	սիրած ես sirac es	սիրած եք sirac ek’	սիրած էիր sirac ēir	սիրած եիք sirac ēik’
3rd person	պիտի սիրի piti siri	պիտի սիրեն piti siren	պիտի սիրեր piti sirer	պիտի սիրեին piti sirein	սիրած պիտի լինի sirac piti lini	սիրած պիտի լինեն sirac piti linen	սիրած պիտի լիներ sirac piti liner	սիրած պիտի լինեին sirac piti linein			սիրած է sirac ē	սիրած են sirac en	սիրած էր sirac ēr	սիրած եին sirac ēin
Verbals														
Infinitive	սիրել sirel													
Passive Infinitive	սիրվել sirvel													
Present Gerund	սիրող siroġ													
Present Participle	սիրում sirum													
Synchronal Gerund	սիրելիս sirelis													
Past Participle	սիրել sirel													
Past Gerund	սիրած sirac													
Future Participle	սիրելու sirelu													
Future Gerund	սիրելիք sirelik’													

==== Type III ====
(This conjugation is termed "III" (instead of "II") to coincide with historic/Western numbering, where there are still three distinct conjugations)

Indicative

Present

Imperfect
Preterite
Future
1sg

2sg
3sg
1pl
2pl
3pl

yes

du
na
menk'
duk'
nrank'

kardum em

kardum es
kardum ê
kardum enk'
kardum ek'
kardum en

kardum êi

kardum êir
kardum êr
kardum êink'
kardum êik'
kardum êin

kardac'i

kardac'ir
kardac'
kardac'ink'
kardac'ik'
kardac'in

kardalu yem

kardalu yes
kardalu ê
kardalu yenk'
kardalu yek'
kardalu yen

Perfect
Pluperfect
Fut. Perfect
1sg

2sg
3sg
1pl
2pl
3pl

kardac'el em

kardac'el es
kardac'el ê
kardac'el enk'
kardac'el ek'
kardac'el en

kardac'el êi

kardac'el êir
kardac'el êr
kardac'el êink'
kardac'el êik'
kardac'el êin

kardalu êi

kardalu êir
kardalu êr
kardalu êink'
kardalu êik'
kardalu êin

Optative

Non-Past

Past
Conditional

Non-Past

Past
1sg

2sg
3sg
1pl
2pl
3pl

kardam

kardas
karda
kardank'
kardak'
kardan

kardayi

kardayir
kardar
kardayink'
kardayik'
kardayin

kkardam

kkardas
kkarda
kkardank'
kkardak'
kkardan

kkardayi

kkardayir
kkardar
kkardayink'
kkardayik'
kkardayin

Jussive

Non-Past

Past
Imperative

1sg

2sg
3sg
1pl
2pl
3pl

piti kardam

piti kardas
piti karda
piti kardank'
piti kardak'
piti kardan

piti kardayi

piti kardayir
piti kardar
piti kardayink'
piti kardayik'
piti kardayin

karda!

kardac'ek'!

Infinitive

Gerund
Present Participle I

Present Participle II
Past Act. Participle
Past Pass. Participle
Future Participle

kardal (to read)

kardac'ogh
kardum
kardalis
kardac'el
kardac'ac
kardalu

=== Negative ===
==== Type I ====
Note: the formation of the negative is the same for all conjugations. The examples below are based on the first conjugation.

Indicative

Present

Imperfect
Preterite
Future
1sg

2sg
3sg
1pl
2pl
3pl

yes

du
na
menk'
duk'
nrank'

ch'em sirum

ch'es sirum
ch'i sirum
ch'enk' sirum
ch'ek' sirum
ch'en sirum

ch'êi sirum

ch'êir sirum
ch'êr sirum
ch'êink' sirum
ch'êik' sirum
ch'êin sirum

ch'sirec'i

ch'sirec'ir

ch'sirec'
ch'sirec'ink'
ch'sirec'ik'
ch'sirec'in

ch'em sirelu

ch'es sirelu
ch'i sirelu
ch'enk' sirelu
ch'ek' sirelu
ch'en sirelu

Perfect
Pluperfect
Fut. Perfect
1sg

2sg
3sg
1pl
2pl
3pl

ch'em sirel

ch'es sirel
ch'i sirel
ch'enk' sirel
ch'ek' sirel
ch'en sirel

ch'êi sirel

ch'êir sirel
ch'êr sirel
ch'êink' sirel
ch'êik' sirel
ch'êin sirel

ch'êi sirelu

ch'êir sirelu
ch'êr sirelu
ch'êink' sirelu
ch'êik' sirelu
ch'êin sirelu

Optative

Non-Past

Past
Conditional

Non-Past

Past
1sg

2sg
3sg
1pl
2pl
3pl

ch'sirem

ch'sires
ch'siri
ch'sirenk'
ch'sirek'
ch'siren

ch'sirei

ch'sireir
ch'sirer
ch'sireink'
ch'sireik'
ch'sirein

ch'em siri

ch'es siri
ch'i siri
ch'enk' siri
ch'ek' siri
ch'en siri

ch'êi siri

ch'êir siri
ch'êr siri
ch'êink' siri
ch'êik' siri
ch'êin siri

Jussive

Non-Past

Past
Imperative

1sg

2sg
3sg
1pl
2pl
3pl

*piti ch'sirem

piti ch'sires
piti ch'siri
piti ch'sirenk'
piti ch'sirek'
piti ch'siren

*piti ch'sirei

piti ch'sireir
piti ch'sirer
piti ch'sireink'
piti ch'sireik'
piti ch'sirein

mi sirir! ~ mi siri!

mi sirec'ek'! ~ mi sirek'!

Infinitive

Gerund
Present Participle I
Present Participle II
Past Act. Participle
Past Pass. Participle
Future Participle

ch'sirel (to not love)

ch'sirogh
ch'sirum
ch'sirelis
ch'sirel
ch'sirac
ch'sirelu

Note: the negative jussive forms may also be (in Eastern Armenian) ch'piti sirem, ch'piti sires, etc; ch'piti sirei, ch'piti sireir, etc.
