= St. Karapet's Church, Rostov-on-Don =

Coordinates: 47.2369°N 39.7522°E

St. Karapet's Church
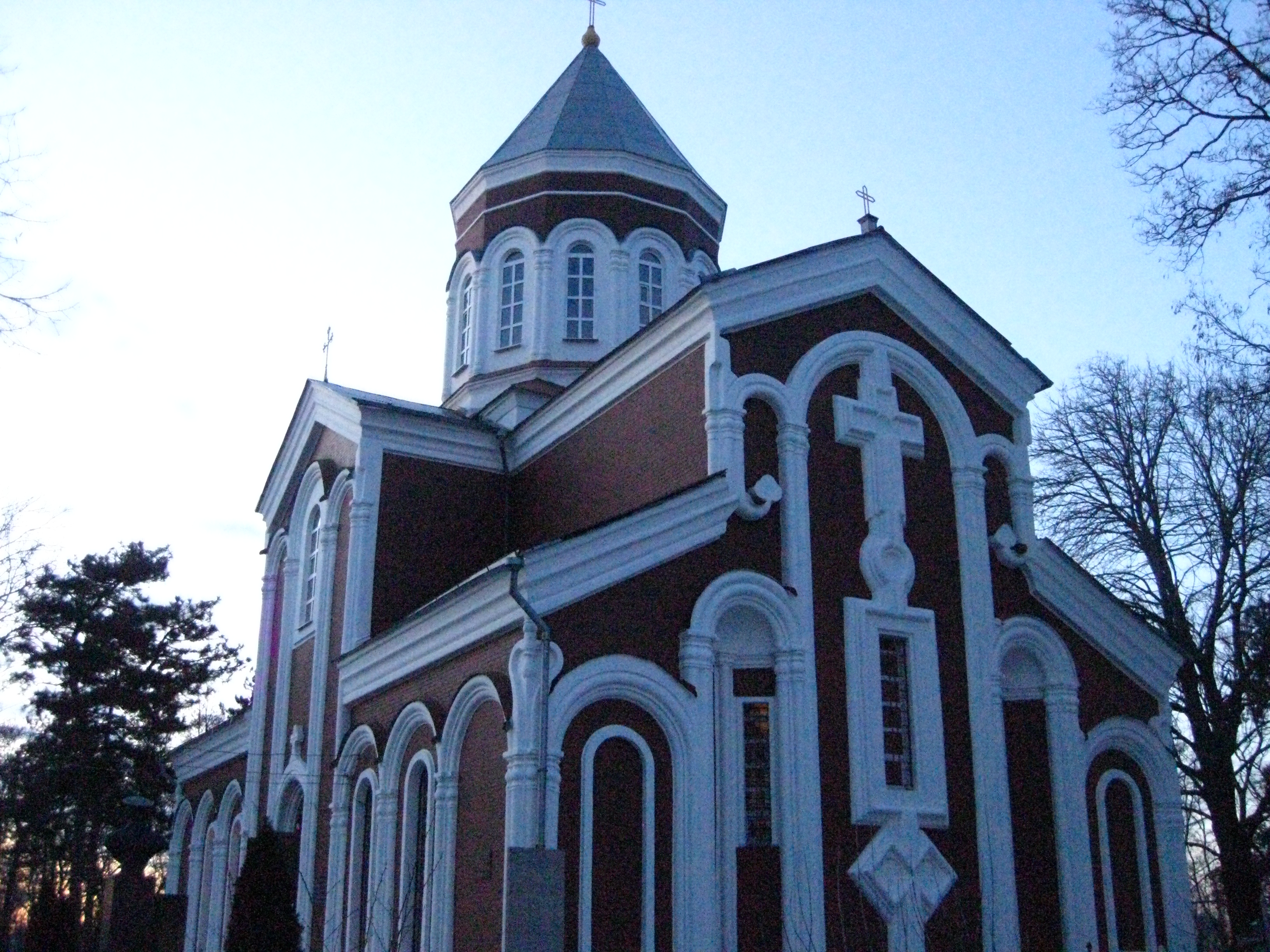

Religion
- Affiliation: Armenian Apostolic Church

Location
- Location: Rostov-on-Don, Rostov Oblast, Russia
- Interactive map of St. Karapet's Church

Architecture
- Architect: Vasiliy Sazonov
- Completed: 1881

Church of Saint Karapet (Armenian: Դոնի Ռոստովի Սուրբ Կարապետ եկեղեցի, Russian: Церковь Святого Карапета) is the only Armenian Church in Nakhichevan-on-Don which has survived to the present day (with the exception of the Holy Cross Church, which was outside the city limits). It is situated on the territory of the Armenian (Proletarian) Cemetery near its eastern fence.

== History ==
St. Karapet church was founded in 1875 (its architect was Vasiliy Sazonov), and was consecrated on July 11, 1881. The history of the construction of the temple is associated with the name Nakhichevan noblewoman Akulina Pogosovna Aladjalova, who died in 1871. Aladjalova bequeathed her fortune for the "construction of a stone church at the Armenian cemetery in the name of John the Baptist, as well as establishment of Trustees house, well and houses for the residence of the poor homeless Armenian families". Aladjalova was buried under the south-western wall of the church.

== Exterior ==
Spatial composition of St. Karapet church was constructed in a combination of basilica and cross-in-square forms.

== Interior ==
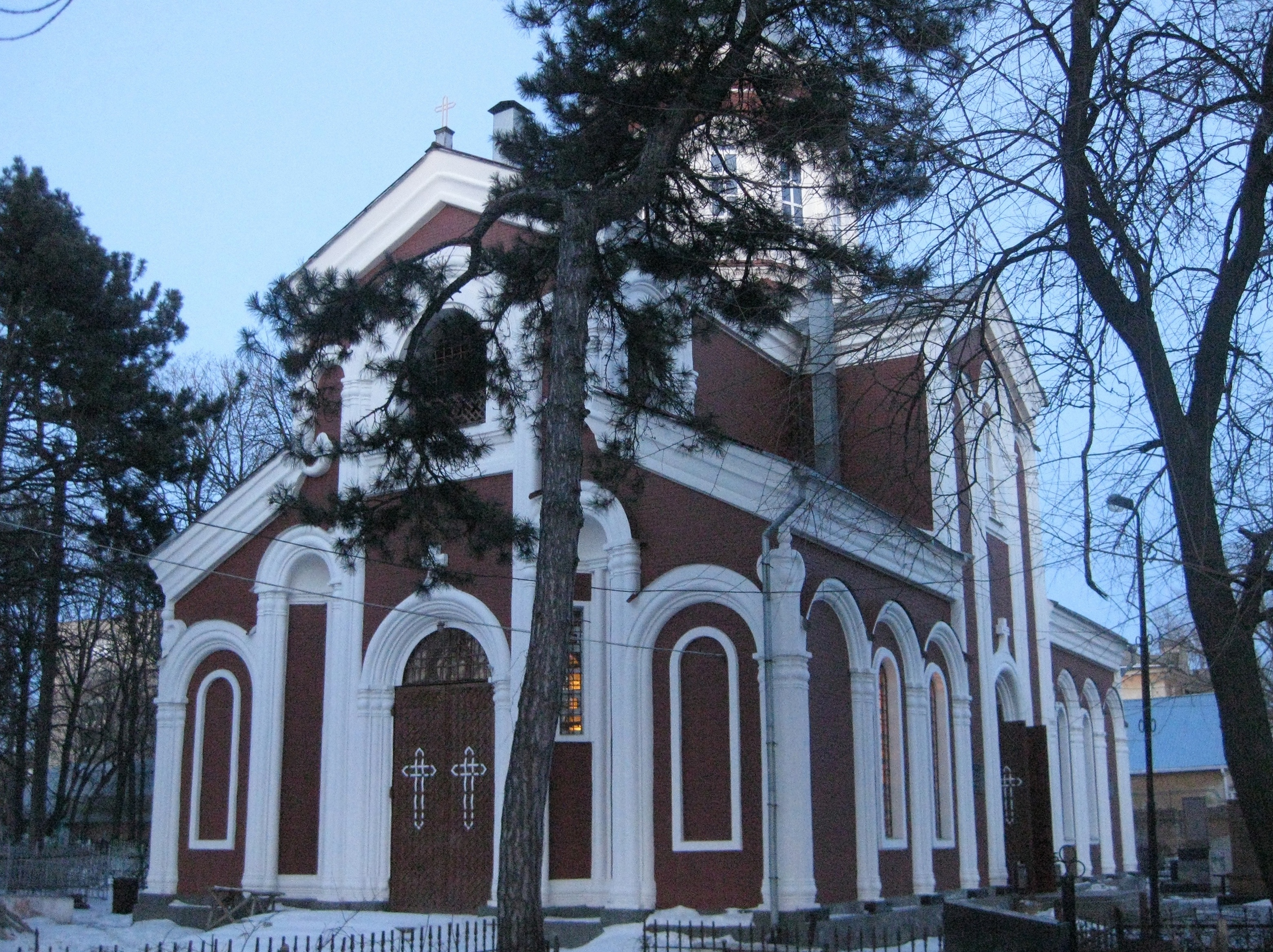

Church of St. Karapet had long been the only one among all the churches in the city which was built in the Armenian style (prior to the opening on the site of the destroyed during the Soviet era cathedral, Church of the Holy Sunday in 2011.

== Sources ==
- Г. Есаулов, В. Черницына, Архитектурная летопись Ростова-на-Дону, Ростов-на-Дону, 1999.
- В. Лобжанидзе, Г. Лаптев, Путешествие по Старому Ростову, Ростов-на-Дону, 1997.
- В. Лобжанидзе, Г. Лаптев, В. Кустов, Путешествие по Старому Ростову, Ростов-на-Дону, 2001, часть 2.
