= Samvel Karapetyan =

Samvel Karapetyan may refer to:

- Samvel Karapetyan (author) (1961–2020), Armenian historian, researcher and author
- Samvel Karapetyan (businessman) (born 1966), Armenian-born Russian businessman
- Samvel Karapetyan (general) (born 1962), Artsakh Armenian general
