= Farrah Karapetian =

American visual artist

Farrah Karapetian (born 1978) is an American visual artist. She works primarily in cameraless photography, incorporating multiple mediums in her process including sculpture, theatre, drawing, creative nonfiction, and social practice. She is especially known for her work that "marries two traditions in photography — that of the staged picture and of the image made without a camera." Recurrent concerns include the agency of the individual versus that of authority and the role of the body in determining that agency.

== Biography ==
Farrah Karapetian was born in Marin, California to Hamidatun and Aswan Karapetian, and grew up in Highland Park in northeast Los Angeles. Her father was a graphic designer and drummer, and her mother has degrees in culinary anthropology and bicultural education; together her parents founded WizdomInc, a publishing company dedicated to providing equal access to topical subjects in education and professions to English-language learners. Her parents were active members of SUBUD.

Karapetian earned a Bachelor of Arts from Yale University in 2000. She majored in fine art with a concentration in photography. She earned a Master of Fine Arts from the University of California at Los Angeles in 2008; her thesis committee consisted of James Welling, Charles Ray, Lari Pittman, and Mary Kelly, reflecting her interest in experimental photography, space and scale, the politics of imagery, and the phenomenology of visual experience, respectively.

Karapetian teaches in the Department of Art, Architecture + Art History and is affiliate faculty with Africana Studies at the University of San Diego. She has taught visual arts at multiple universities, including courses at Otis College of Art and Design that underscored her interest in the history of the photography of unrest and in the history and practice of the house in and as contemporary art. She is a frequent speaker and panelist, including especially on topics such as Philosophy and Photography at the Los Angeles County Museum of Art and on various topics relating to the politics of visual space in a recurring relationship with the Wende Museum.

Karapetian's writing on the politics of visual culture has been published by the Los Angeles Review of Books, and in English and Norwegian on Seismopolite. Her research and writing on the house in and as contemporary art was funded by a Andy Warhol Foundation Arts Writers Grant in 2013. Her writing on photography has been published by The Brooklyn Rail, Whitehot Magazine, Artslant, and Nonsite. She was part of Archivo Platform's Research Network in 2021. In addition to this criticism, Karapetian has published essays and chapters that accompany her visual output, such as "You Don't Have to Believe Me", for the volume, Performative Representations of Working-Class Laborers: They Work Hard for the Money. She considers writing a part of her art practice.

== Work ==
Karapetian's cameraless photography is understood as experimental in the lineage of Henry Holmes Smith and Robert Heinecken, but discussed alongside artists such as Matthew Brandt and Chris McCaw as being part of a generation of artists "rematerializing photography." The work does not resist the digital, but provides alternative routes through the changing mental and physical landscape of a digital era. "More like a metaphor than a record, Karapetian's work in photography "generates for viewers enough interference to disrupt and call attention to our era's deeply entrenched response of permitting the constant newsfeed of documentary to slide by us as political ephemera." It is included in textbooks such as Global Photography: A Critical History (Routledge 2020) and The Focal Press Companion to the Constructed Image in Contemporary Photography (Routledge 2019) as well as Photography is Magic! (Aperture Press 2015.)

Karapetian's cameraless photographic explorations of her own family's trajectory of migration were funded by the Pollock-Krasner Foundation in 2017. In this as in each of her projects, she reimagines the nature of the photographic negative, often using humans and sculptural props to cast shadows, and then exhibiting these adjacent to the prints. The result was an abstract exploration of movement and vulnerability called "Relief" as well as a series in which she built and unbuilt walls called "Building Dwelling Thinking", which Leah Ollman called "gloriously elusive" and "subject to a multiplicity of readings - optical, metaphorical, even political."

Her research on Vsevolod Meyerhold through the Fulbright Program in St. Petersburg, Russia in 2018 emphasized the body as the arbiter of authenticity in revolutionary creative practice. This project isolated the performative nature of her work with populations playing active parts in their own representation. Returning from Russia, in 2019, she worked with friends in the transgender community in Los Angeles to map a defunct bar from memory. She recreated the bar from their floorpans for a project called "Collective Memory" at the Von Lintel Gallery; The gallery in this case became the community hub again, and a space of art's production as well.

When Covid-19 closed darkrooms and galleries for quarantine, she reevaluated the core of her practice and began to emphasize the interrogative nature of building a photograph from stories. her practice shifted towards scripting and scoring memory rather than working from photographs. The Wende Museum invited her to participate in an exhibition about "political but also a material transformation." She chose a painting by Boris Spornikov of women creating a Lenin mural with flower petals; the faith they exhibited made her question what kinds of faith people exhibit now. She asked students in quarantine and worked with a choir in quarantine as well, producing a video and a musical score that resulted from this iterative process.

These projects had less to do with community engagement than with the translations of memory into different phases of production. Still, she has often worked with communities in public space. In 2014, she was the lead artist on a project with the Angels Gate Cultural Center in San Pedro, California called “Service and Other Stories,” in which veterans of the U.S. Armed Forces culled from their own memories. In 2012, she worked with students at East Los Angeles College to mine their and their families' experiences of protest in Southern California, leading a program called “Directed Studies: Los Angeles Times.” Also in 2012, she worked with residents of Flint, Michigan to represent their own and their city's growth as part of the Flint Public Art Project. In 2025, she worked with female leaders from Cúcuta, Colombia to create an ephemeral mural of resistance for Km 4951 of the Bienalsur.

The Russian revolutionary research also served as a starting point for her research into the relevance of the creative output of the interwar period for the present day. Her work on a largely female network from that period began in 2021 with a grant from the City of Los Angeles and results in both visual and verbal forms, including publication of a portfolio by artist Ida Kar, a portfolio in the Caribbean Review of Gender Studies of Karapetian's speculative imagery photogrammed on top of a feature length film script she wrote about the intersection of the Nardal sisters with other women in Paris, and a review of an exhibition of Claude Cahun and Marcel Moore's work at the Contemporary Art Museum St. Louis. Karapetian introduced a course called The Black Mirror at the University of San Diego guided by this research, which produces a journal each time it is offered.

After the full-scale invasion of Ukraine, she shifted her focus in the post Soviet space from Russia to Uzbekistan, where she followed Langston Hughes' original path in 1932 to the cotton fields of Central Asia. In 2022, she worked with multiple generations of residents of Tashkent to unpack their memories while picking cotton for the state. Her first residency at the Ilkhom Theatre in Tashkent through CEC Artslink was followed by a residency at Art Station in Samarkand with the Silk Road University in 2024. Her research, oral histories, cyanotype prints, and video work in this region motivated a parallel project in Mexicali, Mexico, often in collaboration with the Archivo Familiar del Rio Colorado.

In her studio work, her writing and speaking, and her public projects, "Karapetian explicitly recodes photography, turning an act of reproduction into one of production."

== Selected collections ==
Karapetian's artwork is held in permanent collections that include, J. Paul Getty Museum, Los Angeles, CA; Wende Museum of the Cold War, Culver City, CA; Los Angeles County Museum of Art, Los Angeles, CA; San Francisco Museum of Modern Art, San Francisco, CA.
