= Garo Tavitjan =

Macedonian drummer (born 1982)

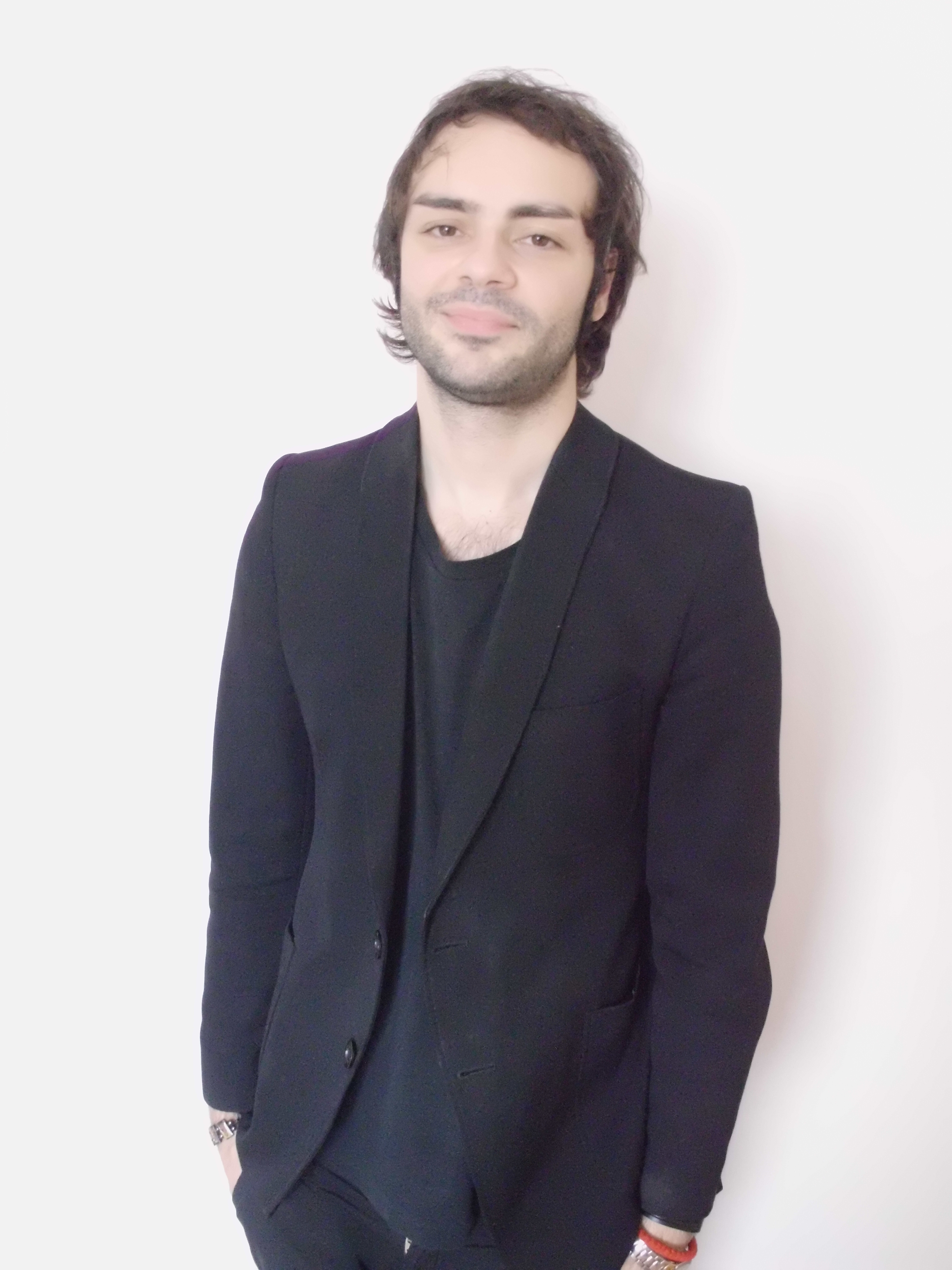

Background information
- Born: Garo Tavitjan; 24 June 1982 (age 43)
- Origin: Skopje, North Macedonia
- Genres: Jazz; contemporary
- Occupations: Drummer; composer; producer
- Instrument: Drums

Garo Tavitjan (Garo Tavitjan, Jr., Macedonian: Гарo Тавитјан) is a Macedonian drummer, composer, arranger, pianist and producer of Armenian descent (Armenian father and Serbian mother). He performed over 500 concert performances in Europe, England, Asia, the United States, Armenia, and the Balkans.

Garo Tavitjan has performed and collaborated with Frank Gambale, Mike Stern, Eric Marienthal, Oz Noy, Morris Pleasure, Fernando Saunders, Larry Monroe, The Jazz Ambassadors, Roseanna Vitro, Dean Brown, Lee Roy, Clivia Tanisi, Rhani Krija, Andrea Palazzo, James East, Dave Weckl etc.

== Biography ==
Garo Tavitjan was born in 1982 in Skopje, in the family of drummer Garabet Tavitjan. His brother Diran Tavitjan is a pianist and perform in "The Tavitjan Brothers" duet.

Garo started elementary music school at the age of 5, afterwards, he studied in the state music high school (Ilija Nikolovski Luj - MBUC). His first concert performance was at the age of 12 during his father's concert. In 1996 he joined the Jazz/Rock group Garo & Paramecium (where Diran Tavitjan was a keyboardist and composer) where he started as a guest second soloist drummer besides his father Garabet Tavitjan. After 7 years Garo performed with the whole band as the main drummer on many occasions and tours. In 2002 Garo Tavitjan and Diran Tavitjan started a trio including Aleksandar Ikonomov on Bass. The trio recorded a promo album called DSG Trio - One Mike Session published by Paramecium Production. In 2003 Garo Tavitjan and Diran Tavitjan started the Tavitjan Brothers trio including Dragan Trajkovski on Acoustic Bass. This trio released a Live album called Tavitjan Brothers which was a part of the SONY UK Jazz competition. The tracks from the album of Tavitjan Brothers were released on the Sony Jazz Compilation release of the same competition. The album has received a 5-star review in the Austrian Concerto magazine.

Tavitjan Brothers has started with touring in the Balkans, Europe, Switzerland, Norway, England, USA, and Armenia including soldout concerts at Carnegie Hall, Blue Note (NYC), Nublu, Drummers Collective (NYC), London Jazz Festivals, Switzerland Jazz Festivals, Poland Jazz festivals, Spain Beer Fest, Italy Jazz festival, France Jazz and many other European Jazz festivals. Tavitjan brothers have performed German tours at festivals in Koln, Dusseldorf, Essen, Viersen Dortmund, etc. They performed at Sava Centar in Belgrade, Cankarjev Dom in Ljubljana, philharmonic hall in Ljubljana, philharmonic hall in Sofia (Bulgaria), Bansko Jazz Festival, EXIT Festival in Novi Sad, SKC in Belgrade, Atejle 212 in Belgrade, philharmonic hall in Nish, city square in Tirana (Albania), Oda Theatre in Pristina, Opatija Liburnia Ex-Tempore workshops, Opatija Villa Angelina concert, Pula Jazz Festival, Saxo club in Zagreb, Momiano Rock Festival and many other Balkan jazz festivals.

== Discography ==
Solo albums

- Garo Tavitjan - Urban Groove
- Garo Tavitjan - Personal View
- Garo Tavitjan - Macedonian Rhythms & Improvisation

Albums with his group Tavitjan Brothers

- Tavitjan Brothers - One Mike Session
- Tavitjan Brothers - Tavitjan Brothers (Standards)
- Tavitjan Brothers - Play Classics

Albums with Garabet & Tavitjan Brothers

- Macedonian Heart Beats in 7/8
- Macedonian Heart Beats in 7/8 (part II)
- Macedonian Heart Beats in 7/8 - Skopsko Brewery edition
- Macedonian Heart Beats in 7/8 (part II) - Skopsko Brewery edition

Albums with Garo & Paramecium

- Garo & Paramecium - Best of
- Garo & Paramecium - A Bre Makedonce
- Garo & Paramecium - A Bre Makedonce - Tea Edition

== See also ==
- Armenians in North Macedonia
