= Armenian Cemetery, Rostov-on-Don =

Armenian Cemetery
- Interactive map of Armenian Cemetery

Details
- Location: Rostov-on-Don
- Country: Russia
- Coordinates: 47°17′29″N 39°43′13″E
- Size: 1.4 km^{2} (0.54 sq mi)

Armenian Cemetery is a cemetery in the city of Rostov-on-Don, Russia. Officially known as Proletarian Cemetery. It is situated in the Proletarian District of the city.

== History ==
It was opened in 1749 and called Armenian Cemetery.

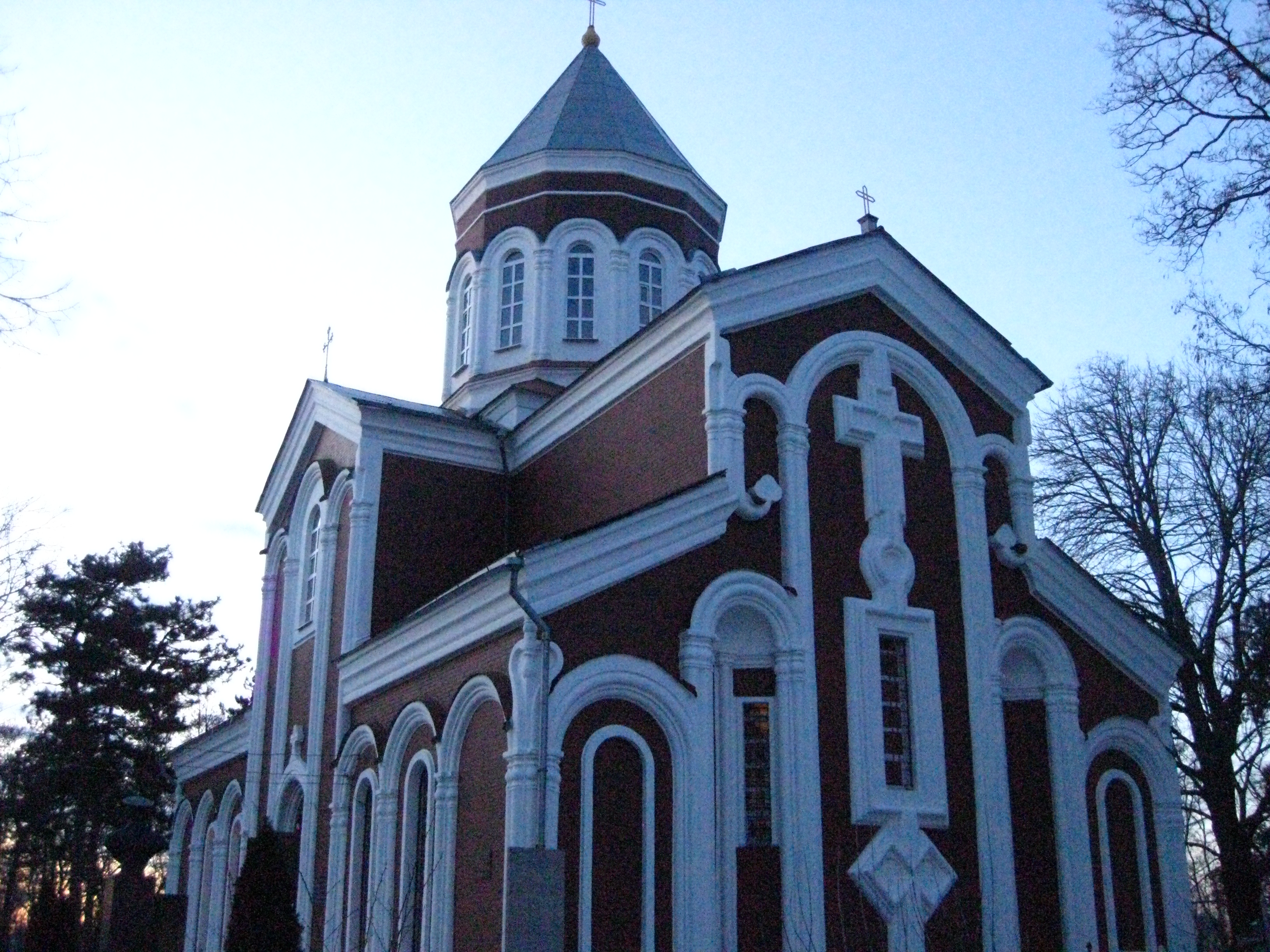
St. Karapet's Church

The total area of the cemetery is about 14 hectares.

For many years of its existence the cemetery has been vandalized several times. It also had been in a state of neglect because of improper maintenance. Currently restoration works are being carried out.

At the cemetery there are also situated common graves of soldiers who died in World War II and a monument dedicated to them. The inscription on it reads: "Glory to the heroes who fell in battles fighting for freedom and independence of our homeland, 1941–1945".

Many of the monuments at the Armenian cemetery were made by eminent Italian sculptor Selvester Antonio Tonitto. He lived in Rostov-on-Don and was the owner of a workshop where tombstones and monuments were manufactured.
