= Messia Garabedian =

- Born: August 31, 1993 (age 33); Baghdad, Iraq
- Origin: Armenian
- Genres: Pop music
- Years active: 2007-present
- Label: MG Productions
- Website: www.messiagarabedian.com

Messia Garabedian (Armenian: Մեսիա Կարապետյան), is an Armenian singer and musician based in Amsterdam.

== Early years and career ==
Messia Garabedian was born in Baghdad, Iraq on August 31, 1993. He is originally from Armenia. Messia is known for his traditional Armenian wedding songs. He has released two albums and has performed in Armenia, Belgium, Brazil, Canada, France, Germany, Greece, Jordan, Luxemburg, and the Netherlands. Music critics have stated that “he is something different." He is also a pianist in the Armenian community in the Netherlands.

== Personal life ==
He married Russian-American woman Hasmik Gabrieljan. His uncle, Christopher Garabedian, is also a musician.
