= Karo Mkrtchyan =

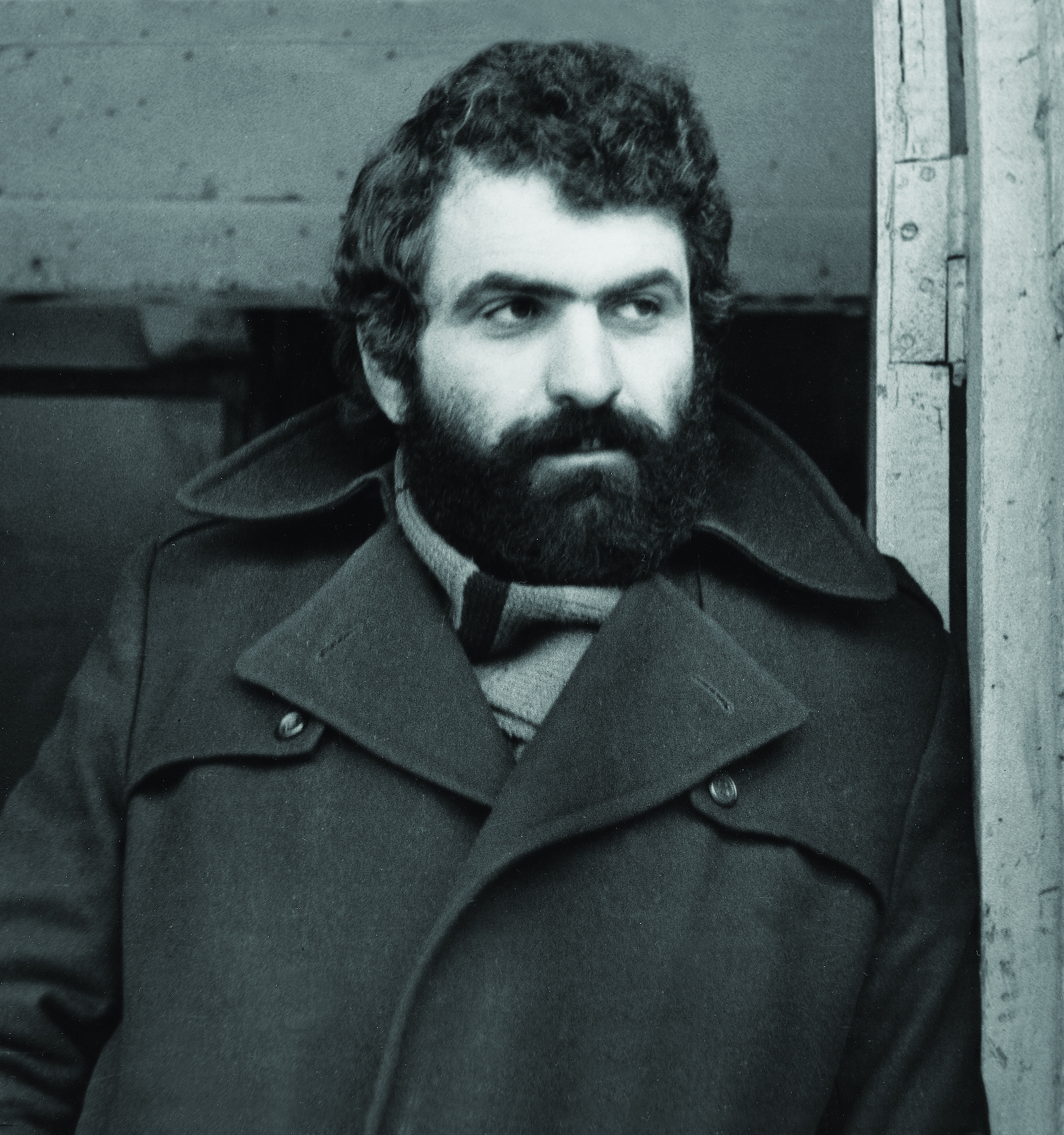
Karo Mkrtchyan

Karo Mkrtchyan (Armenian: Կարո Մկրտչյան, 28 March 1951 – 2001) was a well-known Armenian painter and public figure. He was aligned with the avant-garde movement. An independent and freethinker, Karo fled the USSR's cultural blockade. For much of his life Karo Mkrtchyan lived and painted outside his native USSR.

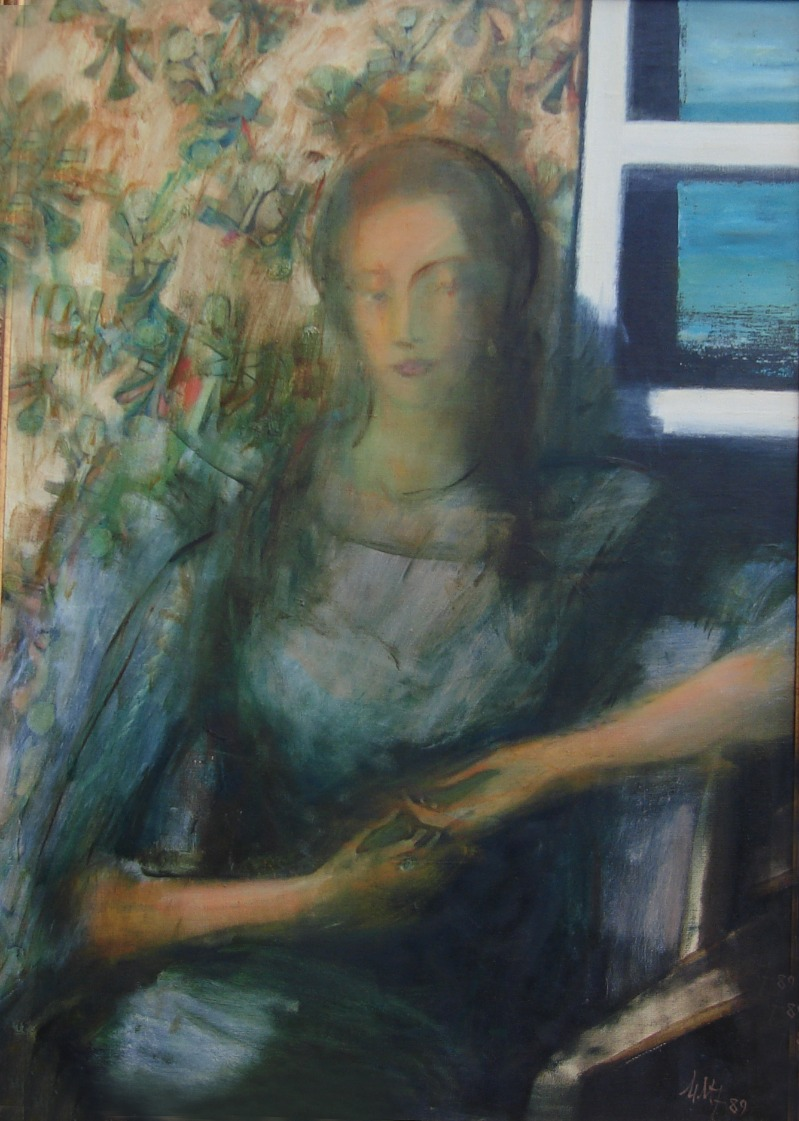
Karo's Painting "By The Window" 1989

== Biography ==
Karo Mkrtchyan was born in the Banants village, Gardman Province of Artsakh, Armenia. In 1968 he left secondary school. Karo became a member of the Artists' Union of Armenia in 1971 and two years later, in 1973, graduated from the Yerevan State Institute of Art and Drama. In 1981 he was nominated as a member of the Union of Artists of the USSR. He graduated from the Moscow Academy of Painting in 1982. From 1996, Karo was a member of International Association of Artists UNESCO. From 1996 to 1999 he worked in Paris at the International Association of Art. Karo Mkrtchyan died in Yerevan in 2001.

== Expositions ==
- Since 1967 in Armenia
- Since 1974 in Russia
- 1980 Uzbekistan, Tashkent
- 1981 Russia, Moscow
- 1982 Japan, Tokyo
- 1982 Estonia, Lithuania, Latvia
- 1983 Bulgaria, Sofia
- 1984 Ukraine, Gurzuf
- 1984 Germany, Norway, Denmark, Hungary, Egypt, Italy, Finland
- 1985 Russia, Moscow
- 1985 Ukraine, Kiev
- 1987 Spain, Madrid
- 1989 Russia, Novosibirsk
- 1990 India, Delhi
- 1994 UAE, Dubai
- 1996 France, Paris
- 1997 UAE, Dubai and in other countries Prizes
- 1969 The First prize for “Autumn” picture, in the child group of RCP. of Transcaucasia
- 1978 State prize of Armenia in the nomination “The best work of year”
- 1983 In the International competition in Sofia, the prize "The best artist"
- 1983 YCL prize of Armenia
- 1986 The first prize awarded for painting at the international exhibition in Sofia

== Press articles about Karo Mkrtchyan ==
Speaking to and seeing the paintings of this Armenian artist makes clear in this age of the camera image that any picture with an iota of art is more than story telling, then portraiture. Only if you free these and other subjects from the bonds of motives and their actions, causes and effects, and from all bonds but those of affection, these will transmute, become symbols of pure emotion. The images we see through the camera, as also via some illusionist art, are finite and temporal, those of imaginative art are timeless.
-- "India Times"

Armenian and foreign press wrote a lot about Karo Mkrtchyan's life and activity.

== Prizes ==
- First prize for "Autumn" picture 1969
- State Prize of Armenia in the nomination "The Best Work Of Year" 1978
- The international competition in Sofia, "The Best Artist" 1983
- YCL of Armenia 1983
- First prize awarded for painting at the international exhibition in Sofia 1986.

Paintings are kept in the National Picture Gallery of Armenia, the Museum of Modern Art of Armenia, The Union of Artist of Armenia, in the Fund of the Ministry of Culture of Armenia, the Moscow State Picture galleries, the Art Museum of London, Japan, France, USA and in many private collections.
