= Garo Hamamcıoğlu =

Turkish footballer

Personal information
- Full name: Karabet Hamamcıoğlu
- Date of birth: April 27, 1945 (age 81)
- Place of birth: Istanbul, Turkey

Senior career*
Years	Team	Apps	(Gls)
1963–1965	Taksim SK		
1965–1966	Gölcük Denizgücü		
1967–1980	Sarıyer G.K.	483	(165)
- Taksim SK

Managerial career
- Taksim SK (chairman)
- * Club domestic league appearances and goals

Karabet "Garo" Hamamcıoğlu (born April 27, 1945, in Istanbul) is a former Turkish football player of Armenian descent and current chairman of the sports club Taksim SK in Istanbul, Turkey.

== Biography ==
Hamamcıoğlu was born in Istanbul.

== Playing career ==
He began his football career with Taksim SK in 1963. Taksim SK is a football club represented to Armenian community in Istanbul. He played for the team two seasons. He was then conscripted into Turkish Army in 1965. Whilst serving for military, he also played for Gölcük Denizgücü for one season.

After completing the military service, Hamamcıoğlu transferred in 1967 to the Turkish Second Division team Sarıyer G.K. He played for them for 13 seasons and retired in 1980. Hamamcıoğlu played 483 games in total for Sarıyer G.K., scoring 165 goals. He is currently the third most capped player for Sarıyer G.K.

He was four times the top striker at the Turkish Second Division. Many first division teams tried to sign him, but he stayed with Sarıyer G.K. until his retirement from playing football.

Hamamcıoğlu also briefly played for Taksim SK in the Istanbul Amateur League at the age 35 after he was returned from retirement.

== Club chairman ==
After retiring as a player, Hamamcıoğlu returned to Taksim SK, but this time as an executive. He is currently chairman of the club.

== Other information ==
Garo Hamamcıoğlu was also co-captain of the Turkish-Armenian squad, at the PanArmenian Games.

He is one of the forerunner Armenian origin Turkish nationals, who try to improve relations between Turkish and Armenian people.

He is also a peace activist.

He was against the French Senate’s vote on a controversial bill that criminalises denial of the Armenian genocide.
