= Emma Garo =

Solomon Islands lawyer

Emma Garo (also known as Emma Garo Ma’aramo) is a lawyer and currently Chief Magistrate in the Solomon Islands. She was one of the first qualified women lawyers in the country.

Garo worked as a senior defense legal officer for the Public Solicitors Office in the Solomon Islands before being appointed a principal magistrate in 2007.

In 2014 Garo was appointed a resident magistrate in the island state of Nauru. When her contract was not renewed in 2017, there was some suspicion that this was due to government interference as Garo had sentenced a number of anti-government demonstrators during her tenure.

Garo has also served as a magistrate and Deputy Chief Magistrate in the Honiara Central Magistrates’ Court. In 2017 she was sworn in as the Chief Magistrate, becoming the first female Chief Magistrate in Solomon Islands.

In 2018, Garo was named Woman of Courage. The United States Ambassador to Solomon Islands, Her Excellency Catherine Ebert-Gray presented the 2018 Woman of Courage Award to Garo in honor of her courage and bravery in advocating for women rights and the protection from domestic violence.

Garo's exemplary actions include her assistance in facilitating the escape of an American citizen facing abuse from her husband and the prosecution of her own brother for beating his wife.
