= Eastern Armenian =

Major dialect group and standard form of Armenian

- Արևելահայերեն
- Native to: Armenia, Iran, Georgia, Russia, Ukraine, Central Asia
- Native speakers: 3.8 million (2013)
- Language family: Indo-European: Armenian; Eastern Armenian
- Writing system: Armenian alphabet (virtually always in the reformed orthography, except in Iran)

Language codes
- ISO 639-1: hy
- ISO 639-2: arm (B) hye (T)
- ISO 639-3: hye
- Glottolog: nucl1235
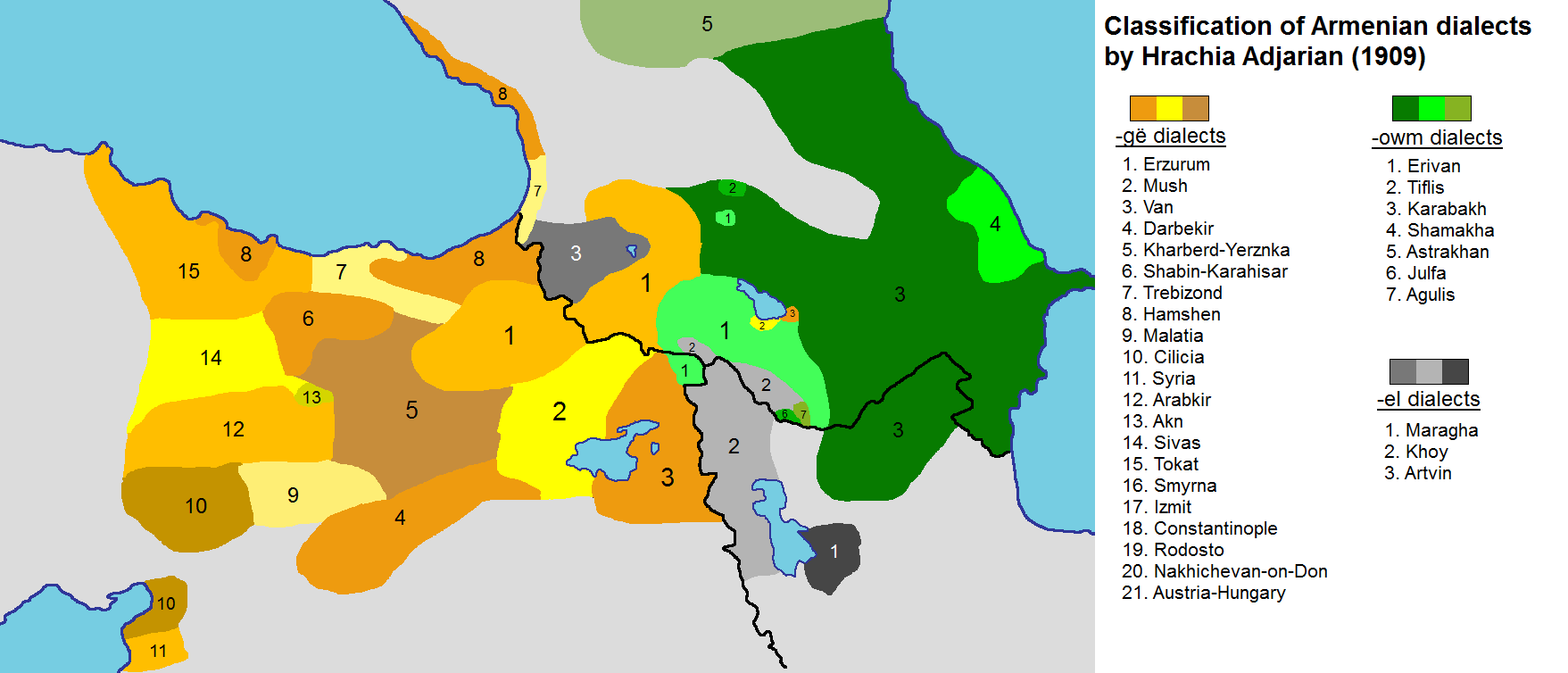
- Map of the Armenian dialects in the early 20th century: -owm dialects, corresponding to Eastern Armenian, are shown in green.

Eastern Armenian (Armenian: արևելահայերեն, romanized: arevelahayeren) is one of the two standardized forms of Modern Armenian, the other being Western Armenian. The two standards form a pluricentric language.

Eastern Armenian developed as a separate standard starting in the eighteenth century. It belongs to the -um branch of Armenian dialects (sometimes called the Eastern branch), distinguished by how the present tense is formed.

Eastern Armenian is spoken in Armenia, Russia, as well as Georgia, and by the Armenian community in Iran. Although the Eastern Armenian spoken by Armenians in Armenia and Iranian-Armenians are similar, there are pronunciation differences with different inflections. Armenians from Iran also have some words that are unique to them. Due to migrations of speakers from Armenia and Iran to the Armenian diaspora, the dialect is now very prominent in countries and regions where only Western Armenian was used.

== History ==
The Armenian language is attested from the 5th century AD, when the Armenian alphabet was invented. The written standard used at that time, known as Classical Armenian (or grabar), remained the preferred literary form of the language until the 19th century, when it was replaced by the new standards, Western and Eastern Armenian. Already in the 17th and 18th centuries, a common form of Armenian, known as Civil Armenian and used by speakers of different dialects, had developed, apparently from the combination of different regional linguistic features. The main centers of Civil Armenian were Istanbul in the West, and Yerevan and Tbilisi in the East. As a result of the development of Civil Armenian, the two standards of Western and Eastern Armenian developed. It is often asserted that standard Eastern Armenian developed from the Yerevan dialect (just as Western Armenian did from the Istanbul dialect) "via a process of standardizing the lexicon, removing recent Turkic borrowings, and incorporating common dialectal features." However, according to Ollie Sayeed and Bert Vaux, there are significant enough differences between the standard forms and their source dialects to doubt this claim; instead, they suggest that the standard dialects developed "from something like Civil Armenian combined with elements of various Western or Eastern dialects, including but not limited to the varieties spoken in the respective capitals."

== Official status and recognition ==
Eastern Armenian is, for the most part, mutually intelligible for educated or literate users of Western Armenian, and vice versa. Conversely, semi-literate or illiterate users of lower registers of either variety may have difficulty understanding the other.

The official language, according to law, of Armenia is an unspecified "Armenian". In practice, however, Eastern Armenian is the de facto day-to-day common language of Armenia. For example, commercial translations are generally completed in Eastern Armenian.

Until 2018, both varieties shared the same ISO 639-3 code: hye. However, on 23 January 2018, a code specifically for Western Armenian was added to ISO 639-3: hyw. (The previous code under ISO 639-1 was hy.)

The Armenian Wikipedia is predominantly composed of Eastern Armenian content. As a result of the amendment to ISO 639-3, a campaign to create a separate Wikipedia for Western Armenian has been approved. This has resulted in separate Wikipedia sites for Eastern Armenian and Western Armenian.

== Phonology ==
=== Vowels ===
==== Monophthongs ====
Eastern Armenian has six monophthong vowel sounds.

	Front	Central	Back
Close	i ⟨ի⟩		u ⟨ու⟩
Mid	ɛ ⟨ե, է⟩	ə ⟨ը⟩	ɔ ⟨ո, օ⟩
Open			ɑ ⟨ա⟩

- The use of ⟨է, ե⟩ and ⟨ո, օ⟩ depends on the vowel's context in the word. See the Orthography section below for details.

=== Consonants ===
This is the Eastern Armenian Consonantal System using symbols from the International Phonetic Alphabet (IPA), followed by the corresponding Armenian letter in angle brackets. Marginal phonemes are in parentheses.

		Labial	Dental/Alveolar		Postalv./ Retroflex	Dorsal	Glottal
		Labial	plain	sibilant	Postalv./ Retroflex	Dorsal	Glottal
Nasal		m ⟨մ⟩	n ⟨ն⟩			(ŋ)	
Plosive/ Affricate	aspirated	pʰ ⟨փ⟩	tʰ ⟨թ⟩	t͡sʰ ⟨ց⟩	t͡ʃʰ ⟨չ⟩	kʰ ⟨ք⟩	
Plosive/ Affricate	tenuis	p ⟨պ⟩	t ⟨տ⟩	t͡s ⟨ծ⟩	t͡ʃ ⟨ճ⟩	k ⟨կ⟩	
Plosive/ Affricate	voiced	b ⟨բ⟩	d ⟨դ⟩	d͡z ⟨ձ⟩	d͡ʒ ⟨ջ⟩	ɡ ⟨գ⟩	
Fricative	voiceless	f ⟨ֆ⟩		s ⟨ս⟩	ʃ ⟨շ⟩	χ ⟨խ⟩	h ⟨հ, յ⟩
Fricative	voiced	v ⟨վ, ւ, ու, ո⟩		z ⟨զ⟩	ʒ ⟨ժ⟩	ʁ ⟨ղ⟩	
Approximant		(ʋ)	l ⟨լ⟩		(ɻ)	j ⟨յ, ե, ի, է⟩	
Vibrant	tap		ɾ ⟨ր⟩				
Vibrant	trill		r ⟨ռ⟩				

- Some of the dialects may realize the tenuis stops as ejectives.
- In traditional orthography, /h/ is written in one of two ways, depending on its context. In reformed orthography, /h/ is written only one way, ⟨հ⟩.
- In traditional orthography, /v/ is written in one of four ways, depending on its context. In reformed orthography, /v/ is written only one way, ⟨վ⟩, except when the letter ⟨և⟩ is used; originally a ligature of ⟨ե⟩ and ⟨ւ⟩, it is treated as a separate letter in reformed orthography.
- In practice, only Iranian-Armenians say [ɻ]; Eastern Armenians from Armenia have shifted the Classical Armenian [ɹ] (ր) to [ɾ]. Dolatian, Sharifzadeh & Vaux 2023, p. 22.
- In traditional orthography, /j/ is written in a number of ways, depending on its context. In reformed orthography, /j/ is written only one way, ⟨յ⟩.

The phonology of Eastern Armenian preserves the Classical Armenian three-way distinction in stops and affricates: one voiced, one voiceless and one aspirated. Compare this to the phonology of the Western Armenian language, which has kept only a two-way distinction: one voiced and one aspirated. (See the Differences in Phonology from Classical Armenian in the Western Armenian language article for details.)

Some Eastern Armenian words contain voiced stop letters pronounced as voiceless aspirated stops, like Western Armenian. For instance, թագավոր (king) is [tʰɑkʰɑˈvɔɾ], not [tʰɑɡɑˈvɔɾ]; other examples are ձիգ ([d͡zikʰ]), ձագ ([d͡zɑkʰ]), կարգ ([kɑɾkʰ]), դադար ([dɑˈtʰɑɾ]), վարագույր ([vɑɾɑˈkʰujɾ]).

== Orthography ==
The Eastern Armenian language is written using either traditional Armenian orthography or reformed Armenian orthography. The controversial reformed orthography was developed during the 1920s in Soviet Armenia and is in widespread use today by Eastern Armenian speakers in Armenia and those in the diaspora that are from Armenia. Eastern Armenian speakers in Iran continue to use the traditional orthography. Nevertheless, writings of either form are mutually intelligible, since the difference between the two orthographies is not large.

== Morphology ==
=== Pronouns ===
Personal pronouns
	singular			plural
	1st person	2nd person	3rd person	1st person	2nd person	3rd person
nominative	ես (es)	դու (du)	նա (na)	մենք (menkʿ)	դուք (dukʿ)	նրանք (nrankʿ)
genitive	իմ (im)	քո (kʿo)	նրա (nra)	մեր (mer)	ձեր (jer)	նրանց (nrancʿ)
dative	ինձ (inj)	քեզ (kʿez)	նրան (nran)	մեզ (mez)	ձեզ (jez)	նրանց (nrancʿ)
accusative	ինձ (inj)	քեզ (kʿez)	նրան (nran)	մեզ (mez)	ձեզ (jez)	նրանց (nrancʿ)
ablative	ինձնից (injnicʿ), ինձանից (injanicʿ)	քեզնից (kʿeznicʿ), քեզանից (kʿezanicʿ)	նրանից (nranicʿ)	մեզնից (meznicʿ), մեզանից (mezanicʿ)	ձեզնից (jeznicʿ), ձեզանից (jezanicʿ)	նրանցից (nrancʿicʿ)
instrumental	ինձնով (injnov), ինձանով (injanov)	քեզնով (kʿeznov), քեզանով (kʿezanov)	նրանով (nranov)	մեզնով (meznov), մեզանով (mezanov)	ձեզնով (jeznov), ձեզանով (jezanov)	նրանցով (nrancʿov)
locative	ինձնում (injnum), ինձանում (injanum)	քեզնում (kʿeznum), քեզանում (kʿezanum)	նրանում (nranum)	մեզնում (meznum), մեզանում (mezanum)	ձեզնում (jeznum), ձեզանում (jezanum)	նրանցում (nrancʿum)

Armenian has T-V distinction, with դու, քո, քեզ used informally and capitalized Դուք, Ձեր, Ձեզ as the polite forms.

=== Nouns ===
Eastern Armenian nouns have seven cases, one more than Western Armenian. They are: nominative (subject), accusative (direct object), genitive (possession), dative (indirect object), ablative (origin), instrumental (means) and locative (position). Of the seven cases, the nominative and accusative, with exceptions, are the same, and the genitive and dative are the same, meaning that nouns have mostly five distinct forms for case. Nouns in Armenian also decline for number (singular and plural), but do not decline for gender (i.e. masculine or feminine).

Declension in Armenian is based on how the genitive is formed. There are several declensions, but two are the most used (genitive in i, and genitive in u):

Ablative	դաշտից /dɑʃˈtit͡sʰ/	դաշտերից /dɑʃtɛˈɾit͡sʰ/	/ɡɑˈɾut͡sʰ/	/ɡɑɾinɛˈɾit͡sʰ/
Instrumental	դաշտով /dɑʃˈtɔv/	դաշտերով /dɑʃtɛˈɾɔv/	/ɡɑˈɾɔv/	/ɡɑɾinɛˈɾɔv/
Locative	դաշտում /dɑʃˈtum/	դաշտերում /dɑʃtɛˈɾum/	/ɡɑˈɾum/	/ɡɑɾinɛˈɾum/

Two notes:
First, notice that the Ablative form in Eastern Armenian is /-it͡s/, where it is -ê in Western Armenian:

Abl.sg WA karê/EA /ɡɑɾut͡sʰ/

Second, notice that in Western Armenian, the plural forms followed the u-declension, while in Eastern Armenian the plural forms follow the i-declension:

Gen.pl WA karineru/EA /ɡɑɾinɛˈɾi/

=== Articles ===
Like some other languages such as English, Armenian has definite and indefinite articles. The indefinite article in Eastern Armenian is /mi/, which precedes the noun:

mi ɡiɾkʰ ('a book', Nom.sg), /mi ɡɾkʰi/ ('of a book', Gen.sg)

The definite article is a suffix attached to the noun, and is one of two forms, either /-ə/ or /-n/, depending on whether the final sound is a vowel or a consonant, and whether a following word begins with a vowel or consonant:

/mɑɾdə/ ('the man', Nom.sg)
/ɡɑɾin/ ('the barley' Nom.sg)
but:
/sɑ mɑɾdn ɛ/ ('This is the man')
/sɑ ɡɑɾin ɛ/ ('This is the barley')

=== Adjectives ===
Adjectives in Armenian do not decline for case or number, and precede the noun:

/lɑv ɡiɾkʰə/ ('the good book', Nom.sg)
/lɑv ɡɾkʰi/ ('of the good book', Gen.sg)

=== Verbs ===
Verbs in Armenian are based on two basic series of forms, a "present" form and an "imperfect" form. From this, all other tenses and moods are formed with various particles and constructions. There is a third form, the preterite, which in Armenian is a tense in its own right, and takes no other particles or constructions. (See also Armenian verbs and Eastern Armenian verb table for more detailed information.)

The present tense in Eastern Armenian is based on two conjugations (a, e). In Eastern Armenian, the distinct conjugations in e and i merged as e.

/linɛl/

'to be'

/siɾɛl/

'to love'

/kɑɾdɑl/

'to read'

present participle

/siɾum/
/kɑɾdum/
/jɛs/ (I)
/ɛm/
/siɾɛm/
/kɑɾdɑm/
/du/ (you. sg)
/ɛs/
/siɾɛs/
/kɑɾdɑs/
/nɑ/ (he/she/it)
/ɛ/
/siɾi/
/kɑɾdɑ/
/mɛnkʰ/ (we)
/ɛnkʰ/
/siɾɛnkʰ/
/kɑɾdɑnkʰ/
/dukʰ/ (you.pl)
/ɛkʰ/
/siɾɛkʰ/
/kɑɾdɑkʰ/
/nɾɑnkʰ/ (they)
/ɛn/
/siɾɛn/
/kɑɾdɑn/

Eastern Armenian belongs to the -um branch of Armenian dialects, since the present indicative tense is formed by adding the auxiliary "to be" to the present participle form of the verb, which consists of the verb’s present stem and the suffix -um:

/jɛs kɑɾdum ɛm ɡiɾkʰə/ (I am reading the book)
/jɛs siɾum ɛm ɑjd ɡiɾkʰə/ (I love that book)

== See also ==
- Armenian language
- Armenian verbs
- Eastern Armenian verb table
- Western Armenian language
- Western Armenia
- Eastern Armenia
- Language families and languages
- IETF language tag:hy

== Bibliography ==
- Sakayan, Dora (2007). Eastern Armenian for the English-speaking World. A Contrastive Approach (with CD-ROM). Yerevan State University Press. ISBN 5808408903
