= Simonyan =

Simonyan (Armenian: Սիմոնյան) or in Western Armenian Simonian Western Armenian: Սիմոնեան), sometimes transliterated as Simonjan is an Armenian patronymic surname meaning "son of Simon". Notable people with the name include:

== People ==
=== Simonian ===
- Hovann Simonian, Armenian Swiss scholar in Armenian history
- Hrair Simonian (born 1991), Armenian chess grandmaster
- John Simonian (1935–2019), Kenyan field hockey player and rally driver
- Judith Simonian, American artist
- Karekin Simonian (1932–2019), Iraqi-born Armenian-Australian referee
- Nariné Simonian (born 1965, French-Armenian organist
- Sebu Simonian (born 1978), member of the American band duo Capital Cities
- Simon Simonian (1914–1986), Lebanese-Armenian intellectual, writer, activist and teacher, founder of the literary Armenian periodical Spurk

=== Simonyan ===
- Alen Simonyan (born 1980), Armenian politician, president of the National Assembly of Armenia
- Artem Simonyan (footballer) (born 1995), Armenian footballer
- Artyom Simonyan (born 1975), Armenian boxer
- Babken Simonyan (born 1952), Armenian-Serbian poet, essayist, translator, university professor and diplomat
- Gagik Simonyan (born 1971), Armenian footballer
- Hripsime Simonyan (1916–1998), Armenian artist and sculptor
- Karen Simonyan (born 1988), Armenian politician
- Margarita Simonyan (born 1980), Russian journalist, editor-in-chief of Russia Today
- Metaksia Simonyan (1926–1987), Soviet and Armenian stage and film actress
- Mikhail Simonyan (born 1986), Russian-American violinist
- Nadezhda Simonyan (1922–1997), Russian film composer
- Nikita Simonyan (1926–2025), Soviet and Russian footballer, coach, and sports official of Armenian descent
- Taron Simonyan (born 1987), Armenian lawyer, scientist and statesman
- Tata Simonyan (born 1962), Armenian singer

== See also ==
- Simonians, a 2nd-century Gnostic sect established by Simon Magus
- Simonyants
