= Danielyan =

Danielyan (Armenian: Դանիելյան), alternative transliterations Danieljan or Danielian, is an Armenian surname, derived from Daniel. Outside of Armenia, it's also prevalent in Russia.

Notable people with this surname include:

- Anushavan Danielyan (born 1956), Prime Minister of the Nagorno-Karabakh Republic
- Artur Danielian (born 2003), Russian figure skater
- Artur Daniyelyan (born 1998), Armenian footballer
- Ashot Danielyan (born 1974), Armenian weightlifter
- Elina Danielian (born 1978), Armenian chess player
- Elizabeth Danielyan (born 2003), Armenian singer
- Grigor Danielyan (born 1984), Armenian singer
- Hamazasp Danielyan (born 1984), Armenian political figure and current MP
- Haykanoush Danielyan (1893–1958), Armenian and Soviet opera singer and music educator
- Hovhannes Danielyan (born 1987), Armenian boxer
- Karine Danielyan (1947–2022), Armenian politician, biophysicist and opinion journalist
- Leon Danielian (1920–1997), American ballet dancer
- Nelly Danielyan (born 1978), Armenian painter
- Oganes Danielian (1974–2016), Armenian chess player
- Samvel Danielyan (born 1971), Armenian wrestler
- Vahe Danielyan (1920–?), Armenian soldier
