= Armenia–Serbia relations =

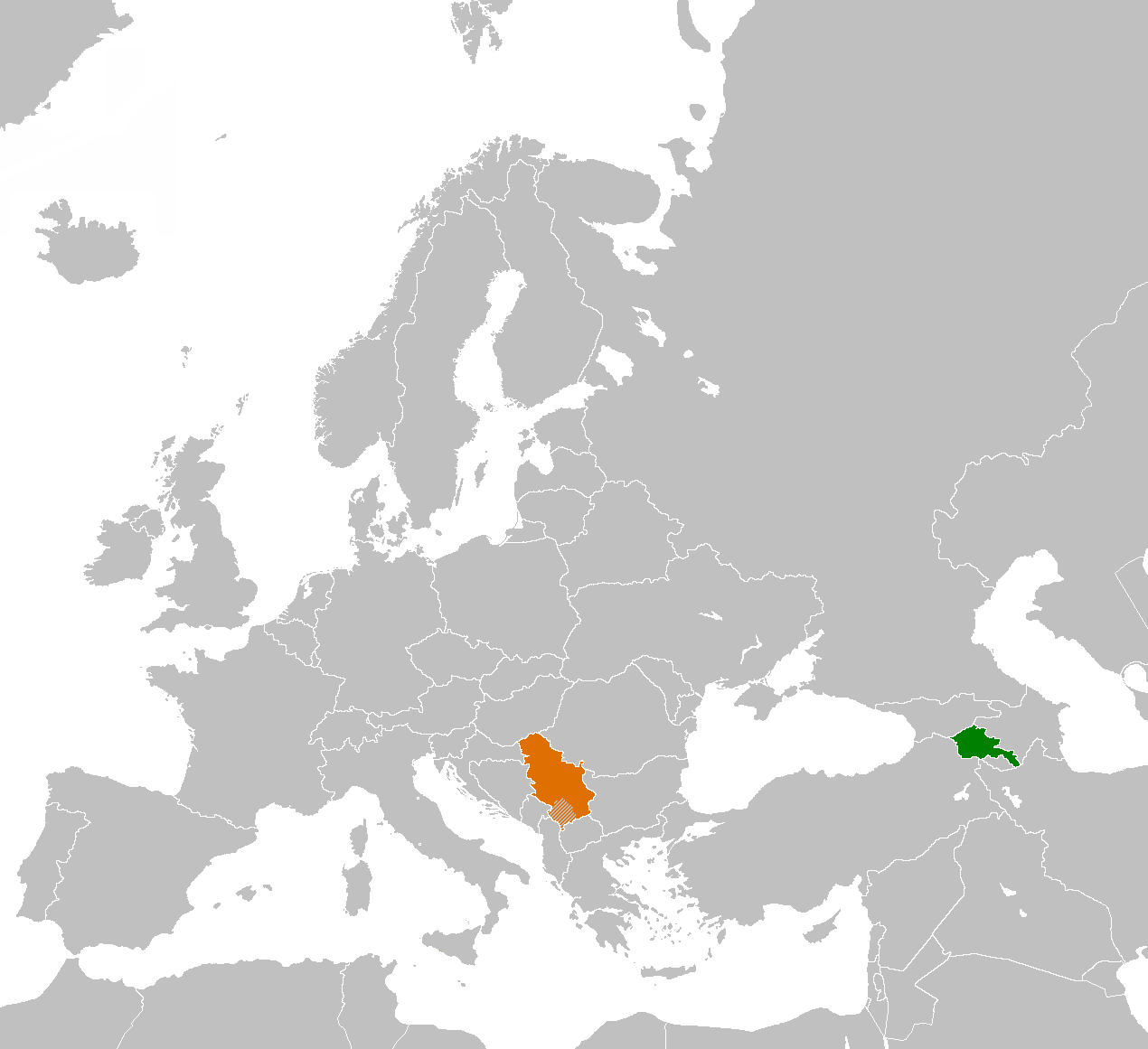

- Armenia: Serbia

Diplomatic mission
- Armenian embassy in Belgrade: Serbian embassy in Yerevan

Envoy
- Ashot Hovakimyan: Tatjana Panajotović Cvetković

Armenia and Serbia maintain diplomatic relations established between Armenia and the Federal Republic of Yugoslavia on 14 January 1993. Both countries are members of the United Nations, Council of Europe, Organization for Security and Co-operation in Europe, NATO's Partnership for Peace, the International Monetary Fund, and the International Bank for Reconstruction and Development.

== History ==
Saint Sava, a member of the medieval Nemanjić dynasty and founder of the Serbian Orthodox Church, visited a number of Armenian monasteries in the early 13th century. There he met with Armenian clergy and asked them to pray for certain Serbs whom he mentioned by name. Serbian writer Miloš Crnjanski wrote that Sava was impressed with the mastery of local builders and invited them to build churches in Serbia.

One of the earliest traces of Armenians in Serbia can be found at a monastery in the village of Vitovnica, near Petrovac. The monastery contains a marble slab with a bilingual inscription carved in both Church Slavonic and Armenian; the inscription dates back to 1218. It was written by an Armenian—Ladon, Son of Babug—who built a church that was probably located in the nearby village of Ranovac. According to legend, Armenian warriors in the service of the Ottoman Empire constructed the Jermenčić monastery (lit. "Little Armenian" monastery) near Sokobanja shortly after the Battle of Kosovo in 1389. It is said that they defected to the Serbs after discovering that they would be fighting their fellow Christians, fought against the Ottomans, retreated to the mountains around Sokobanja after the Serb defeat and built their monastery there. The monastery was razed several times by the Ottomans. Saint Gregory the Illuminator, the first official head of the Armenian Apostolic Church, was depicted in churches of medieval Serbia, and he is still venerated by the Serbian Orthodox Church.

The earliest works of 19th-century Serbian language reformer Vuk Stefanović Karadžić were published in Vienna by a printing house of Armenian Mechitarists. The Mechitarists also published the works of other Serb authors. In total, they printed 37 books and brochures, including The Mountain Wreath by Montenegrin Prince-Bishop Petar II Petrović-Njegoš. A khachkar (Armenian cross-stone), 3 metres (9.8 ft) high and made of volcanic rock, stands at the entrance of the Church of the Archangel Gabriel in the Belgrade municipality of Zemun. The monument was erected in 1993, and it commemorates the Serbian pilots who perished in a plane crash in 1988 while transporting humanitarian aid to Armenia after the country was struck by a catastrophic earthquake.

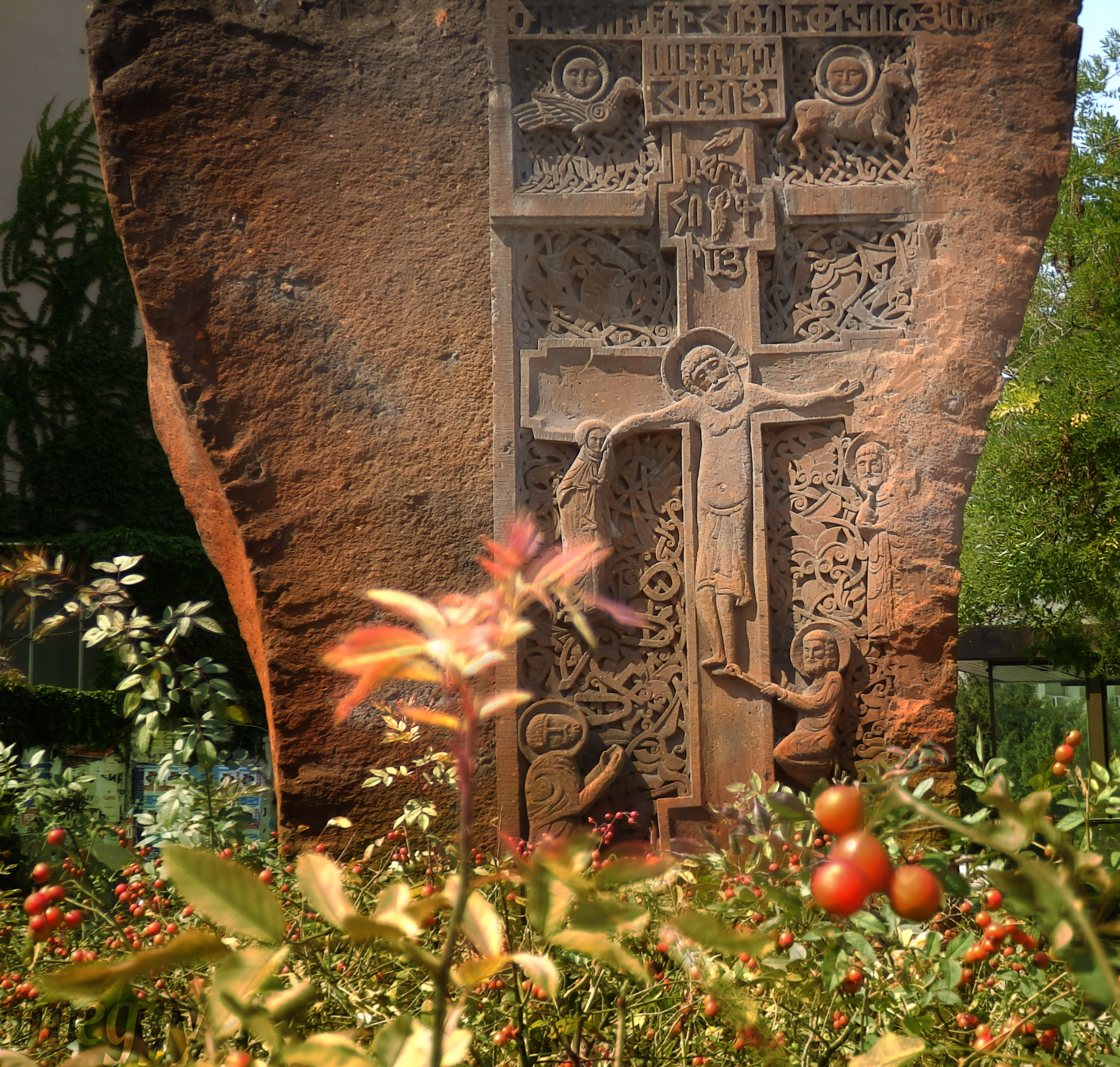
An Armenian khachkar in Novi Sad, Serbia

A colony of Armenian immigrants in Serbia existed in the 17th century. There was also the Armenian cemetery at the Belgrade Fortress overlooking the Danube river, which once was a border between the Austria-Hungary and the Ottoman Empire. After the Ottomans conquered Belgrade, they destroyed the city's Armenian and Jewish cemeteries. Today, only one Armenian tombstone remains, along with an inscription in Serbian which mentions the existence of an Armenian cemetery until the 17th century. A 1709 census shows that Armenians from Belgrade were wealthy and enjoyed a good standing in their community.

Another colony of Armenian immigrants was formed in the 20th century during and after the Armenian genocide. The persecuted Armenians settled in towns such as Belgrade, Vrnjačka Banja, Kruševac, Mladenovac, Zaječar, Negotin, Knjaževac, and Aleksinac. The number of Armenians that arrived in Serbia during this period remains unknown. In the mid-1930s, Armenians in Belgrade founded the Alliance of Armenians of Yugoslavia and established their headquarters in a building that came to be known as the Armenian House (Serbian: Јерменски дом), which was razed at the end of the 1990s. The third wave of Armenian immigrants arrived in the early 1990s. Nearly all of these were wives of Serbs who had come to Armenia looking for work after the 1988 earthquake. According to publicist and diplomat Babken Simonyan, there were around 200 Armenians living in Serbia according in 2011, three-quarters of whom lived in Belgrade. The rest of Armenian population can be found in Vrnjačka Banja and Novi Sad as well as in Valjevo. Most of Valjevo's Armenians immigrated to Serbia from the Kemah region, seeking employment. The community affairs of Valjevo's Armenians are run through the Armenka organization.

=== Armenian genocide ===
The Armenian genocide is studied and there has been a number of proposals over the genocide. However, Serbian Government has yet to recognize it due to significant investments from Turkey, and rejected a bill to recognize it, citing a pragmatic approach.

While Serbia is yet to recognize the Armenian genocide, many members of Serbian Government paid tribute to victims of Armenian genocide. Serbian President Tomislav Nikolić has urged to recognize the genocide. Recognition of Armenian genocide, unofficially, is often referred with a sense of exotic brotherhood, which Serbs consider Armenians as their brothers and sisters in one similar cause.

== Armenia's stance on Kosovo ==
Serbia (yellow) and Kosovo (striped)

The question of Kosovo's sovereignty is one of the most important political issues in Serbia. Armenia does not recognise Kosovo as an independent country, but its views on the dispute have largely been influenced by its interest in securing the independence of the Nagorno-Karabakh Republic from neighbouring Azerbaijan. While Baku stresses that the Nagorno-Karabakh is part of Azerbaijan, Armenia holds that the largely Armenian region should be independent in line with the principles of self-determination.

Former National Security Minister and chief Karabakh negotiator David Shahnazarian argued that even if Kosovo achieved its independence, it would not set a precedent for Nagorno-Karabakh because Armenia isn't democratic. He criticised the policy of the Western countries for "bypassing the norms they defended for 50 years", and said that Armenia's only possibility is nothing but to take this into account when formulating foreign policy. Armenia's former president, Serzh Sargsyan, has expressed that Armenia can not recognise Kosovo as long as it does not recognise the independence of the Republic of Artsakh, and that this is the only reason why Armenia would not recognise Kosovo's independence. In 2008, Sargsyan said that Armenia had always supported a people's right to self-determination and stated that Armenia welcomed Kosovo's independence. He called for serious discussions regarding Kosovo and said that Armenia's recognition of Kosovo wouldn't harm the relations between Armenia and Russia.

In 2010, Kosovo's Foreign Minister Skënder Hyseni met with Nalbandyan in New York City and asked for Armenia's recognition of Kosovo. At the meeting, Nalbandyan said that the principle of self-determination must not be subordinated to any other principle. He failed to announce Armenia's recognition for Kosovo, and only said that Armenia would maintain "useful" connections. The Armenian leadership has encountered great domestic opposition regarding their views on Kosovo. The largely pro-Serb Armenian population fears that by recognizing Kosovo, Armenia would be putting its strategic partnership with Russia at stake. During his visit to Serbia in 2011, Sargsyan said that Armenia would not change its attitude towards Kosovo and that it would never make any decision regarding Kosovo that was contrary to the interests of Serbia. In 2014, Nalbandyan stated that Armenia supports talks between Serbia and Kosovo so that a mutually acceptable solution could be found.

== Serbia's stance on Nagorno-Karabakh ==
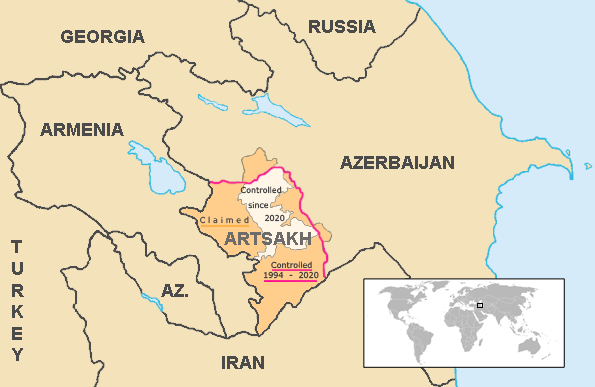
Territory formerly controlled by the Nagorno-Karabakh Republic. Formerly claimed by the Nagorno-Karabakh Republic, but then controlled by Azerbaijan; the entire territory is now under Azeri control

In 2008, Serbia was among the countries that voted in favour of Resolution 62/243 at the United Nations General Assembly. The resolution dealt with the status of Nagorno-Karabakh, reaffirmed "continued respect and support for the sovereignty and territorial integrity of Azerbaijan within its internationally recognized borders", demanded the "immediate, complete and unconditional withdrawal of all Armenian forces from all the occupied territories [of Azerbaijan]" and emphasized that "no state shall render aid or assistance" to maintain the occupation of Azerbaijani territories.

During a visit to Baku, then-president Boris Tadić said that Serbia supports Azerbaijan's territorial integrity and its position on the resolution of the Nagorno-Karabakh conflict. In 2014, Minister of Foreign Affairs Ivica Dačić told Nalbandyan that Serbia would support the OSCE Minsk Group and its work in order to "preserve peace and bring a political solution to the problem". On a visit to Baku two months later, Dačić stated that Serbia insists both on the peaceful resolution of the conflict and on the withdrawal of Armenian armed forces from Nagorno-Karabakh. For both, Armenia and Azerbaijan, the position of Serbia on the Nagorno-Karabakh issue is important as in 2015 Serbia chaired the OSCE, which guides negotiations on Karabakh via the Minsk Group process. In a 2014 interview, then-president Tomislav Nikolić said that during its chairmanship over the OSCE, Serbia will insist on Madrid principles and support efforts of the Minsk Group "with full respect for international law and territorial integrity".

== Economic relations ==
Trade between two countries amounted to $12 million in 2023; Armenian merchandise export to Serbia were about $0.5 million; Serbian exports were standing at $12 million. Armenia's export to Serbia includes scrap metals and mechanical equipment, while Serbia's export to Armenia includes mainly tobacco.

Armenia's membership in the Eurasian Customs Union (ECU) enabled free trade between Armenia and Serbia, as Serbia has made such agreement with the ECU.

The first Armenian-Serbian Business Forum was held in Yerevan in 2014, which was opened during the visit of Minister of Foreign Affairs of Serbia Ivan Mrkić.

In 2026, the Serbian government donated €1 million for the construction of a reservoir in the village of Hovnanadzor, Lori Province.

== High-level visits ==
Visits to Armenia			Visits to Serbia		
Date	Visitor	References	Date	Visitor	References
28–29 July 2009	Boris Tadić, President of Serbia		24 August 2001	Vartan Oskanian, Minister of Foreign Affairs of Armenia	
19 October 2010	Vuk Jeremić, Minister of Foreign Affairs of Serbia		19 April 2007	Vartan Oskanian, Minister of Foreign Affairs of Armenia	
10–11 March 2014	Ivan Mrkić, Minister of Foreign Affairs of Serbia		4–5 April 2011	Serzh Sargsyan, President of Armenia	
11–12 October 2014	Tomislav Nikolić, President of Serbia		2 October 2014	Eduard Nalbandyan, Minister of Foreign Affairs of Armenia	

== Bilateral treaties ==
Six agreements of mutual cooperation had been signed between the countries.

Agreement	Signatories	Date	Place
Joint Declaration	(Armenia) Vahan Papazyan, Minister of Foreign Affairs (Serbia and Montenegro) Vladislav Jovanović, Minister of Foreign Affairs	4 June 1995	Yerevan
Protocol between the Ministry of Foreign Affairs of the Republic of Armenia and the Federal Ministry for Foreign Affairs of the Federal Republic of Yugoslavia on Consultations and Cooperation	(Armenia) Vartan Oskanian, Minister of Foreign Affairs (Serbia and Montenegro) Goran Svilanović, Minister of Foreign Affairs	24 August 2001	Belgrade
Agreement between the Government of the Republic of Armenia and the Federal Government of the Federal Republic of Yugoslavia on Cooperation in the Fields of Education, Culture and Sport	(Armenia) Vartan Oskanian, Minister of Foreign Affairs (Serbia and Montenegro) Goran Svilanović, Minister of Foreign Affairs	24 August 2001	Belgrade
Action Plan between the Ministry of Culture of the Republic of Armenia and the Ministry of Culture of the Republic of Serbia on cooperation in 2011–2013	(Armenia) Serzh Sargsyan, President (Serbia) Boris Tadić, President	5 April 2011	Belgrade
Agreement between the Government of the Republic of Armenia and the Government of the Republic of Serbia on Air Service Cooperation	(Armenia) Serzh Sargsyan, President (Serbia) Boris Tadić, President	5 April 2011	Belgrade
Agreement between the Government of the Republic of Armenia and the Government of Republic of Serbia on the Abolition of Visa Requirements for the Holders of Diplomatic Passports	(Armenia) Serzh Sargsyan, President (Serbia) Boris Tadić, President	5 April 2011	Belgrade
Convention between the Government of the Republic of Armenia and the Government of the Republic of Serbia for the avoidance of double taxation with respect to taxes on income and on capital	(Armenia) Eduard Nalbandyan, Minister of Foreign Affairs (Serbia) Ivan Mrkić, Minister of Foreign Affairs	10 March 2014	Yerevan

== Resident diplomatic missions ==
- Armenia is accredited to Serbia through its embassy in Prague, Czech Republic and maintains an honorary consulate in Belgrade.
- Serbia has an embassy in Yerevan.

== See also ==
- Foreign relations of Armenia
- Foreign relations of Serbia
- Armenians in Serbia
