= List of members of the seventh National Assembly of Armenia =

The members of the 7th convocation of the National Assembly of Armenia were elected on 9 December 2018 and sworn in on 14 January 2019.

== Members of the National Assembly ==
Faction	Name	Party	Electoral district
My Step Alliance (82)	Lilit Makunts (head of faction)	Civil Contract	2 - Yerevan Districts Ajapnyak, Arabkir, Davtashen
My Step Alliance (82)	Hakob Simidyan (secretary of faction)	Civil Contract	4 - Yerevan Districts Kentron, Nork-Marash, Erebuni, Nubarashen
My Step Alliance (82)	Ararat Mirzoyan (Speaker of the Parliament)	Civil Contract	3 - Yerevan Districts Malatia-Sebastia, Shengavit
My Step Alliance (82)	Alen Simonyan (Vice-Speaker of the Parliament)	Civil Contract	4 - Yerevan Districts Kentron, Nork-Marash, Erebuni, Nubarashen
My Step Alliance (82)	Lena Nazaryan (Vice-Speaker of the Parliament)	Civil Contract	2 - Yerevan Districts Ajapnyak, Arabkir, Davtashen
My Step Alliance (82)	Gayane Abrahamyan	non-party	national electoral list
My Step Alliance (82)	Hovik Aghazaryan	Civil Contract	5 - Ararat
My Step Alliance (82)	Edgar Arakelyan	non-party	national electoral list
My Step Alliance (82)	Matevos Asatryan	Civil Contract	7 - Aragatsotn
My Step Alliance (82)	Sergey Atomyan	non-party	5 - Ararat
My Step Alliance (82)	Aleksandr Avetisyan	Civil Contract	national electoral list
My Step Alliance (82)	Sos Avetisyan	Civil Contract	national electoral list
My Step Alliance (82)	Lusine Badalyan	Civil Contract	national electoral list
My Step Alliance (82)	Nazeli Baghdasaryan	non-party	11 - Shirak
My Step Alliance (82)	Nikolay Baghdasaryan	Civil Contract	2 - Yerevan Districts Ajapnyak, Arabkir, Davtashen
My Step Alliance (82)	Rustam Bakoyan	Civil Contract	national electoral list (as a representative of national minority - Yazidis)
My Step Alliance (82)	Anush Beghloyan	Civil Contract	national electoral list
My Step Alliance (82)	Arman Boshyan	Civil Contract	national electoral list
My Step Alliance (82)	Hamazasp Danielyan	non-party	national electoral list
My Step Alliance (82)	Arpine Davoyan	Civil Contract	9 - Lori
My Step Alliance (82)	Artur Davtyan	Civil Contract	national electoral list
My Step Alliance (82)	Sisak Gabrielyan	Civil Contract	national electoral list
My Step Alliance (82)	Meri Galstyan	non-party	national electoral list
My Step Alliance (82)	Tatevik Gasparyan	non-party	5 - Ararat
My Step Alliance (82)	Hayk Gevorgyan	non-party	national electoral list
My Step Alliance (82)	Vahe Ghalumyan	Civil Contract	13 - Tavush
My Step Alliance (82)	Sona Ghazaryan	Civil Contract	national electoral list
My Step Alliance (82)	Taguhi Ghazaryan	Civil Contract	national electoral list
My Step Alliance (82)	Hripsime Grigoryan	Civil Contract	3 - Yerevan Districts Malatia-Sebastia, Shengavit
My Step Alliance (82)	Suren Grigoryan	Civil Contract	national electoral list
My Step Alliance (82)	Hrachya Hakobyan	Civil Contract	3 - Yerevan Districts Malatia-Sebastia, Shengavit
My Step Alliance (82)	Vagharshak Hakobyan	Civil Contract	10 - Kotayk
My Step Alliance (82)	Yerjanik Hakobyan	Civil Contract	1 - Yerevan Districts Avan, Nor Nork, Kanaker-Zeytun
My Step Alliance (82)	Karen Hambardzumyan	non-party	12 - Syunik and Vayots Dzor
My Step Alliance (82)	Knyaz Hasanov	non-party	national electoral list (as a representative of national minority - Kurds)
My Step Alliance (82)	Mkhitar Hayrapetyan	Civil Contract	1 - Yerevan Districts Avan, Nor Nork, Kanaker-Zeytun
My Step Alliance (82)	Tatevik Hayrapetyan	Civil Contract	national electoral list
My Step Alliance (82)	Vahagn Hovakimyan	Civil Contract	2 - Yerevan Districts Ajapnyak, Arabkir, Davtashen
My Step Alliance (82)	Hovhannes Hovhannisyan	Civil Contract	national electoral list
My Step Alliance (82)	Vahe Hovhannisyan	Mission	10 - Kotayk
My Step Alliance (82)	Hovhannes Igityan	non-party	national electoral list
My Step Alliance (82)	Arsen Julfalakyan	non-party	national electoral list
My Step Alliance (82)	Arousyak Julhakyan	Civil Contract	national electoral list
My Step Alliance (82)	Anna Karapetyan	Civil Contract	national electoral list
My Step Alliance (82)	Maria Karapetyan	Civil Contract	national electoral list
My Step Alliance (82)	Tigran Karapetyan	non-party	12 - Syunik and Vayots Dzor
My Step Alliance (82)	Varazdat Karapetyan	non-party	8 - Gegharkunik
My Step Alliance (82)	Narine Khachaturyan	non-party	national electoral list
My Step Alliance (82)	Aram Khachatryan	Civil Contract	9 - Lori
My Step Alliance (82)	Armen Khachatryan	Civil Contract	12 - Syunik and Vayots Dzor
My Step Alliance (82)	Sargis Khandanyan	Civil Contract	national electoral list
My Step Alliance (82)	Andranik Kocharyan	non-party	national electoral list
My Step Alliance (82)	Hayk Konjoryan	non-party	1 - Yerevan Districts Avan, Nor Nork, Kanaker-Zeytun
My Step Alliance (82)	Artak Manukyan	non-party	national electoral list
My Step Alliance (82)	Argishti Mekhakyan	non-party	6 - Armavir
My Step Alliance (82)	Sasun Mikayelyan	Civil Contract	10 - Kotayk
My Step Alliance (82)	Arsen Mikhaylov	non-party	national electoral list (as a representative of national minority - Assyrians)
My Step Alliance (82)	Aren Mkrtchyan	non-party	9 - Lori
My Step Alliance (82)	Koryun Mkrtchyan	Mission	national electoral list
My Step Alliance (82)	Narek Mkrtchyan	Civil Contract	6 - Armavir
My Step Alliance (82)	Sergey Movsissian	Civil Contract	7 - Aragatsotn
My Step Alliance (82)	Armen Pambukhchyan	Civil Contract	national electoral list
My Step Alliance (82)	Gevorg Papoyan	Civil Contract	3 - Yerevan Districts Malatia-Sebastia, Shengavit
My Step Alliance (82)	Sipan Pashinyan	Civil Contract	13 - Tavush
My Step Alliance (82)	Artashes Petrosyan	Mission	9 - Lori
My Step Alliance (82)	Kristine Poghosyan	Civil Contract	national electoral list
My Step Alliance (82)	Ruben Rubinyan	Civil Contract	national electoral list
My Step Alliance (82)	Aleksey Sandikov	non-party	national electoral list (as a representative of national minority - Russians)
My Step Alliance (82)	Hayk Sargsyan	Civil Contract	8 - Gegharkunik
My Step Alliance (82)	Karen Saroukhanyan	Civil Contract	11 - Shirak
My Step Alliance (82)	Yeghishe Soghomonyan	Mission	national electoral list
My Step Alliance (82)	Lilit Stepanyan	Civil Contract	10 - Kotayk
My Step Alliance (82)	Sedrak Tevonyan	non-party	5 - Ararat
My Step Alliance (82)	Vahagn Tevosyan	non-party	national electoral list
My Step Alliance (82)	Heriknaz Tigranyan	non-party	national electoral list
My Step Alliance (82)	Shirak Torosyan	Mighty Fatherland	national electoral list
My Step Alliance (82)	Babken Tunyan	non-party	national electoral list
My Step Alliance (82)	Tigran Ulikhanyan	Civil Contract	national electoral list
My Step Alliance (82)	Tsovinar Vardanyan	Civil Contract	national electoral list
My Step Alliance (82)	Vladimir Vardanyan	Civil Contract	national electoral list
My Step Alliance (82)	Arman Yeghoyan	Civil Contract	national electoral list
My Step Alliance (82)	Viktor Yengibaryan	non-party	6 - Armavir
My Step Alliance (82)	Narek Zeynalyan	Civil Contract	national electoral list
My Step Alliance (82)	Mikayel Zolyan	non-party	national electoral list
Prosperous Armenia (23)	Gagik Tsarukyan (head of faction)	Prosperous Armenia	national electoral list
Prosperous Armenia (23)	Arman Abovyan (secretary of faction)	Prosperous Armenia	national electoral list
Prosperous Armenia (23)	Vahe Enfiajyan (Vice-Speaker of the Parliament)	Prosperous Armenia	national electoral list
Prosperous Armenia (23)	Arayik Aghababyan	Prosperous Armenia	6 - Armavir
Prosperous Armenia (23)	Nora Arustamyan	Prosperous Armenia	7 - Aragatsotn
Prosperous Armenia (23)	Eduard Babayan	Prosperous Armenia	10 - Kotayk
Prosperous Armenia (23)	Artur Dallakyan	Prosperous Armenia	9 - Lori
Prosperous Armenia (23)	Kajik Gevorgyan	non-party	6 - Armavir
Prosperous Armenia (23)	Vardan Ghukasyan	non-party	11 - Shirak
Prosperous Armenia (23)	Artur Gregorian	Prosperous Armenia	national electoral list
Prosperous Armenia (23)	Vardevan Grigoryan	Prosperous Armenia	11 - Shirak
Prosperous Armenia (23)	Janibek Hayrapetyan	Prosperous Armenia	10 - Kotayk
Prosperous Armenia (23)	Shake Isayan	Prosperous Armenia	national electoral list
Prosperous Armenia (23)	Hrant Madatyan	Prosperous Armenia	8 - Gegharkunik
Prosperous Armenia (23)	Davit Manukyan	Prosperous Armenia	10 - Kotayk
Prosperous Armenia (23)	Mikayel Melkumyan	Prosperous Armenia	national electoral list
Prosperous Armenia (23)	Karine Poghosyan	Prosperous Armenia	national electoral list
Prosperous Armenia (23)	Soghomon Soghomonyan	Prosperous Armenia	national electoral list
Prosperous Armenia (23)	Tigran Stepanyan	Prosperous Armenia	5 - Ararat
Prosperous Armenia (23)	Iveta Tonoyan	Prosperous Armenia	national electoral list
Prosperous Armenia (23)	Artyom Tsarukyan	Prosperous Armenia	national electoral list
Prosperous Armenia (23)	Vardan Vardanyan	Prosperous Armenia	1 - Yerevan Districts Avan, Nor Nork, Kanaker-Zeytun
Prosperous Armenia (23)	Naira Zohrabyan	Prosperous Armenia	12 - Syunik and Vayots Dzor
Bright Armenia (17)	Edmon Marukyan (head of faction)	Bright Armenia	3 - Yerevan Districts Malatia-Sebastia, Shengavit
Bright Armenia (17)	Gevorg Gorgisyan (secretary of faction)	Bright Armenia	2 - Yerevan Districts Ajapnyak, Arabkir, Davtashen
Bright Armenia (17)	Sargis Aleksanyan	Bright Armenia	national electoral list
Bright Armenia (17)	Edward Andreasyan	Bright Armenia	6 - Armavir
Bright Armenia (17)	Hrant Ayvazyan	Bright Armenia	9 - Lori
Bright Armenia (17)	Harutyun Babayan	Bright Armenia	national electoral list
Bright Armenia (17)	Gurgen Baghdasaryan	non-party	1 - Yerevan Districts Avan, Nor Nork, Kanaker-Zeytun
Bright Armenia (17)	Srbuhi Grigoryan	Bright Armenia	national electoral list
Bright Armenia (17)	Arkadi Khachatryan	Bright Armenia	national electoral list
Bright Armenia (17)	Anna Kostanyan	Bright Armenia	national electoral list
Bright Armenia (17)	Sarik Minasyan	non-party	11 - Shirak
Bright Armenia (17)	Ani Samsonyan	Bright Armenia	national electoral list
Bright Armenia (17)	Karen Simonyan	Bright Armenia	national electoral list
Bright Armenia (17)	Taron Simonyan	non-party	9 - Lori
Bright Armenia (17)	Rubik Stepanyan	non-party	8 - Gegharkunik
Bright Armenia (17)	Mane Tandilyan	Bright Armenia	4 - Yerevan Districts Kentron, Nork-Marash, Erebuni, Nubarashen
Bright Armenia (17)	Armen Yeghiazaryan	Bright Armenia	national electoral list
Without faction (9)	Anna Grigoryan	non-party	elected from electoral list of My Step Alliance (12 - Syunik and Vayots Dzor)
Without faction (9)	Gor Gevorgyan	non-party	elected from national electoral list of My Step Alliance
Without faction (9)	Sofia Hovsepyan	non-party	elected from electoral list of My Step Alliance (11 - Shirak)
Without faction (9)	Taguhi Tovmasyan	non-party	elected from electoral list of My Step Alliance (8 - Gegharkunik)
Without faction (9)	Vardan Atabekyan	Civil Contract	elected from electoral list of My Step Alliance (4 - Yerevan Districts Kentron, Nork-Marash, Erebuni, Nubarashen)
Without faction (9)	Arman Babajanyan	non-party	elected from national electoral list of Bright Armenia
Without faction (9)	Gevorg Petrosyan	Prosperous Armenia	elected from national electoral list of Prosperous Armenia
Without faction (9)	Sergey Bagratyan	Prosperous Armenia	elected from national electoral list of Prosperous Armenia
Without faction (9)	Tigran Urikhanyan	Alliance Party	elected from national electoral list of Prosperous Armenia
Source: National Assembly of Armenia

=== Replacements ===
Date	Replacement	Faction	Replacing
30 January 2019	Vardan Atabekyan	My Step Alliance	Vahagn Grigorian

== See also ==
- Government of Armenia
- Politics of Armenia
- Second Pashinyan government
- 8th National Assembly of Armenia
