= Sarik Minasyan =

Armenian politician

- Սարիկ Մինասյան

Member of the National Assembly of Armenia
- Incumbent
- Assumed office 14 January 2019
- Parliamentary group: Bright Armenia
- Constituency: Shirak

Personal details
- Born: 16 August 1980 (age 45) Leninakan, Armenia SSR, Soviet Union

Sarik Minasyan (Armenian: Սարիկ Մինասյան; born 16 August 1980), is an Armenian politician, Member of the National Assembly of Armenia of Bright Armenia's faction.
