= Kostanyan =

Kostanyan (Armenian: Կոստանյան) is an Armenian surname. Notable people with the surname include:

- Anna Kostanyan (born 1987), Armenian politician
- Gayane Kostanyan (born 1988), Armenian football player
- Murad Kostanyan (1902–1989), Armenian actor
