= Gurgen Baghdasaryan =

Armenian politician

- Գուրգեն Բաղդասարյան

Member of the National Assembly of Armenia
- Incumbent
- Assumed office 14 January 2019
- Parliamentary group: Bright Armenia
- Constituency: Yerevan Districts Avan, Nor Nork, Kanaker-Zeytun

Personal details
- Born: 13 August 1977 (age 48) Yerevan, Armenia SSR, Soviet Union

Gurgen Baghdasaryan (Armenian: Գուրգեն Բաղդասարյան; born 13 August 1977), is an Armenian politician, Member of the National Assembly of Armenia of Bright Armenia's faction.
