= Edward Andreasyan =

Armenian politician

- Էդվարդ Անդրեասյան

Member of the National Assembly of Armenia
- Incumbent
- Assumed office 14 January 2019
- Parliamentary group: Bright Armenia
- Constituency: Armavir

Personal details
- Born: 21 April 1973 (age 52) Armavir, Armenia SSR, Soviet Union
- Party: Bright Armenia
- Children: 3

Edward Andreasyan (Armenian: Էդվարդ Անդրեասյան; born 21 April 1973), is an Armenian politician, Member of the National Assembly of Armenia of Bright Armenia's faction.
