= Armen Yeghiazaryan =

Armenian politician

- Արմեն Եղիազարյան
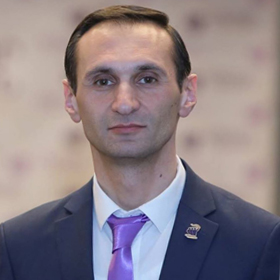

Member of the National Assembly of Armenia
- Incumbent
- Assumed office 14 January 2019
- Parliamentary group: Bright Armenia

Personal details
- Born: 1 June 1980 (age 45) Kirovakan, Armenia SSR, Soviet Union
- Party: Bright Armenia

Armen Yeghiazaryan (Armenian: Արմեն Եղիազարյան; born 1 June 1980), is an Armenian politician, Member of the National Assembly of Armenia of Bright Armenia's faction.
