= Hrant Ayvazyan =

Armenian politician (1969–2024)

- Հրանտ Այվազյան

Member of the National Assembly of Armenia
- In office 14 January 2019 – 6 February 2024
- Parliamentary group: Bright Armenia
- Constituency: Lori

Personal details
- Born: 14 September 1969 Yerevan, Armenian SSR, USSR
- Died: 6 February 2024 (aged 54) Aragatsotn Province, Armenia
- Party: Bright Armenia

Hrant Ayvazyan (Armenian: Հրանտ Այվազյան; 14 September 1969 – 6 February 2024) was an Armenian politician, Member of the National Assembly of Armenia of Bright Armenia's faction.

Ayvazyan died in a traffic collision on 6 February 2024, at the age of 54.

== Early life and education ==
Born in Vanadzor (formerly Kirovakan), Ayvazyan spent his early years in his hometown. He served in the armed forces of the USSR from 1988 to 1989. Following his military service, he pursued higher education at the Kirovakan branch of the Yerevan Polytechnic Institute, where he graduated in 1992 with a degree in Mechanical Engineering.

== Career ==
From 1997 to 2001, he taught at school No. 13 in Vanadzor, nurturing the next generation of learners. His expertise extended into several developmental projects; in 2003, he served as an expert-evaluator for the "NGO sector capacity assessment" project, and in 2006, as an expert for the "Strengthening of comprehensive waste management system in RA" project.

Between 2008 and 2019, Ayvazyan was the head of the security service at "Armobil" CJSC in Lori Marz. His academic contributions were also significant; since 2011, he had been a lecturer at the Vanadzor branch of the National Polytechnic University of Armenia.

=== Political Involvement ===
Ayvazyan's political career was marked by his commitment to local and national governance. He was a member of the Vanadzor Council of Elders from 2016 to 2019, and chaired the "Lori Development Center" from 2003 to 2019. His other roles included memberships on various councils and commissions such as the Social Assistance Council attached to the Vanadzor Social Assistance Territorial Department (2008-2014), the Lori Marz Employment Support Marz Commission (2016-2018), and the Public Council attached to the RA Minister of Territorial Administration and Development (2018).

On December 9, 2018, Ayvazyan was elected to the National Assembly on the territorial electoral list for the "Bright Armenia" party's electoral district No. 9, where he served until his untimely death.

== Death ==
Ayvazyan died in a traffic collision on 6 February 2024, at the age of 54. His car collided with another in an icy road in Aragatsotn region. he died on the spot and another person was injured.
