= Rubik Stepanyan =

Armenian politician

- Ռուբիկ Ստեփանյան

Member of the National Assembly of Armenia
- Incumbent
- Assumed office 14 January 2019
- Parliamentary group: Bright Armenia
- Constituency: Gegharkunik

Personal details
- Born: 3 January 1958 (age 68) Artsvanist, Armenia SSR, Soviet Union

Rubik Stepanyan (Armenian: Ռուբիկ Ստեփանյան; born 3 January 1958), is an Armenian politician, Member of the National Assembly of Armenia of Bright Armenia's faction.
