= Arkadi Khachatryan =

Armenian politician

- Արկադի Խաչատրյան
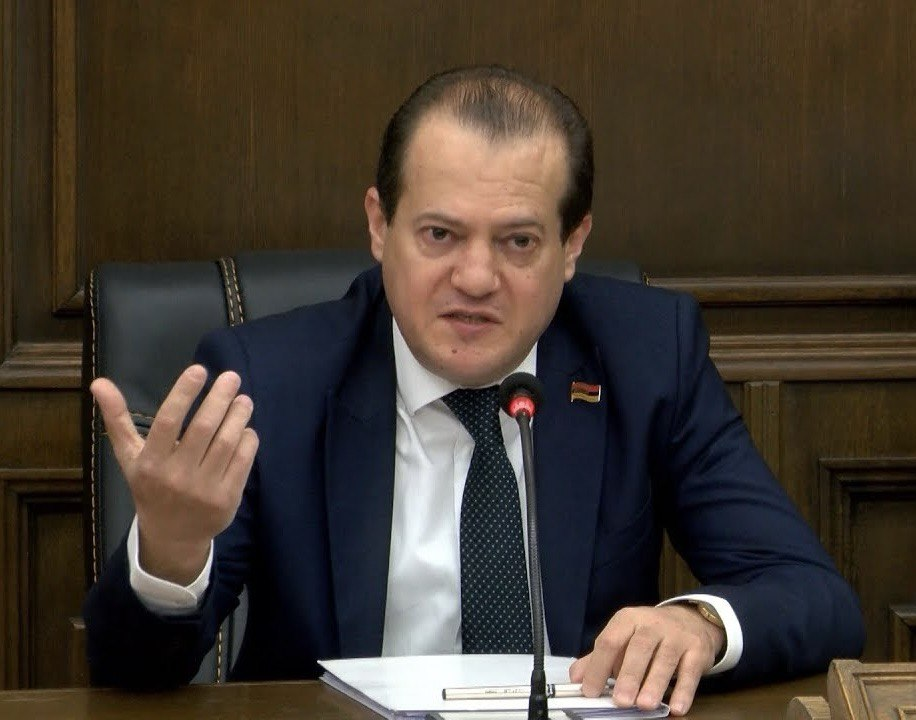

Member of the National Assembly of Armenia
- Incumbent
- Assumed office 14 January 2019

Personal details
- Born: 29 January 1975 (age 51) Yerevan, Armenia SSR, Soviet Union
- Party: Non-party

Arkadi Khachatryan (Armenian: Արկադի Խաչատրյան; born 29 January 1975), is an Armenian politician, Member of the National Assembly of Armenia of Bright Armenia's faction.
