= Vagharshak =

Vagharshak (in Western Armenian Vagharshag) (in Armenian Վաղարշակ) is an Armenian masculine given name. It may refer to:

- Vagharshak Hakobyan (born 1991), Armenian politician and Turkologist
- Vagharshak Harutiunyan (born 1956), Armenian politician and minister
- Vagharshak Kosyan, Armenian-Abkhazian military leader and politician
- Vagarshak Ter-Vaganyan (1893–1936), Soviet Armenian communist and journalist

== See also ==
- Arshak III (fl. 4th century – died 387), also known as Arshak III-Vagharshak, Arsaces III, Arsak III, Armenian prince who served as the Roman client king of Arsacid Armenia from 378 until 387.
