= Matevos Asatryan =

Armenian politician (1985–2023)

- Մաթևոս Ասատրյան
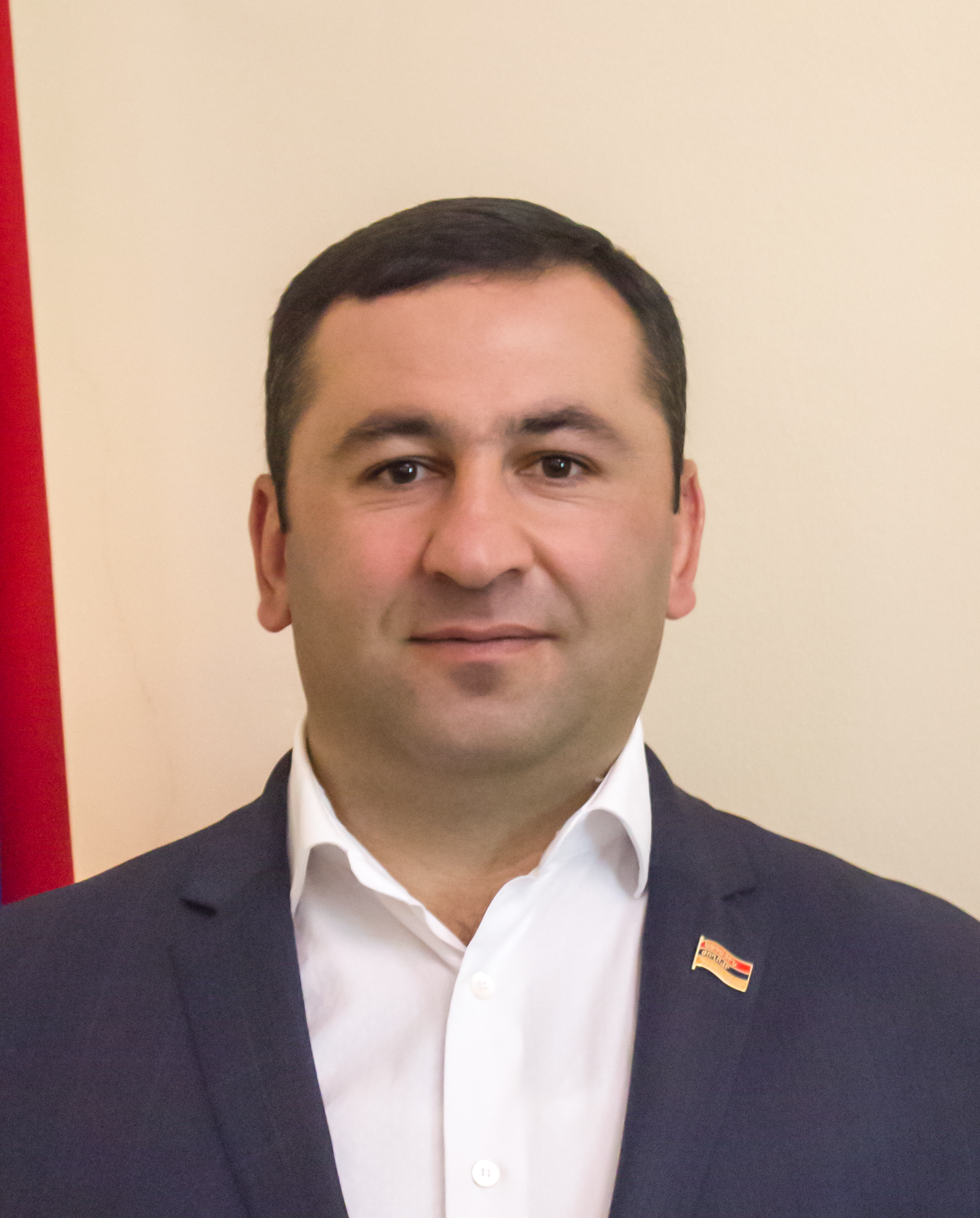

Member of National Assembly
- In office 14 January 2019 – 6 November 2023

Personal details
- Born: Andranik Noriki Tevanyan; 2 December 1985 Kuchak, Armenian SSR, USSR
- Died: 6 November 2023 (aged 37)
- Party: Civil Contract

Matevos Asatryan (Armenian: Մաթևոս Ասատրյան; 2 December 1985 – 6 November 2023) was an Armenian politician who served as a member of the National Assembly from 2019 until his death in 2023. He was a member of Civil Contract and, in the National Assembly, the Standing Committee on Territorial Administration, Local Self-Government, Agriculture and Environment.

== Biography ==
Matevos Asatryan was born in 1985 in Kuchak village of Aparan region of Soviet Armenia. From 2003 to 2005, he served in the Armed Forces of Armenia. In 2008, he graduated from the Faculty of Law of the Northern University of Yerevan. From 2012 to 14 January 2019, he managed the Kuchaki Mihrdat Asatryan Children's and Youth Sports School. In 2014 and 2017, he trained in the European teams "Lud Club de Nice", "Kavi Gal" and other sports schools.

== Political career ==
In the 2018 parliamentary election, Asatryan was elected a deputy of the 7th convocation of the National Assembly, representing My Step Alliance in constituency No. 7. He was a member of the "Permanent Committee on Territorial Management, Local Self-Government, Agriculture and Environmental Protection" in the National Assembly. In the 2021 election, he was elected a deputy of the 8th convocation of the National Assembly, this time representing Civil Contract.

=== Political reprisals by relatives ===
On 19 June 2022, around 7:40 p.m., in Nigavan, relatives and friends of Asatryan, the cousin of Aragatsotn deputy governor Edgar Parvanyan, opened fire on a group of young people with Kalashnikov assault rifles. This resulted in seven young people being taken to the hospital with gunshot wounds. According to some information, the brother of Matevos Asatryan, the head of the Aparan water use company, Grzo Asatryan, also personally participated in the incident. Some time after the incident, the number of those killed reached two. According to information circulating in the media, the reason for the attack with assault rifles was that the youth cursed Armenian Prime Minister Nikol Pashinyan during an argument.

A few hours after the incident, the Armenian police issued a statement stating that the incident had no political context and that a shot was fired from a hunting rifle. Asatryan also referred to the incident on his Facebook page.

== Personal life and death ==
Asatryan, who was married with three children, died suddenly on 6 November 2023. He was 38.
