= Sargis Aleksanyan =

Armenian politician

- Սարգիս Ալեքսանյան

Member of the National Assembly of Armenia
- Incumbent
- Assumed office 14 January 2019
- Parliamentary group: Bright Armenia

Personal details
- Born: 30 November 1983 (age 42) Yerevan, Armenia SSR, Soviet Union
- Party: Bright Armenia

Sargis Aleksanyan (Armenian: Սարգիս Ալեքսանյան; born 30 November 1983), is an Armenian politician, Member of the National Assembly of Armenia of Bright Armenia's faction.
