= Srbuhi =

Srbuhi or Srpouhi (in Western Armenian) is an Armenian given name meaning female saint, also denoting being saintly, pure, clean (from the Armenian word surb or in Western Armenian sourp).

Srbuhi may refer to:

- Srbuhi Grigoryan (born 1974), Armenian politician, Member of the National Assembly of Armenia
- Srbuhi Sargsyan (born 1994), Armenian singer better known by the mononym Srbuk
- Srpouhi Dussap (1840–1901), Armenian feminist writer and the first female Armenian novelist
