= Harutyun Babayan =

Armenian politician

- Հարություն Բաբայան
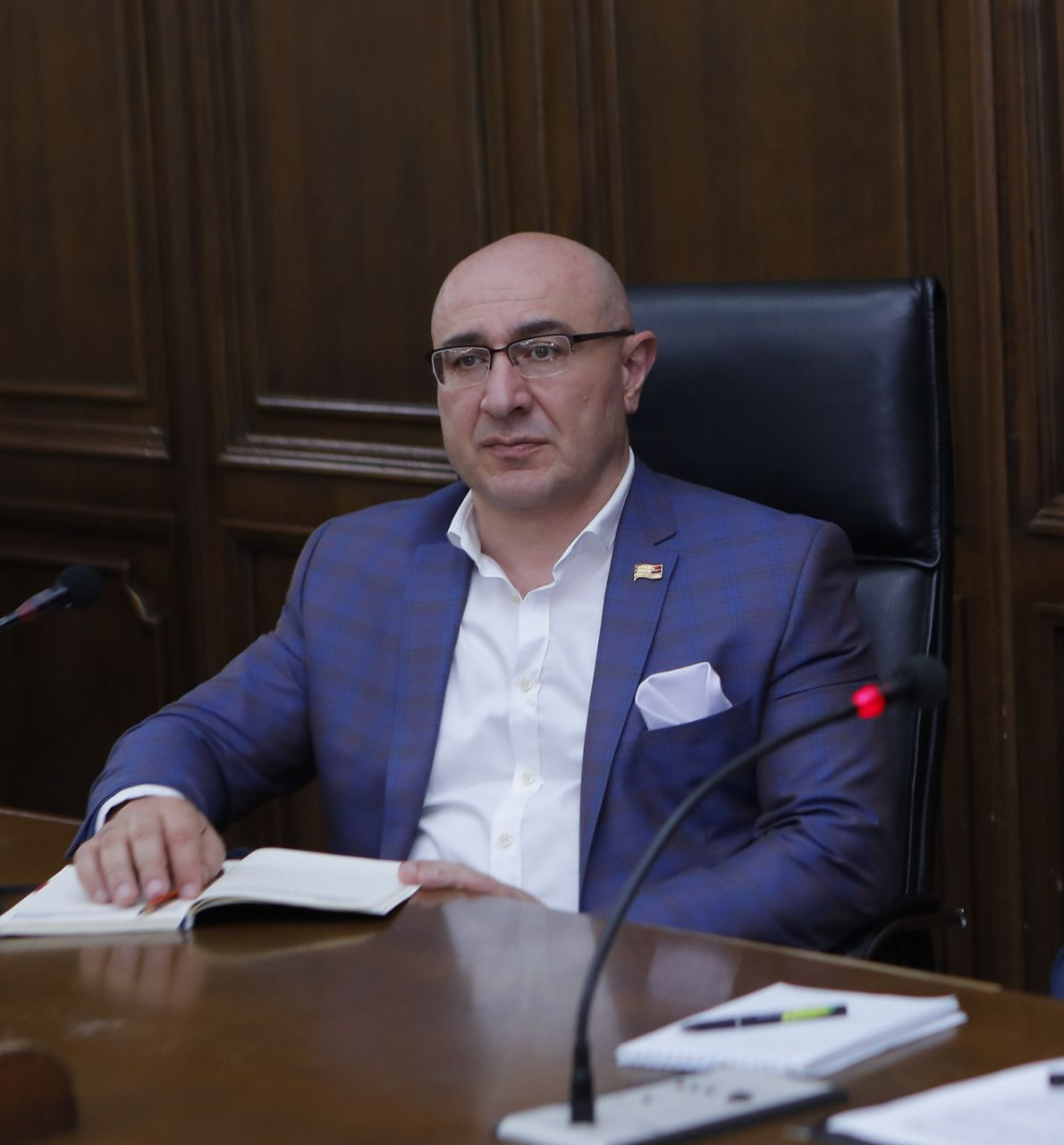

Member of the National Assembly of Armenia
- Incumbent
- Assumed office 14 January 2019
- Parliamentary group: Bright Armenia

Member of the Yerevan City Council
- In office 2017–2018

Personal details
- Born: 18 December 1975 (age 50) Yerevan, Armenia SSR, Soviet Union
- Party: Bright Armenia
- Children: 2

Harutyun Babayan (Armenian: Հարություն Բաբայան; born 18 December 1975), is an Armenian politician, Member of the National Assembly of Armenia of Bright Armenia's faction and former member of the Yerevan City Council.
