= Armenians in Serbia =

Ethnic group

Јермени у Србији Հայերը Սերբիայում

Total population
- 221 (2022)

Regions with significant populations
- Belgrade, Novi Sad

Languages
- Armenian and Serbian

Religion
- Oriental Orthodoxy

Related ethnic groups
- Armenian diaspora

Armenians in Serbia refers to ethnic Armenians living in Serbia. According to data from the 2022 census, there were 221 ethnic Armenians living in Serbia.

== History ==
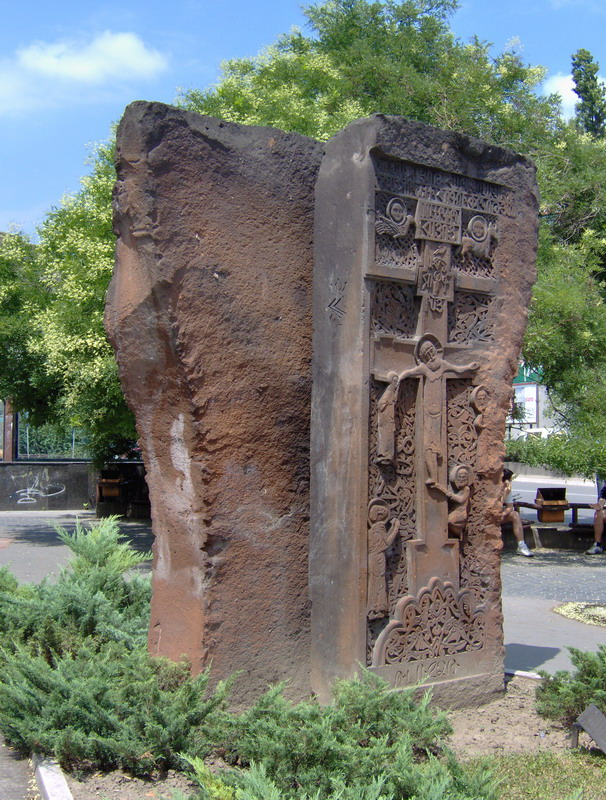
Khachkar in Novi Sad, which stands at the site where there was once an Armenian church

Armenians were recorded in Serbia in 1218 when Saint Sava invited constructors to build a Serbian Orthodox monastery after he had been to Armenia and seen the Armenian architecture there. The Armenians were to build Vitovnica Monastery, which has preserved a bilingual sacral text in Serbian and Armenian dating to the building.

Armenians were a small part of the Ottoman Turkish army when they invaded Serbia prior to the Battle of Kosovo 1389. However upon hearing that they would attack a Christian people, they fled the Ottomans to the other side to fight alongside the Serbs. After the battle, the surviving Armenians settled in the hills of Sokobanja where they built Jermenčić Monastery.

Evliya Celebi registers an Armenian "district" of Užice in the 17th century.

In 1718, during Habsburg rule, there were 29 Armenian families living within the city walls of Belgrade.

Remains of an Armenian graveyard lie in Kalemegdan fortress, which was last used in the 17th century after the Ottomans destroyed it. Only a few tombs are left in good condition. In 1810, the Turks destroyed the Celije Monastery, and the Serbs rebuilt it in 1811 with the help of wealthy Armenians. One of the benefactors had his idea of an Armenian style dome included in the work, so the monastery today can be considered an outcome of Byzantine/Serbian-Armenian architecture.

In 1880s, merchants from the Gamakh region in Armenia settled in Valjevo (Tehlirians). Among the Tehlirians was Soghomon Tehlirian's father. During the Second World War, many Armenians moved to North America and France.

In the past, there used to be an Armenian Catholic church in Novi Sad (built in 1746, razed in 1963).

Some 500 female Serbian descendants of Armenians married Serbs in the 1990s.

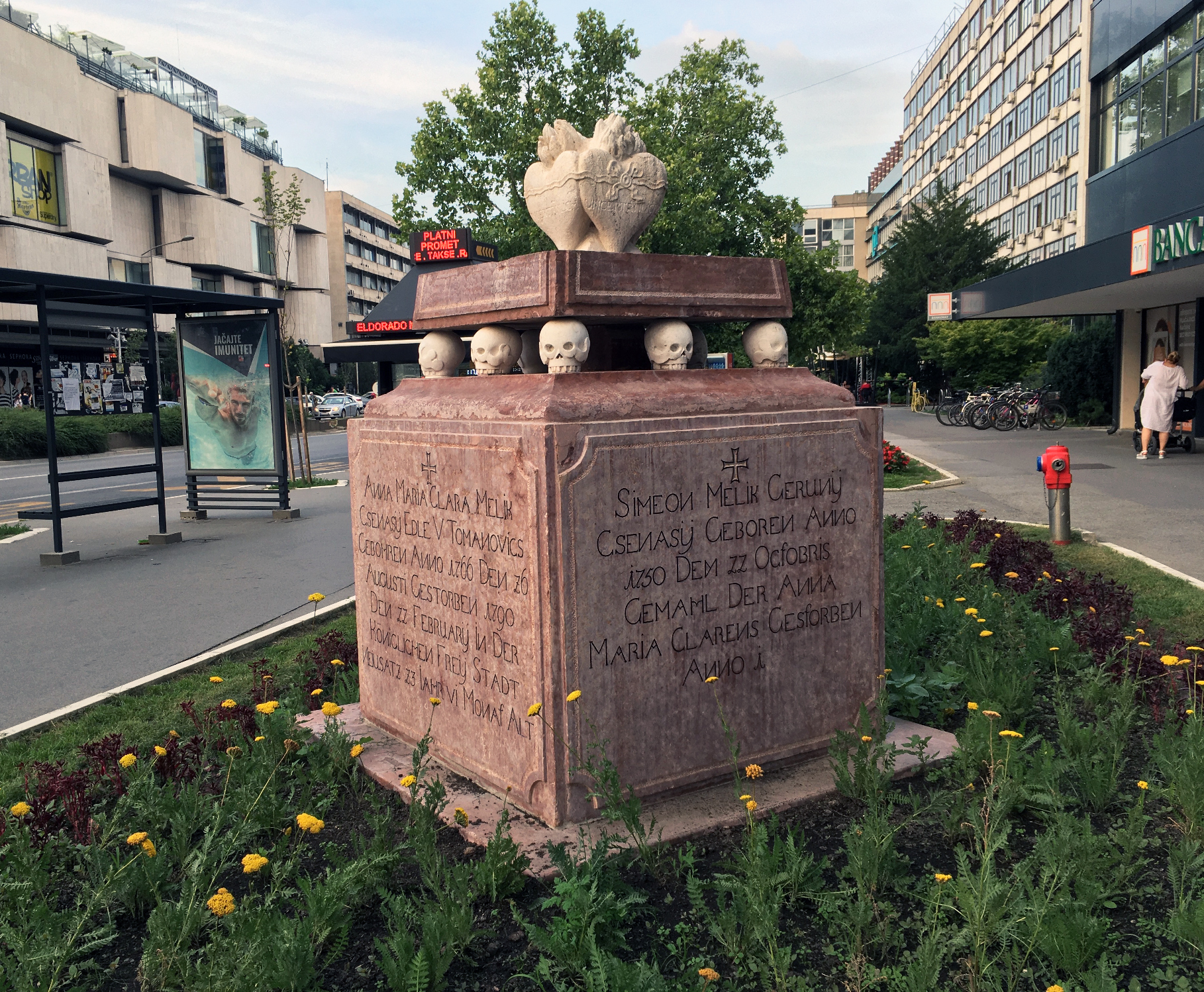
Monument of Armenian family Černazi in Novi Sad

Armenia and Serbia established diplomatic relations in 1992. Armenia is represented in Serbia through its embassy in Athens, Greece. Serbia is also represented in Armenia through its embassy in Athens. The "Armenka" association of ethnic Armenians in Serbia which holds community affairs is led by Gohar Harutyunyan-Sekulic.

In 2009, Boris Tadic paid a visit to Armenia, becoming the first Serbian head of state to visit Armenia. The presidents of both countries express intentions to improve the spiritual, cultural, and economic relations between the two countries stressing that the centuries-long friendship between the peoples was a good basis for boosting their bilateral relations. Armenia has not recognized the unilateral declaration of independence of Kosovo.

Serbian president, Tomislav Nikolić, was one of the heads of state to visit Yerevan on the occasion of the 100th anniversary of the Armenian genocide.

Armenian president, Armen Sarkissian, visited Serbia in October 2019 to discuss ways in which the two countries can increase ties.

== See also ==
- Armenian diaspora
- Armenia–Serbia relations
