= Karen Simonyan =

Armenian politician

- Կարեն Սիմոնյան
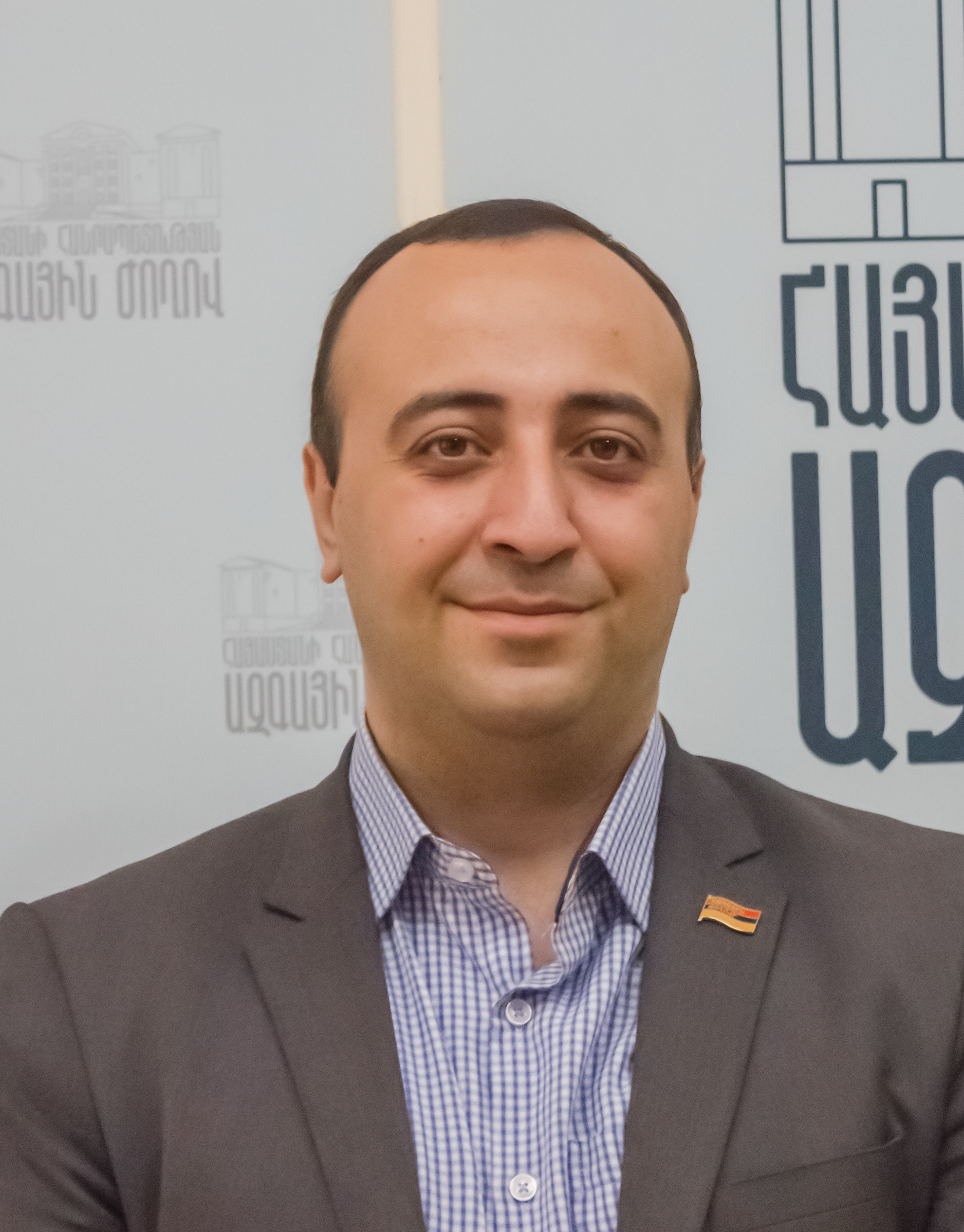

Member of the National Assembly of Armenia
- Incumbent
- Assumed office 14 January 2019
- Parliamentary group: Bright Armenia

Personal details
- Born: 3 October 1988 (age 37) Kirovakan, Armenia SSR, Soviet Union
- Party: Bright Armenia

Karen Simonyan (Armenian: Կարեն Սիմոնյան; born 3 October 1988), is an Armenian politician, Member of the National Assembly of Armenia of Bright Armenia's faction.
