= Ani Samsonyan =

Armenian politician

- Անի Սամսոնյան
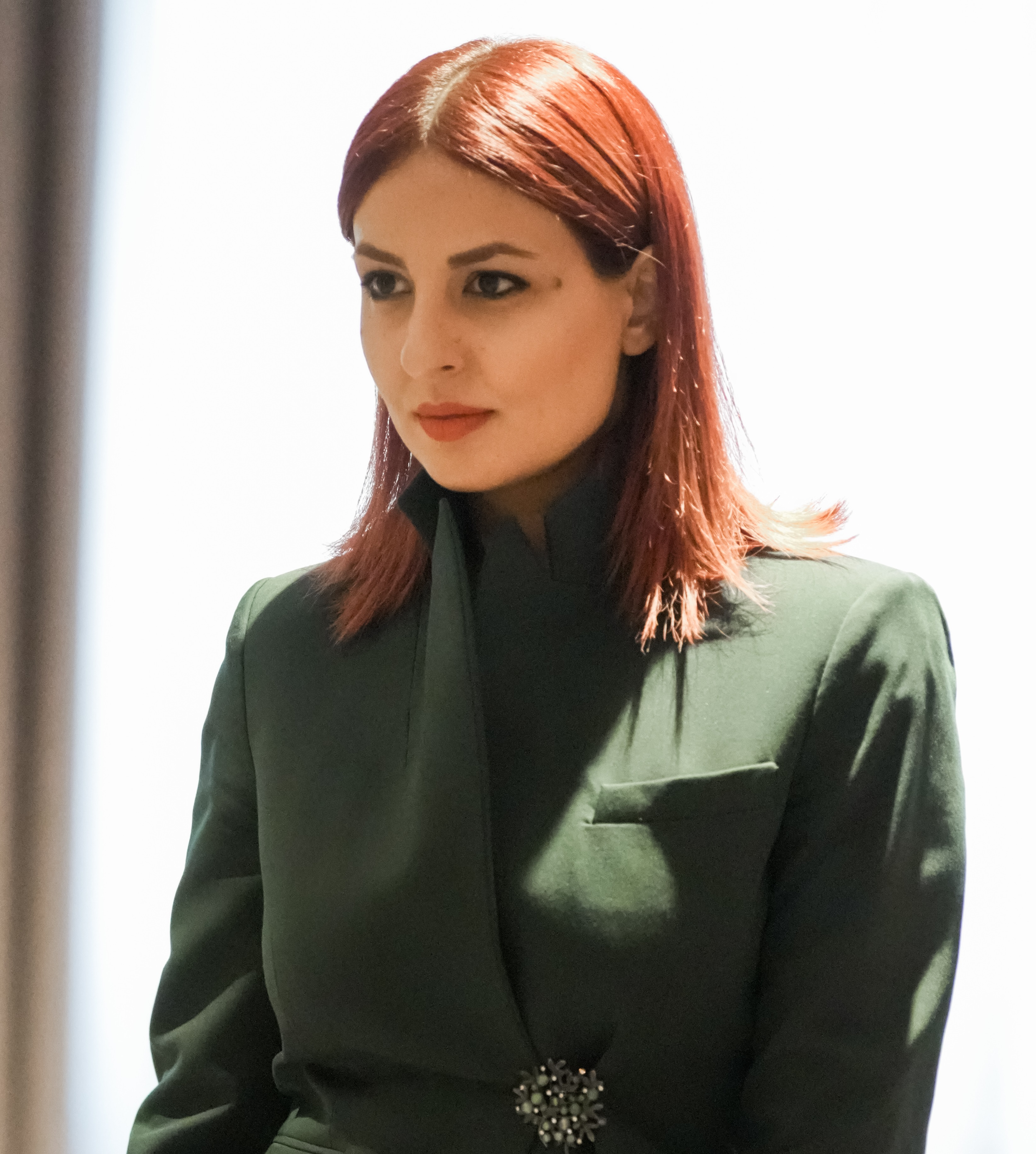

Member of the National Assembly of Armenia
- Incumbent
- Assumed office 14 January 2019
- Parliamentary group: Bright Armenia

Member of the Yerevan City Council
- In office 2018–2019

Personal details
- Born: February 10, 1990 (age 36) Yerevan, Armenian SSR, Soviet Union
- Party: Bright Armenia
- Education: Armenian State Pedagogical University, National Academy of Sciences, Public Administration Academy of the RA

Ani Tachati Samsonyan (Armenian: Անի Տաճատի Սամսոնյան; born in Yerevan, then part of the Armenian SSR in 1990, February 10), is an Armenian politician and journalist, member of the National Assembly since was elected in 2018 election for Bright Armenia, assuming the office on 14 January 2019. She is the deputy chair of the Standing Committee on the Protection of Human Rights and Public Affairs.

She is also a member of Inter parliamentary Committee on cooperation between the National Assembly of Armenia and National Assembly of the Republic of Belarus. She has a membership in Parliamentary Assembly of the Organization for Security and Co-operation in Europe (PA OSCE). She is also engaged in a range of Friendship Groups of the National Assembly of Armenia including Friendship Group Armenia-Austria, Friendship Group Armenia-Japan, Friendship Group Armenia - Latvia, Lithuania, Estonia, Friendship Group Armenia-Moldova, Friendship Group Armenia-Slovenia.

== Education ==
She got a degree in Journalism from the Armenian State Pedagogical University in 2011.

Between 2011 and 2013, she studied in the Department of International Relations at the International Center for Science and Education of the Armenian National Academy of Sciences.

Currently, she is taking a Master’s Degree program of the Law Department of Public Administration Academy of Armenia.

== Career ==
In 2010–2012, she was a Scientific Associate at the H. Sharambeyan Center for Folk Art. In 2012–2013, she was a journalist of "ArmNews" media TV company. In 2012–2013, she was the author of the articles of the analytical website "Diplomat.am" (a series of articles, called "Information Wars and Campaign"). In 2013–2014, she was the Coordinator of the "ArmNews" press club. In 2015, she was a founding member of the "Bright Armenia" initiative, then the "Bright Armenia" party, press secretary of the party. In 2017–2018, she became the Deputy Chair of the Standing Committee of the Municipal Council of Yerevan on issues of urban planning and land use. Member of the "Way Out" faction.

As a result of the extraordinary election to the Yerevan City Council held on 23 September 2018, she was elected a member of the Council. In 2018–2019, she was a member of the Standing Committee of the Municipal Council of Yerevan on issues of urban planning and land use. Member of the "Luys" faction. On December 9, 2018, she became an elected Member of the National Assembly from the national electoral list of the "Bright Armenia" party.
