= Gevorg Gorgisyan =

Armenian politician

- Գևորգ Գորգիսյան

Member of the National Assembly of Armenia
- Incumbent
- Assumed office 14 January 2019
- Parliamentary group: Bright Armenia
- Constituency: Yerevan Districts Ajapnyak, Arabkir, Davtashen
- In office 18 May 2017 – 14 January 2019
- Parliamentary group: Way Out Alliance
- Constituency: Yerevan Districts Ajapnyak, Arabkir, Davtashen

Personal details
- Born: 23 January 1986 (age 40) Yerevan, Armenia SSR, Soviet Union
- Party: Bright Armenia
- Children: 3

Gevorg Gorgisyan (Armenian: Գևորգ Գորգիսյան; born 23 January 1986), is an Armenian politician, Member of the National Assembly of Armenia and the secretary of Bright Armenia faction.

== Biography ==
In 2007-2009 Gorgisyan served in the Armed Forces of the Republic of Armenia. In 2003 he entered the Computer Systems and Computer Science Department of the Armenian State Engineering University. In 2011 Gevorg graduated with a master's degree from the “Synopsys Armenia” Educational Department, receiving specialty of Automation of Electronic Design.

From February 1, 2007, to January 12, 2015, Gorigisyan worked in the number of IT companies: namely Armproject, “Stream Tech” LLC, NairiSoft, Altakod, IAM Cloud.

In 2013-2014 he was member of the coordinating group of the “I am against” initiative. After that he become member of the coordinating group of the “Bright Armenia” initiative.

In 2015 was elected as a member of the council of the Bright Armenia party.

From 2017 to 2019 Gorgisyan was member of the National Assembly (electoral district #2 of the alliance of parties “Way Out”). In the period of May 24.2017 - September 19. 2018 - Member of the Standing Committee on European Integration of the National Assembly.

On December 9, 2018, Gevorg Gorgisyan was elected as Member of the National Assembly of Armenia from the territorial electoral list of the electoral district #2 of the Bright Armenia party.
