= Tigran Ulikhanyan =

Armenian politician (born 1983)

Tigran Ulikhanyan (December 18, 1983, Kirovakan, Armenian Soviet Socialist Republic, USSR) was a member of the National Assembly of Armenia from January 2019 until June 2020. On February 2, 2019, he was appointed to the NA Standing Committee on Financial-Credit and Budgetary Affairs.

== Biography ==
Tigran Ulikhanyan was born in Vanadzor, Soviet Armenia, on December 18, 1983.

From 2003 to 2005, he served in the Armed Forces of the Republic of Armenia.

Until 2008, Ulikhanyan studied at the Department of Management, Armenian State University of Economics (ASUE), obtaining the qualification of an Economist Manager.

From 2008 to 2011 Ulikhanyan was the director of Resonance and Radio Communication, a limited liability company (LLC) based in Yerevan. Between 2014 and 2016, he worked as a researcher and later also a surveillance division specialist at the universal credit organization (UCO) FINCA Later, from 2016 until 2018, he was the director of Atica Shin, a limited liability company specializing in development. From May 2018 until January 2019, Ulikhanyan served as a deputy director of the State Supervision Service.

A member of the seventh convocation of the National Assembly between 2019 and 2020, Ulikhanyan served as a member of the Standing Committee on Financial-Credit and Budgetary Affairs.

A deputy chief of the State Supervision Service from 2020 onwards, he later took over for the agency's chief.

On January 15, 2021, Ulikhanyan was appointed as the chief of the State Supervision Service.

== Political activity ==
Since 2015, Ulikhanyan has been a founding member of the Civil Contract party .

On December 9, 2018, he was elected to the National Assembly as a representative of My Step Alliance.

== Family ==
Tigran Ulikhanyan is married and has five children.
