= Anna Kostanyan =

Armenian politician

- Աննա Կոստանյան
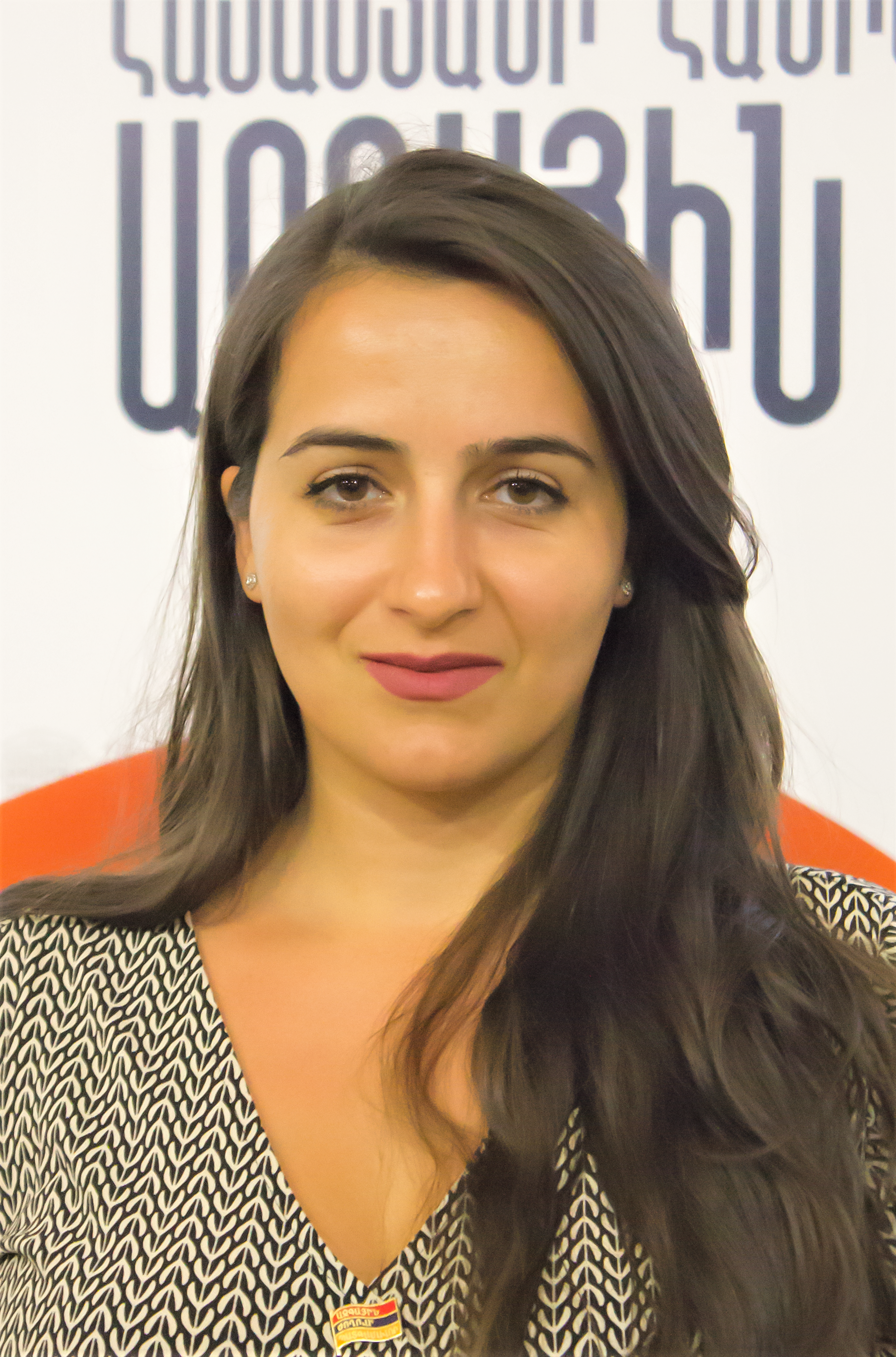

Member of the National Assembly of Armenia
- Incumbent
- Assumed office 14 January 2019
- Parliamentary group: Bright Armenia

Personal details
- Born: 17 January 1987 (age 39) Yerevan, Armenia SSR, Soviet Union
- Party: Bright Armenia

Anna Mayis Kostanyan (Armenian: Աննա Մայիսի Կոստանյան; born 17 January 1987), is an Armenian politician, Member of the National Assembly of Armenia of Bright Armenia's faction.
