= Simonyants =

Simonyants or (Arabic: Սիմոնյանց) is an Armenian surname. Notable people with the surname include:

- Eduard Simonyants (1937–2005), Armenian political and military figure, major general
- Liparit Siminyants (1915–1999) Soviet Armenian applied scientist in the area of oil industry
- Sergey Simonyants (born 1950), Soviet and Russian applied scientist in the area of oil industry

== See also ==
- Simonyan
