= Taron Simonyan =

Armenian politician

- Տարոն Սիմոնյան
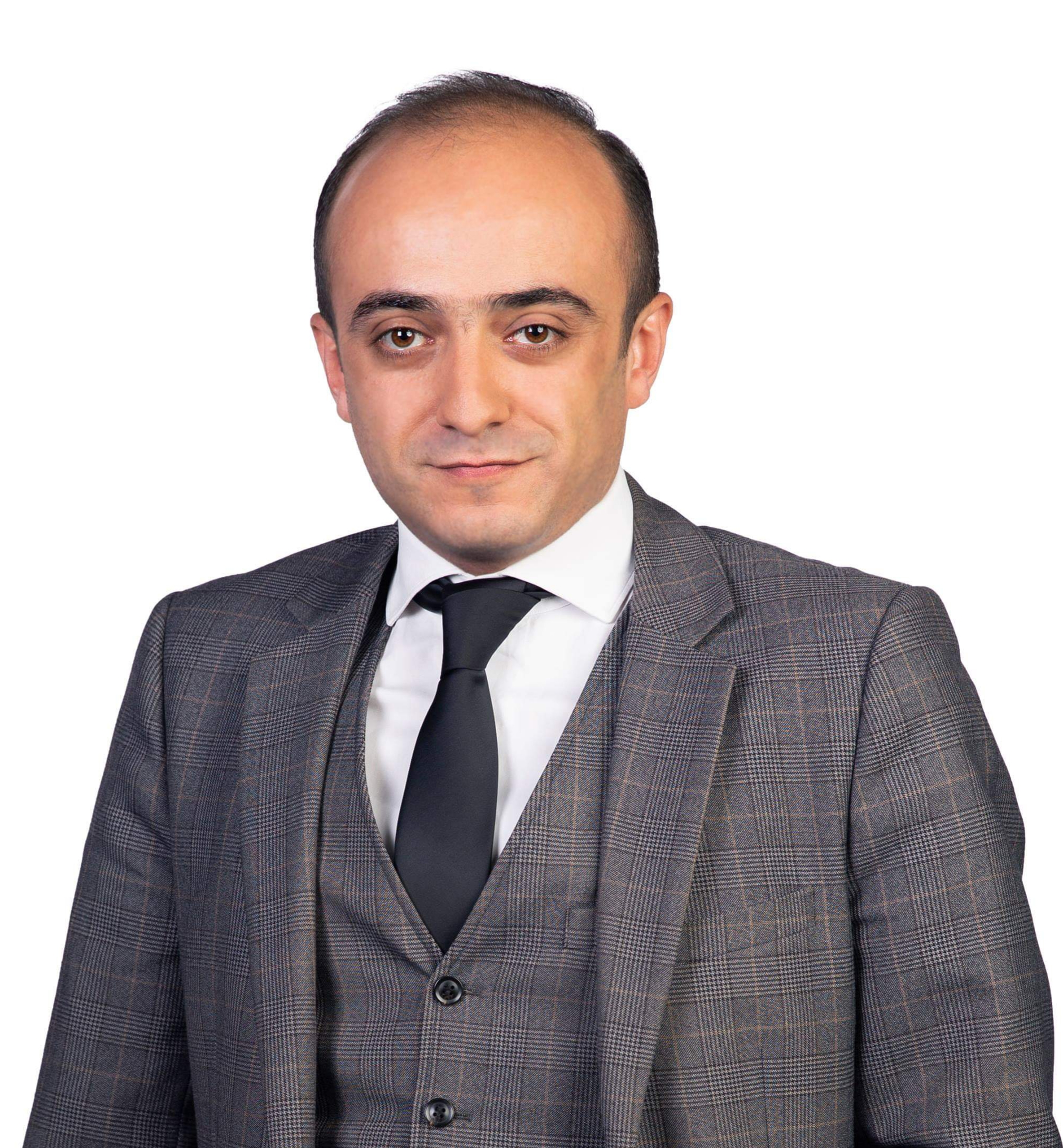

Lawyer, Scientist, Statesman

Personal details
- Born: 22 January 1987 (age 39) Kirovakan, Armenia SSR, Soviet Union

Taron V. Simonyan (Armenian: Տարոն Սիմոնյան; born 22 January 1987), is an Armenian lawyer, scientist and statesman.

He is lecturer at Yerevan State University, a member of the professional council on providing Ph.D degree in Law in Armenia, attorney at law (advocate), founder of ELL Partnership Law Firm, co-founder of ARBANE foundation on pan-Armenian projects, co-founder of the Armenian Center of International and Comparative Law (ICLaw-Armenia), co-founder of Mediators of Armenia, co-founder of the Arbitrators’ Association of Armenia, Arbitrator and Member at the European Arbitration Chamber (Brussels, Belgium). He was a Member of the National Assembly of Armenia (elected from Lori region of Armenia in 2018).

== Education and career ==
Simonyan graduated from the 1st School of Vanadzor in 2003. He studied at the Department of Law of Yerevan State University, graduating from it in 2007 with Bachelor's in Jurisprudence with Honorary Distinction. While studying at YSU, Simonyan served as President of its Student Council Department of Law and was also a member of its Scientific Council of the Department of Law as well as President of Committee by Law Matters of the Student Council of the Yerevan State University. He continued his studies at YSU, and while studying for his Master's, he served as a member of Council and Big Council of the Department of Law at the same alma mater. He was then promoted to the President of the Student Council, and after obtaining Master's degree in European Law in 2009, enrolled into Tavitian Scholarship Program at the Fletcher School of Law and Diplomacy of Tufts University in Boston/Medford, Massachusetts. In 2010, he returned to Yerevan State University where he was awarded a Ph.D. in Theory of Law and State in 2012. Immediately after graduation, Simonyan started his career at the Department of Law of YSU, serving at first as a lecturer (docent) of the Chair of Theory and History of State and Law.

As a lecturer, Taron Simonyan, has the following legal courses: Teaching Theory of State and Law; History of State and Law of Foreign Countries; History of Political and Legal Teachings; Legal Technics; Legal Anthropology .

As a member of the Armenian Parliament, he was a Member of the Commission on State and Legal Affairs, Member of the Bright Armenia Faction, Member of the EuroNest Parliamentary Assembly, Co-Chairman of the Committee on Economic Integration, Legal Approximation and Convergence with EU Policies (ECON), Member of different Parliamentary-Friendship groups.

From 2017-2019 he was the National Correspondent of Armenia in the United Nations Commission on International Trade Law (UNCITRAL).

He started legal practice in 2008 as a lawyer, attorney at law, and legal expert.

== Publications ==
1. Social Studies. Grade 11: Textbook for general education basic school / N. Galstyan, T. Simonyan (Themes 1 and 5), A. Manucharyan — Yerevan: "Zangak" Publishing House, 2025.— 195 pages.
2. Social Studies. Grade 9: Textbook for general education basic school / K. Harutyunyan, T. Simonyan (Theme 1), A. Manucharyan, N. Galstyan.— Yerevan: "Zangak" Publishing House, 2025.— 176 pages.
3. "Parliamentary culture and ethics in the Republic of Armenia", Book in Armenian and Russian languages, Taron Simonyan, Norayr Balayan, Yerevan, "Hairapet" publishing house, 2024, 176 pages. “Парламентская культура и этика в Республике Армения”, Книга на армянском и русском языках, Тарон Симонян, Норайр Балаян.– Ереван: Изд-во «Айрапет», 2024, 128 с
4. Social science. 8th grade: Textbook for general education school / K. Harutyunyan, H. Barseghyan, T. Simonyan (Topic 2).— Yerevan.: "Zangak" publishing house, 2024.— 144 pages.
5. "Accessible law, questions and answers. 2023", "ELL Partnership" law firm, Yerevan, Hayrapet publishing house, 2023, co-author, 304 pages
6. “Problems of Qualification of a Non-International Armed Conflict under International Humanitarian Law”, article, co-authored with Maria Hovhannisyan, "Gitakan Artsakh" periodical, 2023, N. 3rd (18), p. 16-23
7. State-legal complexity and synergy / Part 2, Synergy of Law or Complexity of Contemporary Law, 2023 | Monograph, Yerevan, Hayrapet publishing house, 2023, 240 pages
8. Social studies: 7th grade: Textbook for general education school / K. Harutyunyan, H. Barseghyan, N. Galstyan, A. Manucharyan, T. Simonyan (Topic 4, Topic 6).— Yer.: "Zangak" publishing house, 2023.— 120 pages.
9. “The Fourth Industrial Revolution and the New Path of Law”, Article, Journal of Yerevan University. Jurisprudence, YSU Press, 2023. No 2, p. 21-35
10. “The challenge of the supremacy of the irrationality in the development of Armenian statehood and constitutional culture” - The collection "The Value Origins of the Constitutional Culture in the Folds of the Thousand-Year Chronicle of the Armenian People" published under the auspices of the Mother See, Chief Editor G. Harutyunyan, Yerevan, 2023, 1072+64 insert pages, pages 943-963.
11. “The Challenges of Law at the Edge of Social Chaos”, Articles of the annual conference of the Faculty of Law YSU, 2022, Yerevan
12. Влияние избирательной системы на реализацию демократии, Книга на армянском и русском языках, в соавторстве с В. Айвазян (Глава 1), А. Манасян (Глава 2), Т. Симонян (Глава 3: Актуальные правовые и политические вызовы в контексте трансформации демократии), Ереван, 2022 г.
13. “Public policy exception as ground for excluding the recognition and enforcement of the arbitration award in the legal system of the Republic of Armenia”, “State and Law”, 2022, The Bar Association of RA, YSU, N. 2(93), Yerevan, pp. 41–58
14. “Legal Symbolism and Constitutional Policy in Contemporary Reality օf Changes“, Studia Politologiczne (Political Science Studies), published by the Institute of Political Science of Warsaw University, Warsaw, 2021, Vol, 61, (Co-Author with Manasyan A.), pp. 152–185
15. “Social Science” school manual for 11th class, Konrad Adenauer Foundation – Armenia, Ministry of Education, Science, Culture and Diaspora, Center of European Studies, YSU, Yerevan, 2020, Co-author, Chapters: 1, 2, 3, 4
16. “The Evolution of the Principle of Self-Determination and the ICJ Advisory Opinion on the Declaration of Independence of Kosovo”, 2019, Article, State and Law, N 1 (83), Yerevan, 2019, pages: 35-43
17. “Controlled Reality and the Fiction of Freedom: Synergy Algorithms”, 2018, Article, Materials of the Conference Devoted to the 85th Anniversary of the Faculty of Law at Yerevan State University, Yerevan, YSU Press, 2018, p. 25-35
18. Civilitarian social order in the context of the civilizational maturity of the Armenian Nation, Article, “Banver of Yerevan State University, Law, Yerevan, 2018 № 3 (27), pages: 55-59
19. “Practical Challenges of a Lawyer in XXI century: Artificial Intelligence”, Articles of the annual conference of the Faculty of Law YSU, 2018, Yerevan, pp. 35–45
20. “ARBANE: lao’s awakening”, Book, Monography, Yerevan, 2018.
21. “Social Science” school manual for 11th class, Konrad Adenauer Foundation – Armenia, Center for European Studies – YSU, 2017, Chapter 1 and 2.
22. “Changing nature of Freedom in the complexity of the XXI century Law”, Articles of the annual conference of the Faculty of Law YSU, 2017, Yerevan, pp. 29–41
23. “Legal Dynamics in Social Systems out of Equilibrium: the Problem of Random Interventions”, Articles of the annual conference of the Faculty of Law YSU, Yerevan, 2016, pp. 33–43.
24. “Issues of Military Law”, 2015, Yerevan, OSCE, Co-author
25. "Accessible Law: questions and answers", 2015, Yerevan, ELL Partnership Law Firm, Ministry of Justice of the RA, School of Advocates of the RA, Co-editor, Co-author.
26. “Law for All” (Street Law) a manual for learners, 2015, Yerevan, GIZ, Co-author.
27. “The complexity of law determination and some discernible patterns within it in transitional and unstable societies”, Articles of the annual conference of the Faculty of Law (YSU), 2015, pp. 56–68.
28. “Legislative issues of a child’ right to be heard before the Court in the Republic of Armenia”, - “State and Law”, 2014, The Bar Association of RA, N 1(63), pp. 44–53.
29. “Nash Equilibrium as a mean for the determination of rules of law (for sovereign actors)”, 2013, Journal of Scientific Articles dedicated to the 80th anniversary of the Faculty of Law (YSU).
30. “Some features of the civil and common law traditions impact vis-a-vis sources of international law: comparative analysis”, 2013 | Article, Armenian yearbook of international and comparative law, Volume 1, 2013, pp 125–142
31. “Armenian-Turkish relations in the legal framework of the WTO”, 2013 | Article, Armenian yearbook of international and comparative law, Volume 1, 2013, pp. 148–150
32. “Review of the French constitutional council decision on the legality of the draft law on denial of the Armenian genocide”, 2013, Article, Armenian yearbook of international and comparative law, Volume 1, 2013, pp. 159–160
33. “Anticipation: judicial practice and development trends”, collection of articles "Civil law from the perspective of litigation", ABA ROLI / Rule of Law Institute of the American Bar Association, USAID / USAID, Yerevan, 2013, p. 8-23 (co-authored by Gor Torosyan)
34. “The right of a participant of a limited liability company to participate in the management of the company, the procedure for exiting the company and legal application issues”, "Civil law from the perspective of litigation" collection of articles, ABA ROLI / Rule of Law Institute of the American Bar Association, USAID / USAID, Yerevan, 2013, p. 24-43 (co-authored by Gor Torosyan)
35. “State-Legal Complexity and Synergetics: Part 1, Complexity of Transitional and Unstable Social-State Systems: Synergetic Vision”, Monograph, 2013, Yerevan, YSU Press
36. “Historical backgrounds for the Development of the Concept on Synergy of Law”, 2013, Journal of Scientific Articles dedicated to the 100th anniversary of Professor Sh. Petrosyan.
37. “Complexity and Management of the Development of Unstable and Transitional Statehoods: Choice in Bifurcations.” - “State and Law”, 2012, The Bar Association of RA, N 4(58), pp. 4–17.
38. “The Legitimation of State Authority in Unstable Statehoods acting in Transitions” - “Bulletin of Yerevan University”, “Social Sciences”, “Jurisprudence”, YSU, 2012, N. 137.3, 24-39.
39. “The Complexity of Contemporary Law: Synergetic Approach”, - Journal of Scientific Articles dedicated to the 20th Independence of the Republic of Armenia, 2012, pp. 181–199.
40. “The applicability of the social synergetic’s main concepts and principles in the research of unstable social systems” - “State and Law”, 2011, The Bar Association of RA, N 3 (53), pp. 66–83.
41. “The role of time perceivement and social initial and current memory in unstable and transitional societies” - “State and Law”, 2011, The Bar Association of RA, N 1 (51), pp. 56–67.
42. “Synergetics as an interdisciplinary path of postclassical science” – “State and Law”, 2010, The Bar Association of RA, N 1 (47), pp. 81–91.
43. “The features of the impact of Civil and Common Law traditions vis-à-vis the sources of International Law” (English version) – “Bulletin of Yerevan University”, “Social Sciences”, “Jurisprudence”, YSU, 2010, N. 131.3, pp. 64–79.
44. “The problem of the end of history and its interpretation through the liberal law-understanding” - “State and Law”, The Bar Association of RA, 2008, N. 1-2 (43-44), p. 80-90.
45. “The elements of customary international law” – “State and Law”, The Bar Association of RA, 2008, N. 3 (41), p. 58-69.
