= Nelly Danielyan =

Armenian painter (born 1978)

Nelly Danielyan Նելլի Դանիելյան
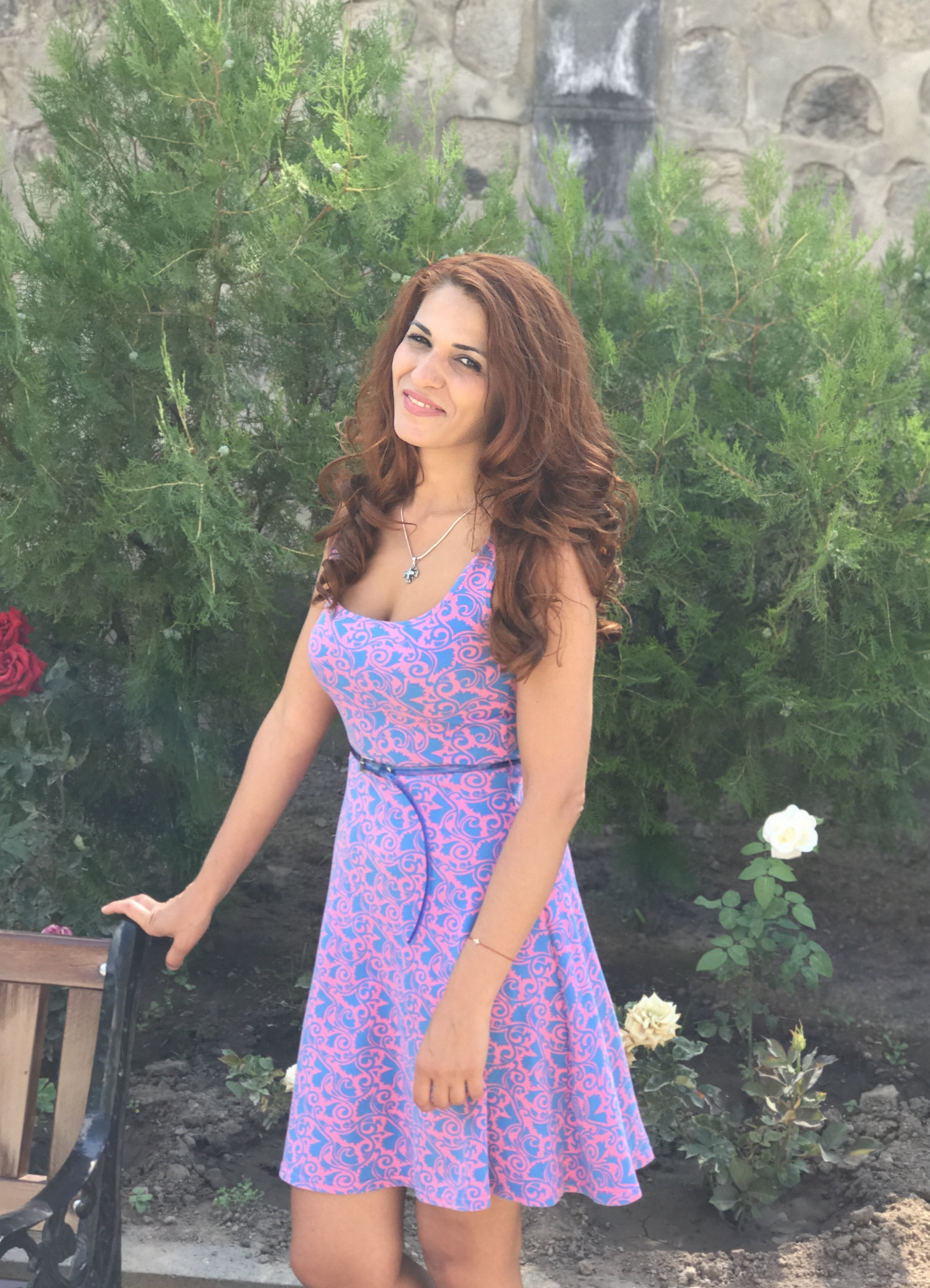
- Born: June 29, 1978 (age 48); Yerevan, Armenia
- Website: http://www.nellydanielyan.com

Nelly Gevorg Danielyan (Armenian: Նելլի Դանիելյան; born 29 June 1978, in Yerevan) is an Armenian painter, as well as a member of the Artists’ Union of Armenia, Artists’ Union of the Russian Federation, and the International Federation of Painters of UNESCO. She is also co-president of International Creative Association of Phytocollagists in Moscow.

== Biography ==
Nelly Danielyan was born in Yerevan in 1978. In 1996, she graduated as a painter-decorator. In 1999, she graduated from the Department of Fine Arts of Armenian State Pedagogical University as a teacher of painting and decorative applied art. In 2015, she took qualification courses in Moscow Institute of Information Technologies and later in 2016, Danielyan took qualification courses in the Pedagogical University of Moscow. Danielyan has been a member of the Artists’ Union of Armenia since 2002, and since 2004 she has been a member of the Artists' Union of the Russian Federation and International Federation of Painters of UNESCO.

In 2008, Danielyan was awarded the prize ‘’Crystal Flower’’ for the original approach of her works, application of artistic elements and innovative ideas in caricature collages.

In 2009, in the 4th international exhibition ‘’Floristic Sketches’’ held in Moscow, Danielyan was awarded the honorary gold medal and the title of laureate for the creation, distribution, and protection of cultural values. In 2009, she was awarded the honorary prize of public recognition, ‘’Master of beauty’’ for her contribution to the patriotic, artistic and cultural upbringing of the young generation in Moscow.

Since 2009, Danielyan has been the co-president of the International Creative Association of Phytocollagists in Moscow. In 2013, she participated in the seminar of Gregor Lersh, German architect-decorator. In 2015, Nelly Danielyan was awarded the Star 2015 Prize in Moscow for the development and contribution to a new type of art – caricature collage.

Since 2015, she has been known as the founder and artistic director of "Rainbow World," the children's painting studio in the town of Dolgoprudny. Her works can be found in different art galleries in the world. In the summer of 2016, Danielyan and Astghik Hakobyan arranged a charity exhibition titled Return. Nelly Danielyan's spiritual works have been exhibited in the State Museum of Nature of Armenia, in Goris, Sisian, Vanadzor, Gyumri, Tsaghkadzor and Oshakan.

The artists donated one painting to each art gallery hosting the exhibitions. The exhibition proceeds were donated to the family of Shant Ghazaryan, a soldier wounded at the four-day war. In 2016, Danielyan was awarded the title of laureate of Nashe Podmoskovye-2016 in the nomination ‘’Kind Heart’’ by the governor of Moscow district.

In 2016, she was awarded the Medal of Honour by the International Creative Association of Phytocollagists for active participation in the organisation. In the same year, by the order of the Minister of Science and Education of the Russian Federation, Danielyan took qualification courses and was awarded the title of first rank teacher of fine arts and art history in the town of Dolgoprudny. Danielyan has been participating in national and international exhibitions since 1993.

== Exhibitions ==
- 1993, International exhibition in ‘’Mobyus’’ exhibition hall in Moscow devoted to the International Day for Protection of Children.
- 1997, Yerevan, National students exhibition in the exhibition hall of the Artists’ Union of Armenia devoted to the International Day of Women.
- 1998, City exhibition in the Chamber Music Hall after Komitas in Yerevan.
- 2002, Yerevan, National exhibition in the exhibition hall of the Artists’ Union of Armenia devoted to the Victory Day.
- 2002, Yerevan, National exhibition in the exhibition hall of the Artists’ Union of Armenia titled ‘’Mount Ararat in Armenian fine arts’’.
- 2004, Tbilisi, International exhibition ‘’Art Expo-Art Caucasus 2004’’.
- 2004, National exhibition of phytocollagists in Moscow Journalist House.
- 2005, International exhibition ‘’Salon 2005’’ in the Central House of Artists in Moscow
- 2007-2008, International floristic festival ‘’Flowers of the World’’ in the State History Museum of Moscow.
- 2009, Yerevan, National youth exhibition in the exhibition hall of the Artists’ Union of Armenia.
- 2009, exhibition devoted to the 100th anniversary of the town of Yaroslavl in the State Museum of the History of Yaroslavl.
- 2010, Personal exhibition ‘’My way’’ in ‘’Florissima’’ exhibition hall of Moscow.
- 2011, Yerevan. International exhibition ‘’Transformation’’, with the support of International Art Association ‘’Florissima’’, Artists’ Union of Armenia and Armenian branch of ‘’Rossotrudnichestvo ’’
- 2011, Moscow. International exhibition ‘’Transformation ’’ in the exhibition hall ‘’Gostinniy Dvor’’.
- 2012, Vitebsk. International exhibition ‘’Slavic Etudes’’ in the State Museum of Fine Arts devoted to the international art festival ‘’Slavic Bazaar in Bitebsk’’.
- 2012, Vienna. International exhibition in the Centre of Russian Art and Science in Vienna, devoted to the Russian Days.
- 2013, Exhibition ‘’Armenian Painters of Moscow’’ in the exhibition hall of Moscow House of the Peoples.
- 2013, New York. International ‘’Art Seminar of Visual Arts’’ in Solomon Guggenheim Museum.
- 2013, Yerevan. National youth exhibition ‘’Single piece of work’’ in the exhibition hall of Artists’ Union of Armenia.
- 2013, Vitebsk. Charity masterclasses on the topic ‘’Techniques of Phytocollages’’ in the Centre of State Culture and History ‘’Dvin’’ for the children of Vitebsk orphanage devoted to the International Day for Protection of Children.
- 2013, Moscow. 20th Jubilee International Exhibition ‘’Flowers-IPM 2013’’, master demo-class ‘’Fine Arts in Modern Collages’’.
- 2014, Vitebsk. Russian-Belorussian exhibition ‘’Spring’’, ‘’Lady Stranger’’, ‘’Drop’’. *2014, Moscow. Flowers-IPM.
- 2015, Brest. International exhibition of phytocollagists and masterclasses on the topic of ‘’Monotipie Techniques’’ for the children of Brest in the Provinciological Museum of Brest.
- 2015, Yerevan. National exhibition devoted to the International Day of Women, in the exhibition hall of Artists’ Union of Armenia.
- 2015, Yerevan, Thematic exhibition ‘’The Tricolour is Mine’’ in the exhibition hall of Artists’ Union of Armenia.
- 2015, Charity masterclasses on the topic ‘’Theory of Colour’’ for the children of Yerevan, in the exhibition hall of Artists’ Union of Armenia.
- 2015, International exhibition ‘’I Remember and Demand’’ devoted to the 100th anniversary of the Armenian Genocide, in the exhibition hall of Moscow Diocese of Armenian Apostolic Church.
- 2015, Youzhno-Sakhalinsk, 6th International Festival ‘’Flowers of Sakhalin’’ in Fine Arts Museum.
- 2015, Moscow. International exhibition devoted to the 15th anniversary of the foundation of International Association of Phytocollagists of Moscow.
- 2016, Moscow. Exhibition ‘’Hold on, second, you are glorious’’, under the auspices of the Union of Armenian Women in Russia on the occasion of the International Day of Women in the exhibition hall ‘’PunTo ArTe’’.
- 2016, Moscow. International annual exhibition ‘’Lady Stranger’’, in the Central House of Journalists in Moscow.
- 2016, London. Winner of ‘’EthnoArtFest ’’ International Festival.

== Sources ==
- Сайт учителя изобразительного искусства
- Открылась Четвертая международная выставка флористического коллажа "Флористические этюды"
- Сон в картинах
- Website
