= Hovnanadzor =

Village in Lori, Armenia

Hovnanadzor Հովնանաձոր
- Location within Armenia
- Coordinates: 41°01′54″N 44°31′37″E
- Country: Armenia
- Province: Lori
- Elevation: 1,440 m (4,720 ft)

Population (2011)
  - Total: 83
- Time zone: UTC+4 (AMT)

Hovnanadzor (Armenian: Հովնանաձոր, also Ovandara) is a village in the Lori Province of Armenia.
