= Srbuhi Grigoryan =

Armenian politician

- Սրբուհի Գրիգորյան

Member of the National Assembly of Armenia
- Incumbent
- Assumed office 14 January 2019
- Parliamentary group: Bright Armenia

Personal details
- Born: 29 December 1974 (age 51) Sisian, Armenia SSR, Soviet Union
- Party: Bright Armenia

Srbuhi Grigoryan (Armenian: Սրբուհի Գրիգորյան; born 29 December 1974), is an Armenian politician, Member of the National Assembly of Armenia of Bright Armenia's faction.
