= Karine Danielyan =

Armenian environmentalist and politician (1947–2022)

- Կարինե Դանիելյան (Armenian)
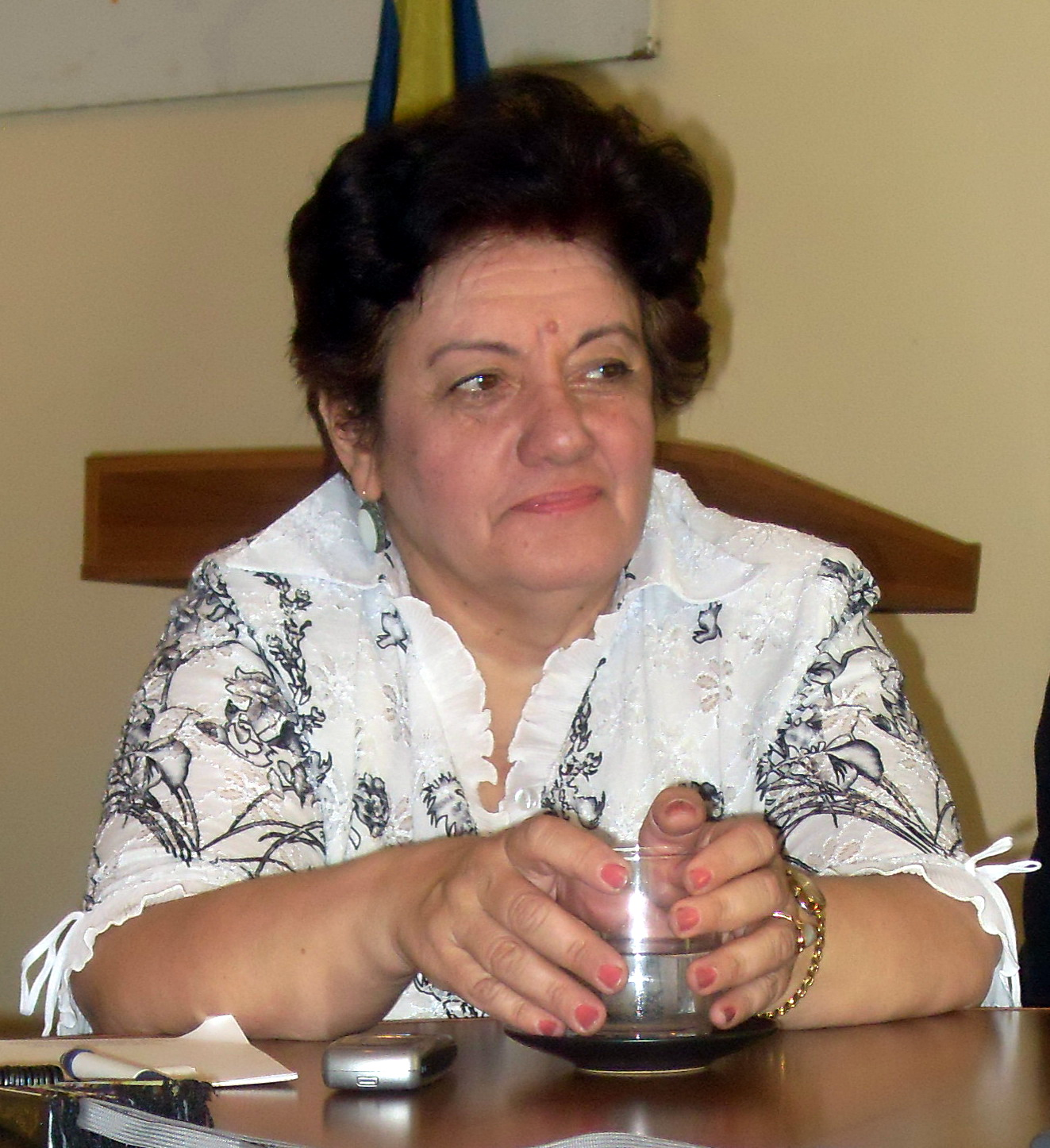
- Danielyan in 2010

Minister of Nature Protection
- Preceded by: Position Established
- In office 1991–1994

Personal details
- Born: 9 June 1947 Yerevan, Armenian Soviet Socialist Republic, Soviet Union
- Died: 4 April 2022 (aged 74)
- Party: Pan-Armenian National Movement
- Education: Yerevan State University (Department of Biophysics, Faculty of Biology) Academy of Sciences, Armenian SSR

Karine Danielyan (Armenian: Կարինե Դանիելյան; 9 June 1947 – 4 April 2022), was an Armenian politician, biophysicist, and opinion journalist, who served as Minister of Nature Protection of Armenia from 1991 to 1994. Her death was announced on Facebook on the 4th of April 2022 by her daughter.

== Education ==
In 1970, Danielyan graduated from the Department of Biophysics of the Faculty of Biology of Yerevan State University. From 1971 to 1974, she studied the postgraduate course of the Academy of Sciences of the Armenian SSR.From 1994 to 1996, she studied the Yerevan State University doctoral program.

== Career ==
Most notably, from 1991 to 1994, Danielyan was the first Minister of Nature Protection in the newly established state of Armenia; the successor state to the Armenian SSR under the Soviet Union.

Danielyan worked as a junior researcher at the Institute of Experimental Biology of the Academy of Sciences of the Armenian SSR from 1976 to 1980. After this, she served as Scientific Secretary of the Scientific Council of Biosphere Issues of the Academy of Sciences of the Armenian SSR until 1985.

Danielyan's first official position was that of Head of the Department of the Institute of Scientific and Technical Information under the Council of Ministers of the Armenian SSR, which she served as from 1985 to 1990. She then served as Deputy Chairman of the Executive Committee of the Yerevan City Council for Environment and Health from 1990 to 1991, after which she took her position as Minister of Nature Protection of Armenia.

From 1996 to 2010, Danielyan worked as an associate professor at the YSU, becoming a professor in 2010. Also from 1996 to her death, she served as president of the Association for Sustainable Human Development NGO.

After 1991, Danielyan also worked as an opinion journalist, writing articles mainly about the state of the environment.
