= Hamazasp Danielyan =

Armenian politician

- Համազասպ Դանիելյան

Member of the National Assembly of Armenia
- Parliamentary group: My Step Alliance

Personal details
- Born: November 15, 1984 (age 41) Yerevan, Armenian SSR, Soviet Union
- Party: Independent
- Education: Yerevan State University

Hamazasp Danielyan (Armenian: Համազասպ Գրիգորի Դանիելյան; born 15 November 1984) is an Armenian political figure and a current Member of Parliament.

Danielyan is a member of OSCE Parliamentary Assembly, as well as the chair of Armenia-Slovakia parliamentary friendship group.

Danielyan is the co-ordinator of the Parliamentary Working Group on Electoral Reform, tasked with making amendments to the Armenian Electoral Code. In 2018, he also served on a Prime Minister's Special Commission on Electoral Reform, which brought forward a number of amendments that ultimately failed to pass in Parliament, which, at that time, was still dominated by the Republican Party of Armenia.

== Education and professional career ==
Danielyan graduated from Yerevan State University in 2006, with a degree in Political Science. In 2009, he defended his PhD thesis on the influence of external political factors on Armenia's democratization process.

Between 2009 and 2017 he taught as a lecturer at Yerevan State University in the areas of political science, public administration, diaspora studies, and journalism.

From 2016 and up until his election as a member of National Assembly, Danielyan serves as the Adviser to Programmes in Armenia of the Calouste Gulbenkian Foundation and focal point in country.

Since 2014 member of International Political Science Association (IPSA), participant of 23rd IPSA World Congress in Montreal (2014), 24th IPSA World Congress in Poznan (2016).

== Political career ==
Following the 2018 Armenian revolution, during the early elections that took place on December 9, 2018, Danielyan was included on the My Step Alliance national party list, occupying the 66th position. He became one of the 88 My Step MPs elected to the National Assembly, taking office in January 2019.
