= Anush Begloian =

Armenian politician (born 1969)

- Անուշ Բեղլոյան
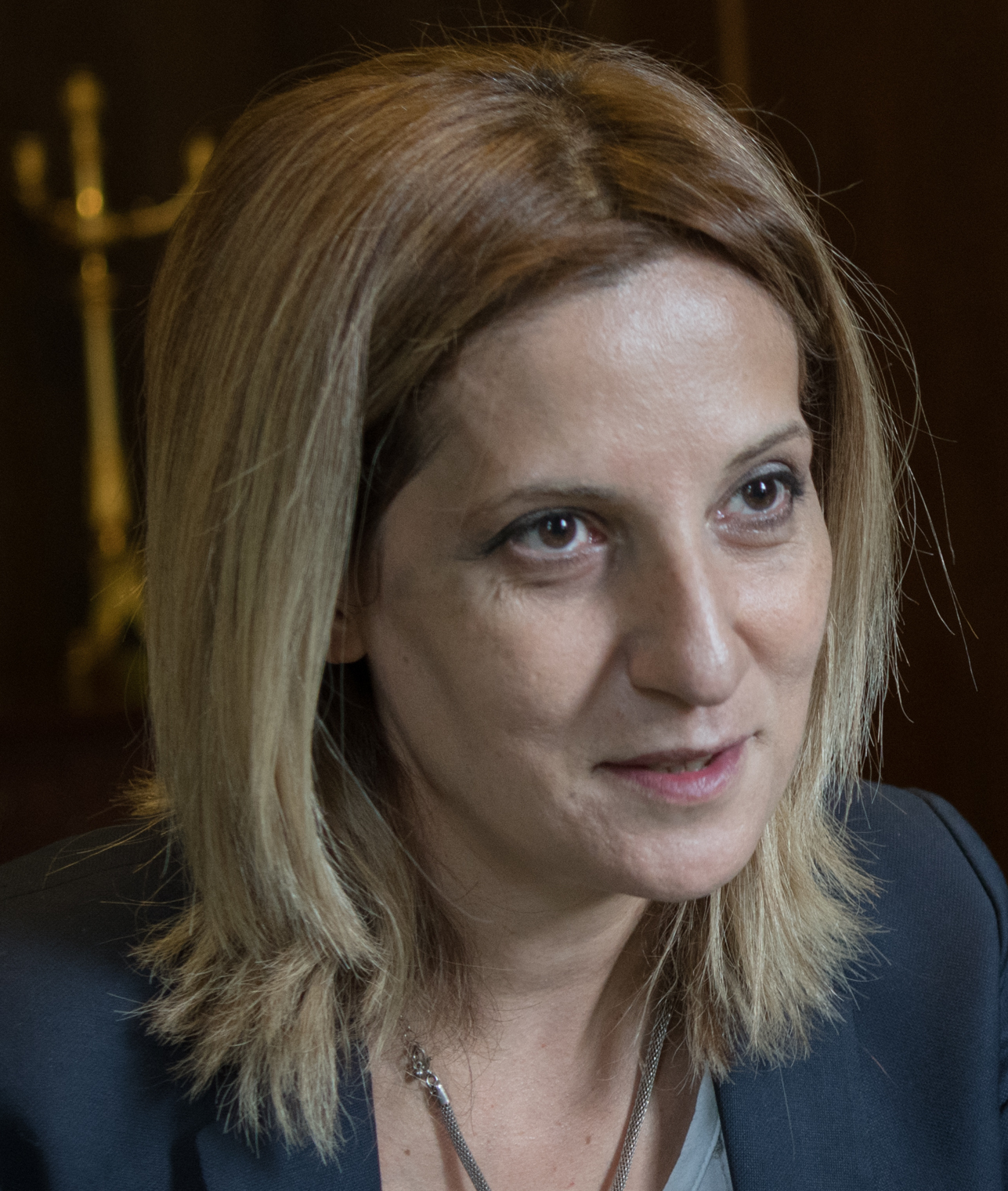

Member of Parliament in the National Assembly of Armenia
- Incumbent
- Assumed office 2018
- Parliamentary group: My Step Alliance

Personal details
- Born: Anush Begloian; 31 July 1969 (age 57) Yerevan, Armenian SSR, Soviet Union
- Party: Civil Contract
- Education: Yerevan State University

Anush Begloian (Armenian: Անուշ Բեղլոյան; born 31 July 1969) is an Armenian physicist and politician of the Civil Contract. Since the Parliamentary Election in 2018, she has been a member of the National Assembly of Armenia.

== Education ==
Anush Begloian was born and raised in Yerevan, Soviet Armenia. She studied physics at the Yerevan State University from where she graduated in 1991, and obtained an MBA from the American University of Armenia in Yerevan in 1995.

== Professional career ==
Throughout her career, she was employed by various foreign and international entities such as the United States Agency for International Development (USAID), the World Bank and the United Nations High Commissioner for Refugees. She specialized in public relations and communications was the executive director of the NGO Armenian Public Relations Association between 2003 and 2009. Between 2005 and 2009 she also lectured on Business Communication and Public relations at the University of France in Armenia. In 2008 she took a hold in the private sector and was “ArmenTel” CJSC's head of public relations until 2014. In 2016 she returned as a lecturer to the University of France in Armenia.

== Political career ==
Before she was elected to the National Assembly of Armenia as Member of Parliament of the Civil Contract over the My Step Alliance in December 2018, she was a consultant to the Chief of Staff of the Armenian Parliament. In Parliament she is a member in the Armenian-Lithuanian and the Armenian-British Friendship Group. In November 2019 she assumed as the vice-president of the Parliamentary Assembly of the Black Sea Economic Cooperation a post for which she was elected for one year.

== Personal life ==
Anush Begloian is married and has two children.
