= Vagharshak Hakobyan =

Armenian politician

- Վաղարշակ Հակոբյան
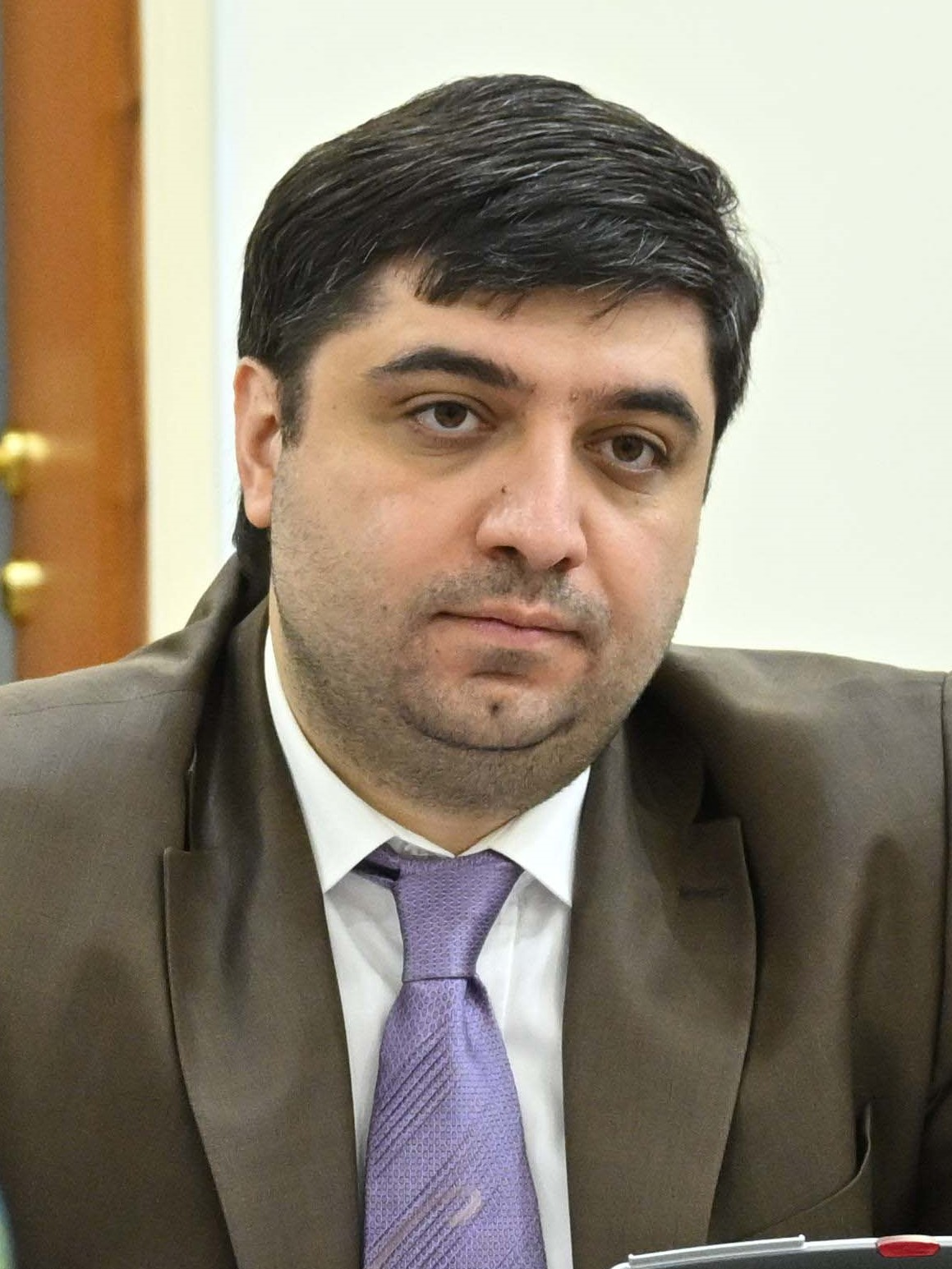
- Hakobyan in 2023

Member of the National Assembly of Armenia
- Incumbent
- Assumed office 14 January 2019
- Parliamentary group: My Step Alliance
- Constituency: Kotayk

Personal details
- Born: 1 January 1991 (age 35) Tsaghkadzor, Armenia
- Party: Civil Contract

Vagharshak Hakobyan (Armenian: Վաղարշակ Հակոբյան; born 1 January 1991), is an Armenian turkologist and politician, Member of the National Assembly of Armenia of My Step Alliance's faction.

== Biography ==
Vagharshak Hakobyan was born on January 1, 1991, in Tsakhkadzor, Armenia.

=== Education ===
- 1997–2007, secondary school of the city of Tsakhkadzor.
- 2007–2011, graduated from the Faculty of Oriental Studies at Yerevan State University. Bachelor's degree. Turkologist.
- 2013, graduated from the Faculty of Oriental Studies of the International Scientific Educational Center of National Academy of Sciences (NAS) of Armenia. Master's degree. Orientalist.
- 2013–2016, postgraduate study of the Faculty of Oriental Studies at the International Scientific and Educational Center of the National Academy of Sciences of Armenia. PhD in History.

=== Social and political activity ===
- 2012, established the Armenian Association of Young Politicians.
- 2015–2016, lecturer at Yerevan French College and the European Regional Academy in Armenia.
- 2018-January 14, 2019, assistant to the Minister of Diaspora of Armenia.

December 9, 2018 - Elected Member of the National Assembly of Armenia.

== Scientific activity ==
Author of a number of scientific articles.
