= Narine Tukhikyan =

Armenian politician and journalist

- Նարինե Թուխիկյան

Member of the National Assembly
- In office January 14, 2019 – July 10, 2019

Ministry spokesperson
- Incumbent
- Assumed office June 11, 2019

Personal details
- Born: February 16, 1962 (age 64) Yerevan, Armenian SSR
- Education: Yerevan State University

Narine Tukhikyan (also known as Narine Khachaturyan; Armenian: Նարինե Խաչատուրյան; born February 16, 1962) is an Armenian journalist, public, political, and cultural figure, and former director of the Hovhannes Tumanyan Museum (2007–2019). She was a member of the National Assembly of Armenia of the 7th convocation (My Step Alliance) (2018–2019). She is currently the spokesperson for the Ministry of Education, Science, Culture, and Sport of Armenia (since 2019).

== Biography ==
Narine Tukhikyan was born on February 16, 1962, in Yerevan, into the family of actor Levon Tukhikyan and writer, playwright Anna Petrosyan. In 1979, she graduated from Yerevan Secondary School No. 78, and in 1985, she graduated from the Department of Theater Studies of the Faculty of Philology of Yerevan State University. In 1987, she was trained at the Central Television in the USSR. She has attended management courses at the American University of Armenia.

=== Political career ===
On December 9, 2018, she was elected a deputy from the electoral list of the My Step Alliance in the parliamentary elections. On May 31, 2019, Narine Tukhikyan announced her resignation from the National Assembly.
