= Kuchak =

Village in Aragatsotn, Armenia

Kuchak Քուչակ
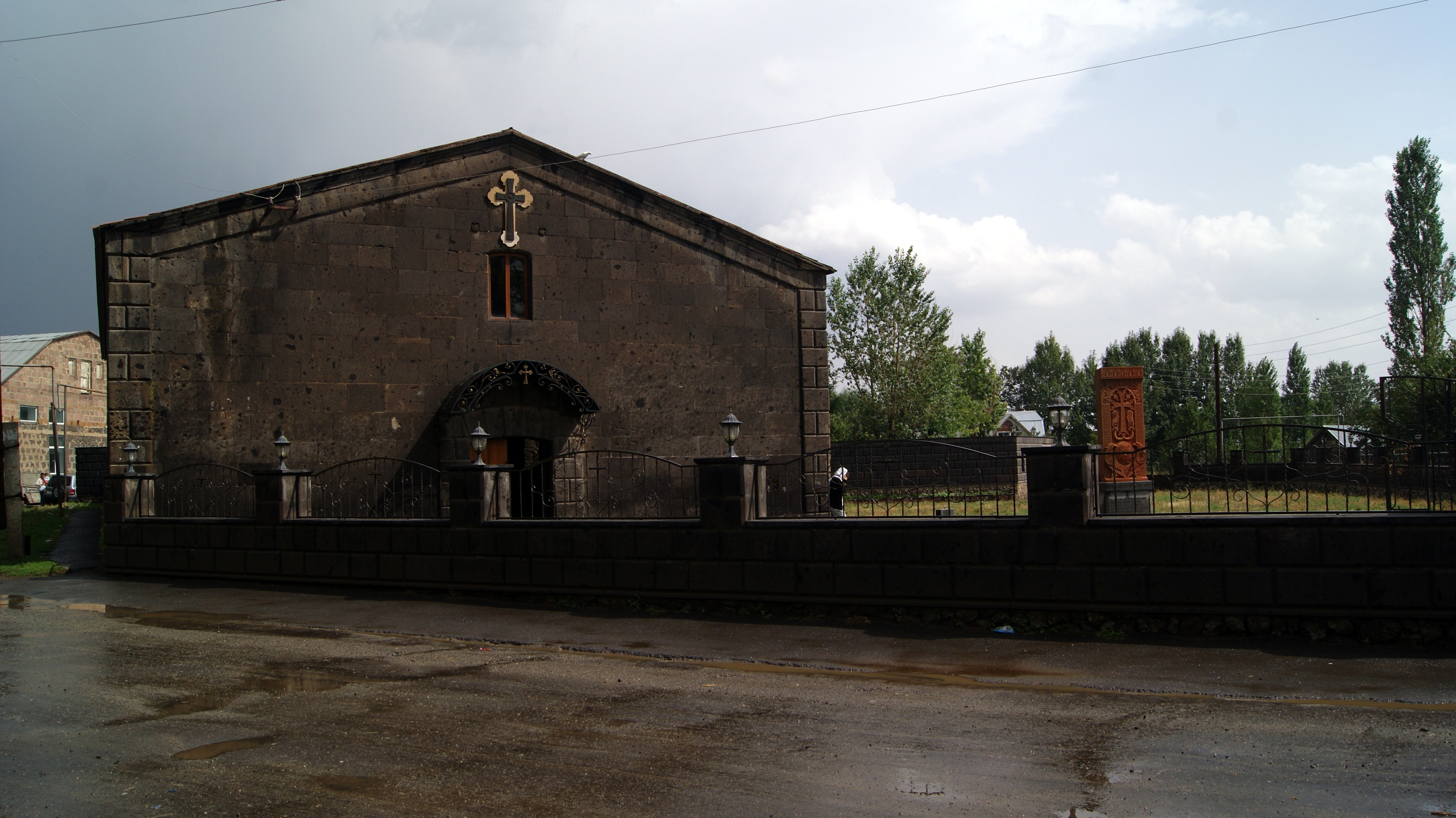
- Holy Mother of God Church in Kuchak

- Location within Armenia Location within Aragatsotn
- Coordinates: 40°31′31″N 44°23′30″E
- Country: Armenia
- Province: Aragatsotn
- Municipality: Aparan
- Founded: 1829-1830
- Elevation: 1,894 m (6,214 ft)

Population (2011)
  - Total: 2,147
- Time zone: UTC+4
  - Summer (DST): UTC+5

Kuchak (Armenian: Քուչակ) is a village in the Aparan Municipality of the Aragatsotn Province of Armenia. It was founded in 1829-30 and named after Nahapet Kuchak, a 16th-century Armenian poet.
