= Babken Simonyan =

Armenian writer (born 1952)

- Բաբկեն Սիմոնյան
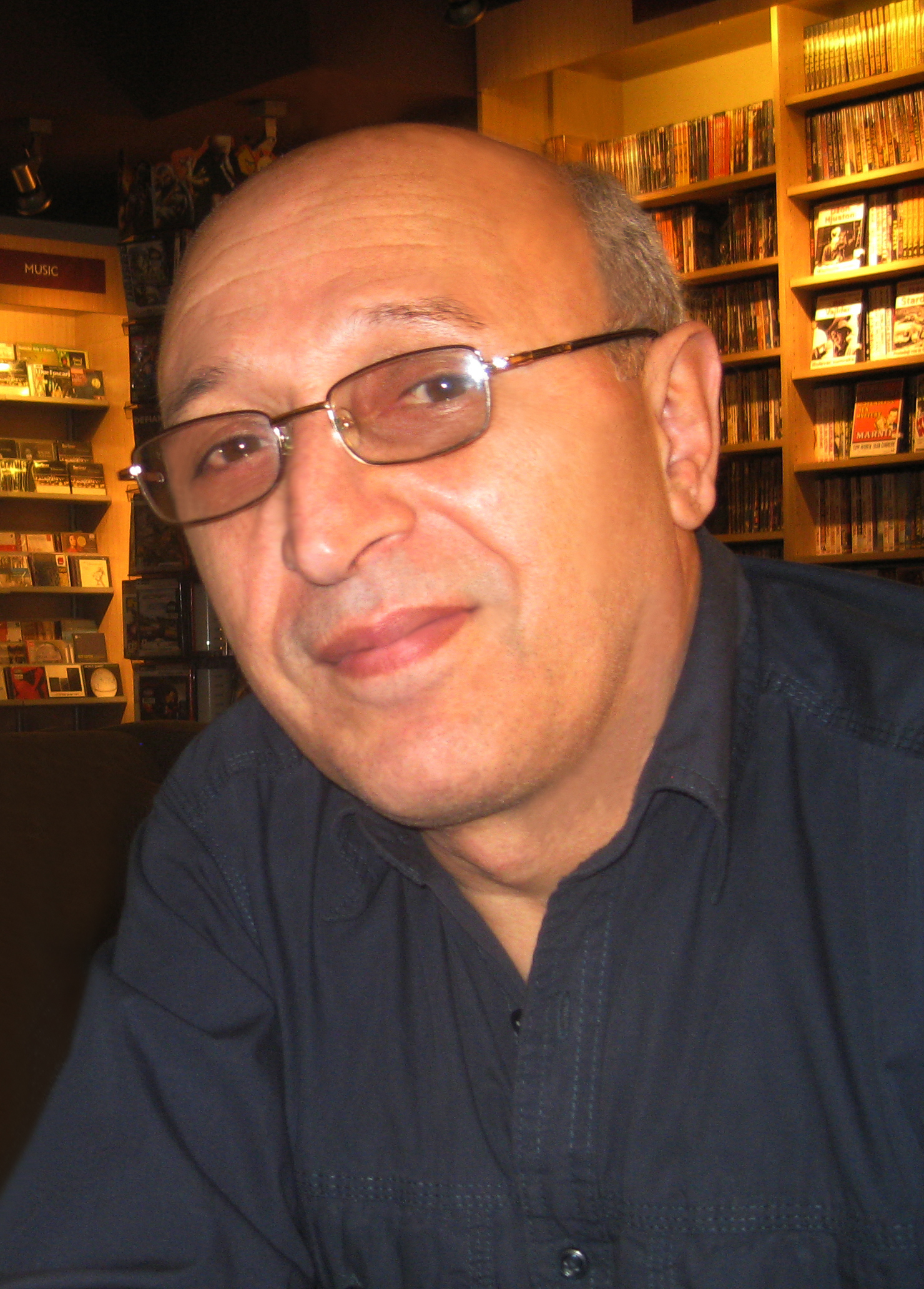
- Simonyan in 2015
- Born: 20 March 1952 (age 74); Yerevan, Armenian SSR, USSR
- Education: Yerevan State University
- Occupations: Poet, essayist, translator, diplomat
- Writing career
- Language: Armenian; Serbian

Babken Simonyan (Armenian: Բաբկեն Սիմոնյան, Serbian: Бабкен Симоњан, romanized: Babken Simonjan, born 20 March 1952) is an Armenian-Serbian poet, essayist, translator, university professor and diplomat currently serving as the honorary consul of Serbia in Armenia since 2006.

He is a member of the Writers Union of Armenia, Association of Writers of Serbia and Adligat. He teaches Serbian language at the Yerevan State University.

== Awards ==
- Branko Radičević Award (2012)
- Gold Medal (2015, by President of Serbia)
- Movses Khorenatsi Award (2019)

== Works ==
=== Books ===
- Miris domovine, 1994.
- Kroz balkansku vatru: putopisi, eseji, razgovori,1995.
- Hodočašće, 1998.
- Od Ararata do Kosova: (pesme, eseji, putopisi, beleške, prevodi), 2000.
- Bibliografija: Publikacija o Srbiji i jermensko-srpskim istorijskim, književnim i kulturnim vezama, 2002.
- Artamet, 2010.
- Хачкар: стихи, 2012.
- Grumen zemlje srpske, 2017.

=== Translations ===
- Noć skuplja vijeka, translation of Njegoš's work, 2022.

=== Articles ===
- Ani, 1991.
- Miris domovine, 1992.
- Moja stara kuća, 1992.
- Tuga, 1995.
- Još se čuje..., 1995.
- Molitva pred ikonom, 1995.
- Politika panturcizma kao ideološko oružje, 1996.
- Čovek jake volje, 1997.
- Riječ za riječ, 1997.
- Nad grobom Desanke Maksimović, 1997.
- Da je živa - u njen bih zagrljaj od tuge, 1998
- Majke što delila bi sa mnom bol - sad nema, 1998.
- Duboka žalost, da je iscelim ne umem..., 1998.
- Zgasla mati moja, plamičak ognjišta mog, 1998.
- Majci, 1998.
- Monolog, 1998.
- Traganje za duhovnom prošlošču, 1998.
- Iste su nam muke, stradanja i patnje, 1998.
- Simonida, 2000.
- Očaran njegoševskim metaforama, co-author, 2000.
- Tuga, 2000.
- Jeremnčić, 2000.
- Ararat, 2003.
- Sudbom slični, 20004.
- Sveto ime Lim, 2007.
- U ateljeu, 2007.
- Jermenija Srbiji; Dud Svetog Save; Santa Maria della Salute, 2010.
- Majčine ruke, 2010.
- Ogrejano kosovskim suncem, 2010.
- Prekinuta molitva, 2011.
- More i splavar, 2011.
- Grančica, 2011.
- Na mostu Rialto, 2011.
- Bela noć, 2011.
- Oprosti majko, 2011.
- Knjiga kao kult i duhovna hrana, 2011.
- Novo pesničko hodočašće, 2012.
- Od Svetog Save do "Kosovskog sunca", 2015.
- Moja stara kuća, 2015.
- Srpski pesnici pevaju Jermeniji, 2017.
- San, 2017.
- Santa Maria della Salute, 2017.
- Utri suze, Srbijo! 2017.
