= Bright Armenia =

Armenian political party

Bright Armenia Լուսավոր Հայաստան
- Leader: Edmon Marukyan
- Founded: December 12, 2015
- Headquarters: Yerevan
- Ideology: Classical liberalism; Pro-Europeanism
- Political position: Centre
- National affiliation: Way Out Alliance (2016–2018); Bright Alliance (2018)
- European affiliation: Alliance of Liberals and Democrats for Europe
- Slogan: "There is an Alternative, Vote!"
- National Assembly: 0 / 107
- Yerevan City Council: 0 / 65

Website
- brightarmenia.am

Bright Armenia (Armenian: Լուսավոր Հայաստան, romanized: Lusavor Hayastan) is a classical liberal political party in Armenia founded on 12 December 2015.

== History ==
In 2017, Bright Armenia launched an educational program aimed at advancing and promoting liberal politics, known as the Institute of Liberal Politics (ILP); it is an affiliated member of the European Liberal Forum.

In the 2017 Armenian parliamentary election and the 2017 Yerevan City Council election, the party took part in the elections as part of the Way Out Alliance, gaining few seats.

In the 2018 Yerevan City Council election, the party ran as a part of the Bright Alliance. The alliance won three seats in the Yerevan City Council, with two seats taken by Bright Armenia and one seat taken by the Hanrapetutyun Party.

Following the 2018 Armenian parliamentary election, Bright Armenia became the third largest party in the National Assembly and one of the two official opposition parties, the other being Prosperous Armenia.

In May 2021, the party confirmed it would participate in the 2021 Armenian parliamentary elections. Following the election, the party gained just 1.2% of the popular vote, losing all political representation in the National Assembly. The party currently acts as an extra-parliamentary force.

The party participated in the 2023 Yerevan City Council election with Davit Khazhakyan as their candidate for Mayor of Yerevan. Following the election, the party lost all representation in the Yerevan City Council, winning just 1.8% of the vote.

== Ideology ==
Bright Armenia is a liberal, pro-European political party. Edmon Marukyan called for raising relations with the European Union to a strategic partnership level. Party members also advocate for visa-free travel of Armenian citizens to the EU's Schengen Area. The party opposes Armenia's current membership in the Eurasian Economic Union and believes that Armenia should withdraw its membership and begin to negotiate an Association Agreement and Deep and Comprehensive Free Trade Area with the European Union. Bright Armenia supports Armenia's full membership in the EU and wishes to begin the first steps of accession negotiations without delay.

The party manifesto states, "Armenia should show initiative in pan-European processes and structures, presenting itself as the true bearer of the values of European civilization and democracy."

Despite the party's Pro-European orientation, Bright Armenia also believes in maintaining positive cooperation with Russia and ensuring that the interests of Armenia are not compromised in favor of other countries.

== Party council ==
The party council consists of the following members:

- Edmon Marukyan
- Gevorg Gorgisyan
- David Khazhakyan
- Ani Samsonyan
- Armen Yeghiazaryan
- Grigory Dokhoyan
- Karen Simonyan
- Srbuhi Grigoryan
- Aren Petunts
- Karine Ghukasyan
- Stepan Stepanyan
- Gevorg Nersesyan
- Angela Khachatryan
- Ararat Stepanyan
- Norayr Karapetyan
- Arshavir Khachatryan
- Igor Avakyan

== Electoral record ==
=== Parliamentary elections ===
Party leader Edmon Marukyan, was elected as an independent MP following the 2012 Armenian parliamentary election.

Election	Alliance	Votes	%	Seats	+/–	Position	Government
2017	part of Way Out Alliance	122,049	7.78	9 / 105	Steady	3rd	Opposition (2017–2018)
2017	part of Way Out Alliance	122,049	7.78	9 / 105	Steady	3rd	Government (2018)
2018	none	80,024	6.37	18 / 132	▲15	3rd	Opposition
2021	none	15,591	1.22	0 / 107	▼18	▼9th	Extra-parliamentary

=== Local elections ===
==== Yerevan City Council elections ====
Election	Alliance	Mayor candidate	Votes	%	Seats in City Council	+/–	Position
2017	part of Way Out Alliance	Nikol Pashinyan	70,730	21	14 / 65	Steady	2nd
2018	part of Bright Alliance	Artak Zeynalyan	18,114	4.99	3 / 65	▼11	▼3rd
2023	none	Davit Khazhakyan	4,174	1.8	0 / 65	▼3	▼7th

== See also ==
- Programs of political parties in Armenia
