= 8th National Assembly of Armenia =

National Assembly of the Republic of Armenia of the 8th convocation
←	7th convocation	9th convocation	→
- Parties in the National Assembly

Overview
- Legislative body: National Assembly
- Jurisdiction: Armenia
- Meeting place: National Assembly Building, Baghramyan 19, Yerevan
- Term: 1 August 2021 –
- Government: Civil Contract (71)
- Opposition: Armenia Alliance (29); I Have Honor Alliance (6)
- Website: parliament.am
- Members: 107
- President: Alen Simonyan, Civil Contract
- Vice Presidents: Ruben Rubinyan, Civil Contract; Hakob Arshakyan, Civil Contract
- Party control: Civil Contract majority

Sessions
- 1st: 1 August 2021 – 26 August 2021
- 2nd: 13 September 2021 – 16 December 2021
- 3rd: 2 May 2022 – 15 June 2022
- 4th: 12 September 2022 –

The eighth National Assembly of Armenia was elected at the 2021 Armenian parliamentary election. The President of the National Assembly of Armenia of the session is Alen Simonyan.

== Vice speakers ==
- Ruben Rubinyan
- Hakob Arshakyan

== Composition ==
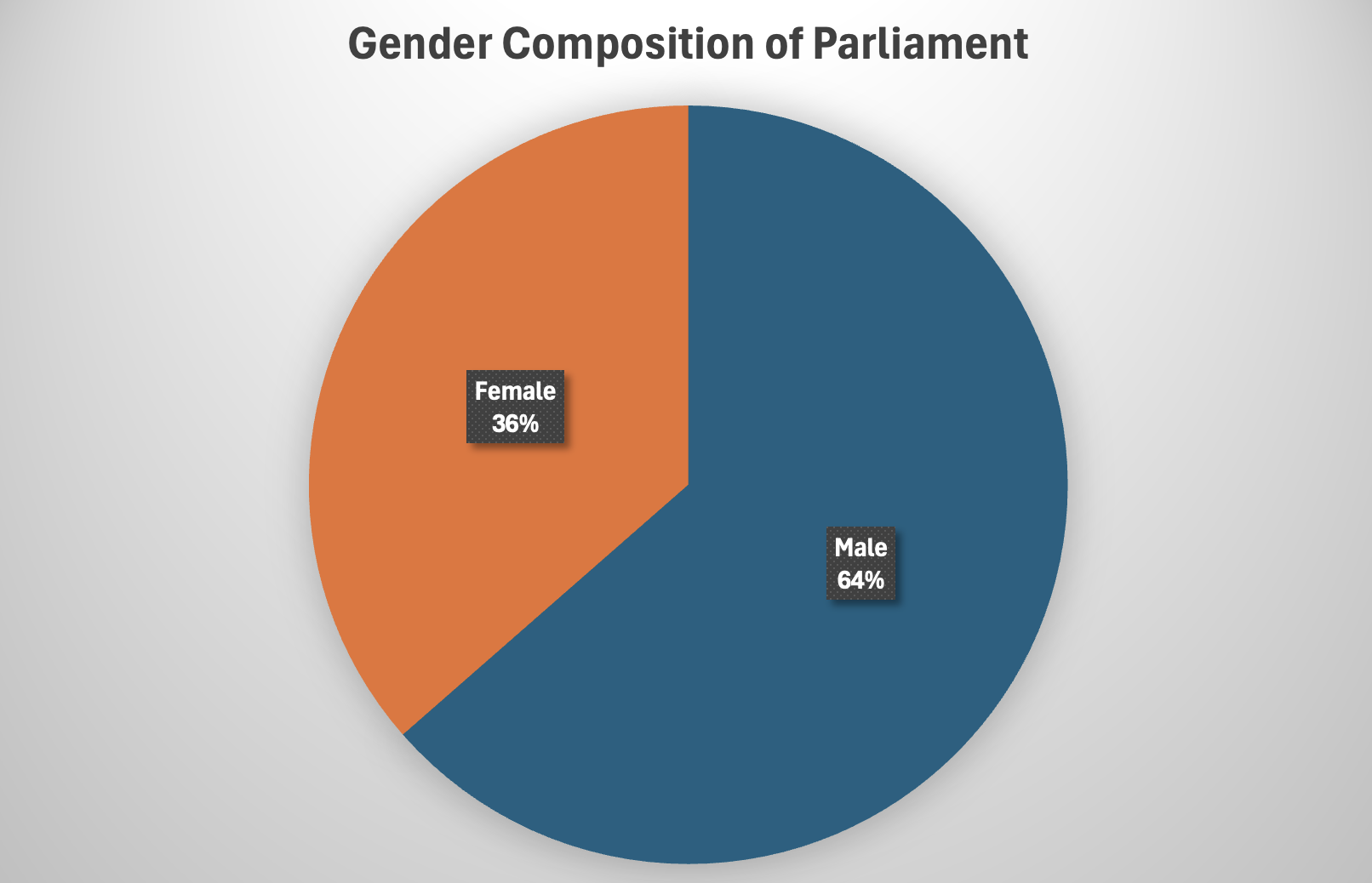
8th National Assembly of Armenia by gender

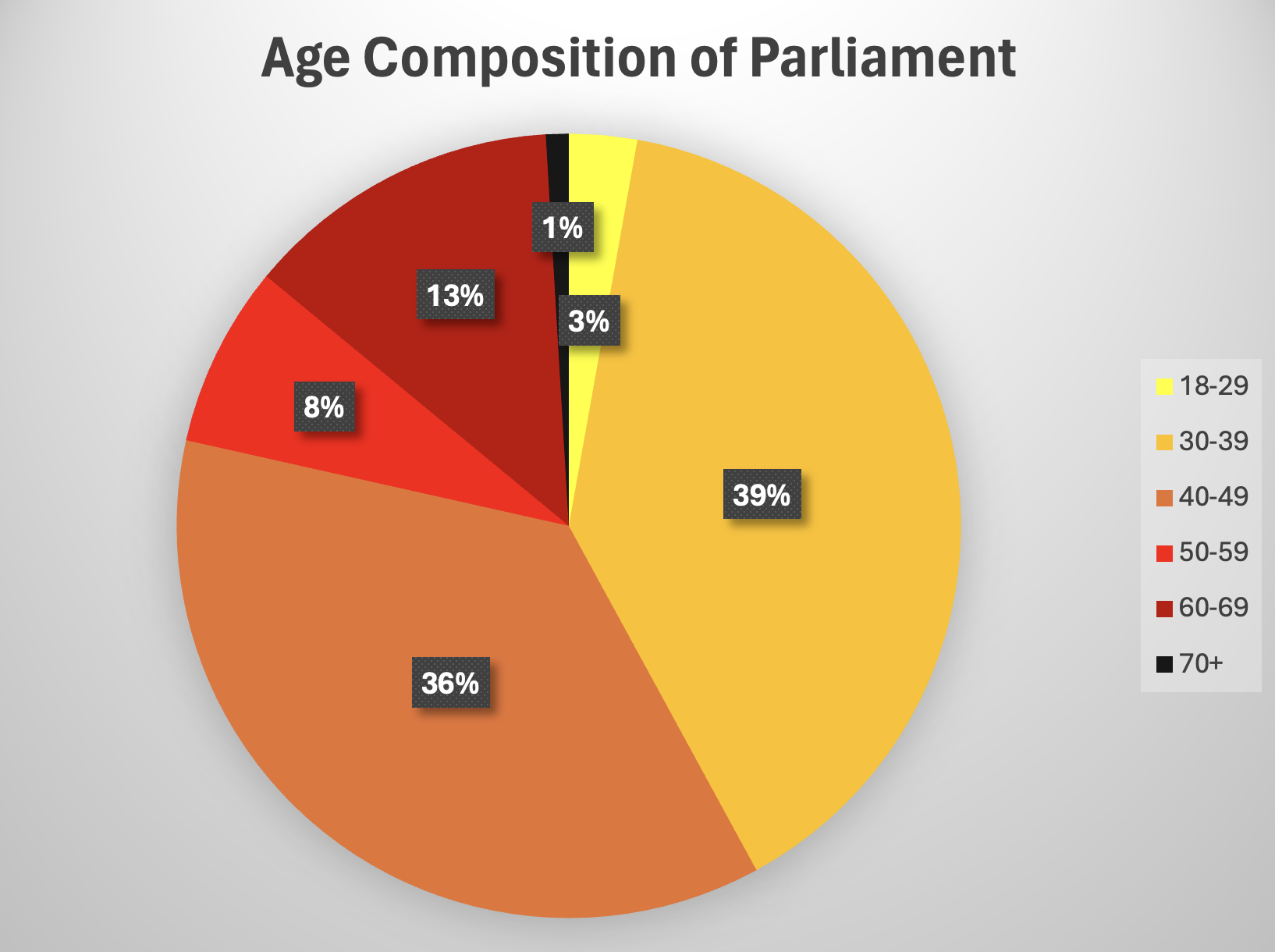
8th National Assembly of Armenia by age groups

This list contains all 107 elected MPs.

Number	Deputy	Party	Group	Birth year	Notes
012	Hayk Konjoryan	Civil Contract	Civil Contract	1987	Parliamentary faction head
052	Artur Hovhannisyan	Civil Contract	Civil Contract	1990	Parliamentary faction secretary
014	Eduard Aghajanyan	Civil Contract	Civil Contract	1988	
054	Hovik Aghazaryan	Civil Contract	Civil Contract	1960	
060	Vahagn Aleksanyan	Civil Contract	Civil Contract	1993	
008	Gurgen Arsenyan	United Labour Party	Civil Contract	1959	
010	Hakob Arshakyan	Civil Contract	Civil Contract	1985	
040	Matevos Asatryan	Civil Contract	Civil Contract	1985	
057	Hakob Aslanyan	Civil Contract	Civil Contract	1954	
055	Narek Babayan	Civil Contract	Civil Contract	1984	
041	Lusine Badalyan	Civil Contract	Civil Contract	1980	
037	Sergey Bagratyan	Independent	Civil Contract	1963	
069	Rustam Bakoyan	Civil Contract	Civil Contract	1986	
026	Zaruhi Batoyan	Civil Contract	Civil Contract	1979	
063	Davit Danielyan	Civil Contract	Civil Contract	1992	
004	Arpine Davoyan	Civil Contract	Civil Contract	1985	
031	Sisak Gabrielyan	Civil Contract	Civil Contract	1988	
029	Vilen Gabrielyan	Civil Contract	Civil Contract	1983	
030	Meri Galstyan	Independent	Civil Contract	1988	
033	Tatevik Gasparyan	Civil Contract	Civil Contract	1983	
062	Narek Ghahramanyan	Civil Contract	Civil Contract	1991	
042	Vahe Ghalumyan	Civil Contract	Civil Contract	1975	
047	Alkhas Ghazaryan	Civil Contract	Civil Contract	1986	
050	Marina Ghazaryan	Civil Contract	Civil Contract	1962	
025	Sona Ghazaryan	Civil Contract	Civil Contract	1993	
038	Taguhi Ghazaryan	Civil Contract	Civil Contract	1991	
022	Hripsime Grigoryan	Civil Contract	Civil Contract	1988	
059	Narek Grigoryan	Civil Contract	Civil Contract	1991	
043	Edgar Hakobyan	Civil Contract	Civil Contract	1985	
061	Hasmik Hakobyan	Civil Contract	Civil Contract	1988	
039	Hrachya Hakobyan	Civil Contract	Civil Contract	1980	
034	Vagharshak Hakobyan	Civil Contract	Civil Contract	1991	
028	Karen Hambardzumyan	Civil Contract	Civil Contract	1982	
071	Knyaz Hasanov	Independent	Civil Contract	1945	
020	Vahagn Hovakimyan	Civil Contract	Civil Contract	1974	
067	Hripsime Hunanyan	Civil Contract	Civil Contract	1982	
013	Arousyak Julhakyan	Civil Contract	Civil Contract	1983	
016	Maria Karapetyan	Civil Contract	Civil Contract	1988	
032	Armen Khachatryan	Civil Contract	Civil Contract	1973	
023	Vigen Khachatryan	Independent	Civil Contract	1951	
066	Sargis Khandanyan	Civil Contract	Civil Contract	1990	
045	Lilit Kirakosyan	Civil Contract	Civil Contract	1988	
015	Andranik Kocharyan	Civil Contract	Civil Contract	1961	
036	Arusyak Manavazyan	Civil Contract	Civil Contract	1986	
009	Gurgen Melkonyan	Independent	Civil Contract	1957	
058	Lilit Minasyan	Civil Contract	Civil Contract	1990	
049	Aren Mkrtchyan	Civil Contract	Civil Contract	1992	
002	Lena Nazaryan	Civil Contract	Civil Contract	1983	
056	Emma Palyan	Civil Contract	Civil Contract	1990	
021	Gevorg Papoyan	Civil Contract	Civil Contract	1987	
044	Kristine Poghosyan	Civil Contract	Civil Contract	1982	
064	Mariam Poghosyan	Civil Contract	Civil Contract	1995	
007	Ruben Rubinyan	Civil Contract	Civil Contract	1990	Vice President of the National Assembly
070	Aleksey Sandikov	Independent	Civil Contract	1983	
035	Hayk Sargsyan	Civil Contract	Civil Contract	1992	
048	Trdat Sargsyan	Civil Contract	Civil Contract	1989	
065	Karen Saroukhanyan	Civil Contract	Civil Contract	1986	
003	Alen Simonyan	Civil Contract	Civil Contract	1980	President of the National Assembly
027	Lilit Stepanyan	Civil Contract	Civil Contract	1981	
001	Khachatur Sukiasyan	Independent	Civil Contract	1961	
011	Heriknaz Tigranyan	Civil Contract	Civil Contract	1972	
005	Arsen Torosyan	Civil Contract	Civil Contract	1982	
018	Shirak Torosyan	Independent	Civil Contract	1972	
068	Hayk Tsirunyan	Civil Contract	Civil Contract	1977	
006	Mikayel Tumasyan	Civil Contract	Civil Contract	1980	
017	Babken Tunyan	Civil Contract	Civil Contract	1980	
019	Tsovinar Vardanyan	Civil Contract	Civil Contract	1980	
024	Vladimir Vardanyan	Civil Contract	Civil Contract	1979	
053	Gayane Yeghiazaryan	Civil Contract	Civil Contract	1975	
046	Arman Yeghoyan	Civil Contract	Civil Contract	1984	
051	Narek Zeynalyan	Civil Contract	Civil Contract	1979	
078	Seyran Ohanyan	Independent	Armenia Alliance	1962	Parliamentary faction head
080	Artsvik Minasyan	Dashnaktsutyun	Armenia Alliance	1972	Parliamentary faction secretary
095	Tadevos Avetisyan	Dashnaktsutyun	Armenia Alliance	1976	
090	Armen Charchyan	Independent	Armenia Alliance	1960	
076	Lilit Galstyan	Dashnaktsutyun	Armenia Alliance	1962	
081	Argishti Gevorgyan	Dashnaktsutyun	Armenia Alliance	1992	
075	Armen Gevorgyan	Independent	Armenia Alliance	1973	
073	Anna Grigoryan	Reborn Armenia	Armenia Alliance	1991	
074	Vahe Hakobyan	Reborn Armenia	Armenia Alliance	1971	
097	Artur Khachatryan	Dashnaktsutyun	Armenia Alliance	1972	
085	Agnesa Khamoyan	Independent	Armenia Alliance	1990	
091	Yelena Kirakosyan	Reborn Armenia	Armenia Alliance	1980	
092	Aspram Krpeyan	Independent	Armenia Alliance	1990	
093	Armenouhi Kyureghyan	Dashnaktsutyun	Armenia Alliance	1963	
098	Aregnaz Manukyan	Independent	Armenia Alliance	1980	
083	Gegham Manukyan	Dashnaktsutyun	Armenia Alliance	1970	
100	Zemfira Mirzoeva	Independent	Armenia Alliance	1995	
099	Gegham Nazaryan	Independent	Armenia Alliance	1971	
077	Armen Rustamyan	Dashnaktsutyun	Armenia Alliance	1960	
072	Ishkhan Saghatelyan	Dashnaktsutyun	Armenia Alliance	1982	
096	Artur Sargsyan	Reborn Armenia	Armenia Alliance	1978	
089	Ashot Simonyan	Dashnaktsutyun	Armenia Alliance	1980	
088	Hripsime Stambulyan	Reborn Armenia	Armenia Alliance	1983	
086	Andranik Tevanyan	Independent	Armenia Alliance	1974	
084	Aghvan Vardanyan	Independent	Armenia Alliance	1958	
079	Elinar Vardanyan	Independent	Armenia Alliance	1978	
082	Kristine Vardanyan	Dashnaktsutyun	Armenia Alliance	1993	
094	Aram Vardevanyan	Independent	Armenia Alliance	1989	
097	Mkhitar Zakaryan	Reborn Armenia	Armenia Alliance	1971	
105	Hayk Mamijanyan	Republican Party	I Have Honor Alliance	1990	Parliamentary faction head
107	Tigran Abrahamyan	Republican Party	I Have Honor Alliance	1985	Parliamentary faction secretary
101	Martun Grigoryan	Independent	I Have Honor Alliance	1981	
102	Taron Margaryan	Republican Party	I Have Honor Alliance	1978	
103	Anna Mkrtchyan	Republican Party	I Have Honor Alliance	1994	
106	Taguhi Tovmasyan	Independent	I Have Honor Alliance	1982	
104	Ishkhan Zakaryan	Homeland Party	Independent	1961	

== See also ==
- Government of Armenia
- Politics of Armenia
