= Poghossian =

Poghossian, Pogossyan, Poghosyan, Poghosian, Pogosyan, etc., (Armenian: Պողոսյան) is an Armenian surname. Also Ter-Pogossian, Der-Pogossian, and variants. Ter/Der indicates priesthood descent. The Western Armenian equivalent is Boghossyan. It is a patronymic from the first name Poghos (Armenian: Պողոս), equivalent to Paul, making the name effectively equivalent to Paulson. It may refer to:

- Ana Poghosian (born 1984), Georgian rugby union and association football player
- Ani Poghosyan (born 2000), Armenian swimmer
- Ann Ter-Pogossian (1932–2022), American artist
- Armen Poghosyan (conductor) (born 1974), Russian conductor
- Armen Poghosyan (military musician), Armenian military musician
- David Pogosian (born 1974), Olympic wrestler
- Davit Poghosyan, Armenian curator
- Garegin Poghosyan (born 1982), Armenian military personnel
- Genrikh Poghosyan, Soviet party leader of the Nagorno-Karabakh Autonomous Oblast
- Gevorik Poghosyan (born 1984), Armenian weightlifter
- Ghukas Poghosyan (born 1994), Armenian footballer
- Gilbert Pogosyan (born 1988), American soccer player
- Hasmik Poghosyan (born 1960), Minister of Culture of Armenia
- Hrachya Poghosyan (born 1999), Armenian Greco-Roman wrestler
- Kariné Poghosyan, Armenian pianist
- Kristine Poghosyan (born 1982), Armenian politician
- Manvel Ter-Pogosyan (born 1987), a.k.a. Amurai, American trance music producer
- Mariam Poghosyan (born 1995), Armenian politician
- Metakse Poghosian (1926–2014), Armenian poet
- Michael Poghosyan (born 1954), Armenian film and theatre actor and judge on the Armenian version of Pop Idol
- Michel Ter-Pogossian (1925–1996), American physicist
- Mihran Poghosyan (born 1976), Armenian businessman
- Mikhail Pogosyan (born 1956), Russian aerospace engineer
- Poghos Poghosyan (c. 1958–2001), killed by President Kocharyan's bodyguards
- Shirak Poghosyan (born 1969), Armenian long jumper
- Sofya Poghosyan (born 1988), Armenian broadcaster, psychologist and actress
- Sona Poghosyan (born 1998), Armenian weightlifter
- Stefan Pogosyan (born 2004), Russian chess master
- Stepan Karapetovich Pogosyan (1932–2012), Armenian politician
- Vardan Pogosyan (born 1992), Armenian-Russian footballer
- Vasilios Poghosyan (born 1998), Greek-Armenian footballer
- Walter Poghosyan (born 1992), Armenian football player
- Yura Poghosyan, a National Hero of Armenia
- Zhirayr Poghosyan (born 1942), Prime Minister of Nagorno-Karabakh
