= Hripsime Grigoryan =

Armenian politician (born 1988)

- Հռիփսիմե Գրիգորյան

Member of the National Assembly of Armenia
- Incumbent
- Assumed office 2018
- Parliamentary group: My Step

Personal details
- Born: 18 September 1988 (age 38) Yerevan, Armenian SSR, Soviet Union
- Party: Civil Contract
- Education: Central European University

Hripsime Grigoryan (born 18 September 1988) is an Armenian politician of the Civil Contact. She is a member of the National Assembly of Armenia since 2018.

== Early life and education ==
Hripsime Grigoryan was born in Yerevan, Soviet Armenia in 1988. From 2005 onwards, she studied international relations and diplomacy at the Yerevan State University from where she graduated with a BSc in 2009. She followed up on her studies at the Central European University in Budapest, Hungary, obtaining a Master's degree in political sciences in 2011. After she deepened her understanding on political processes in seminars of Democracy and Federalization in Switzerland and Sweden, taking part as a research assistant in political science for the "Varieties of Democracy" program of the University of Gothenburg between 2012 and 2017.

== Professional career ==
Between 2013 and 2018, Grigoryan occupied several offices in institutions like the US embassy in Armenia, the Organization for Security and Co-operation in Europe (OSCE) or the Tourism department of the Armenian Ministry of Economic Development.

== Political career ==
Her political interest began to take form as she become a Member of the Armenian Youth Initiative Now in 2008. In December 2018, she was elected into the National Assembly of Armenia in which she became the head of the Tourism Committee. Besides, Grigoryan is an alternate member to the Parliamentary Assembly of the OSCE. In May 2021 it was announced that Grigorian was an electoral candidate for the Civil Contract within the My Step Alliance and was re-elected in the Parliamentary Election of June 2021.
