= Taguhi =

Taguhi (Armenian: Թագուհի) is an Armenian female given name. The name means "queen". Notable people with this name include:

- Taguhi Hakobian (1878-1947), Armenian actress, also known as Hasmik
- Taguhi Ghazaryan (born 1991), Armenian politician
- Taguhi Tovmasyan (born 1982), Armenian politician
