= Lilit Stepanyan =

Armenian politician

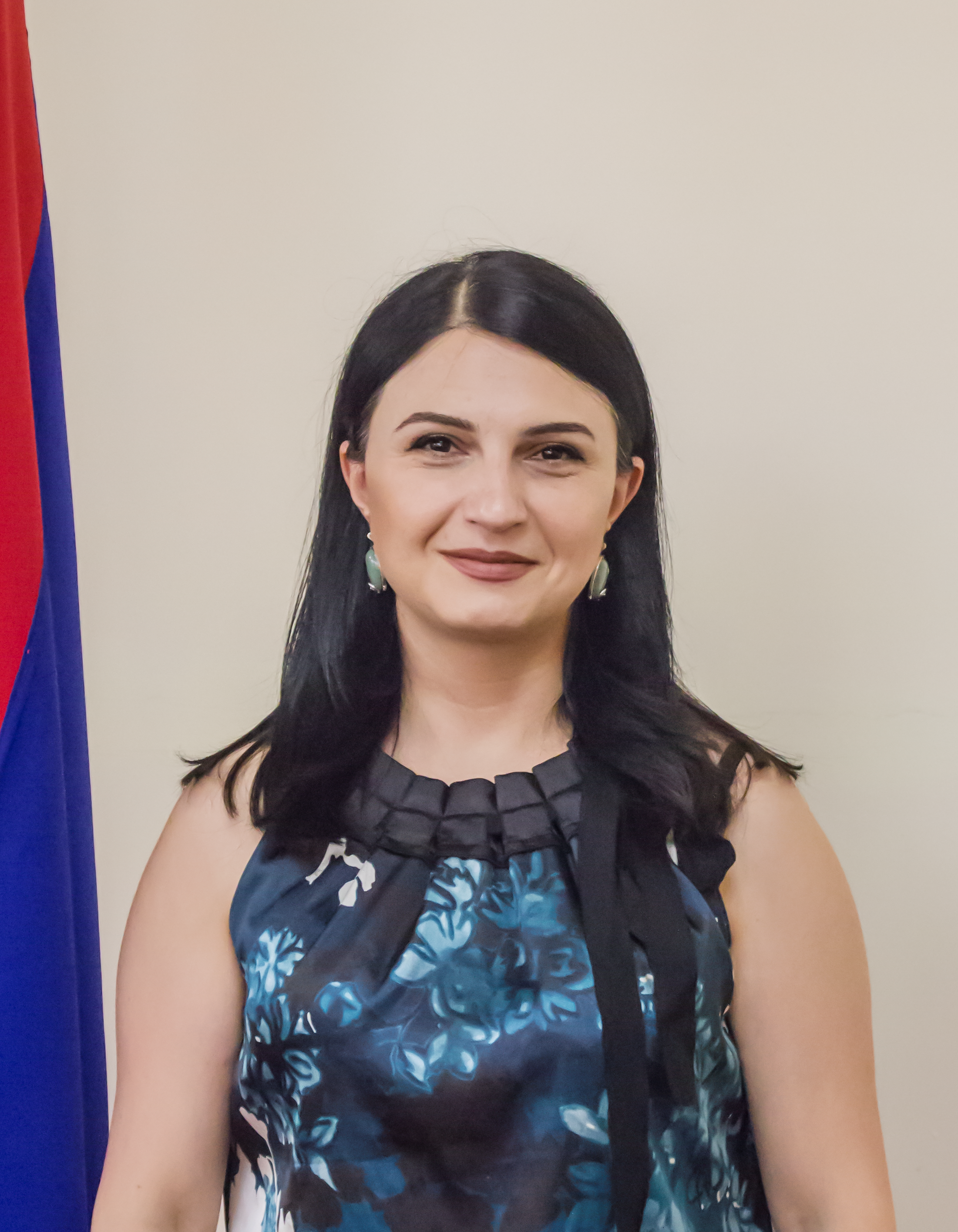

Member of the National Assembly of Armenia
- Incumbent
- Assumed office December 2018

Personal details
- Born: Lilit Stepanyan; 24 March 1981 (age 45) Hrazdan, Kotayk Province, Soviet Armenia
- Citizenship: Armenian
- Education: Yerevan State University

Lilit Stepanyan (Armenian: Լիլիթ Ստեփանյան; born 24 March 1981, Hrazdan, Soviet Armenia) is an Armenian politician and a current member of the Armenian Parliament for the Civil Contract.

== Education ==
She studied International Relations at the Yerevan State University from where she received a Bachelor of Science in 2002 and a master's degree in political sciences in 2004. She took part in several programs organized by the United Nations Development Programme (UNDP) and the United States Agency for International Development (USAID) in Armenia.

== Professional career ==
In 2002 she entered the public administration and was employed in Cadastre division of the Municipality in Hrazdan. Between 2007 and 2018 she served in several positions in the Ministry of Education, becoming the director of the Kotayk branch of the National Institute of Education in 2017 until she assumed as the acting mayor of Hrazdan in July 2018.

== Political career ==
As the elected mayor of Hrazdan Aram Daniyelyan resigned in June 2018, she assumed as the acting mayor of Hrazdan in July 2018. On 21 October 2018 she was confirmed over a popular vote. While being an assistant to Armenian MP Sasun Mikayelyan, she was offered to become an independent candidate for Kotayk in the My Step Alliance, for which she was elected an MP in the Parliamentary elections of December 2018. She was re-elected in the parliamentary elections of 2021, this time for the Civil Contract party.
