= Tsovinar Vardanyan =

Armenian politician (born 1980)

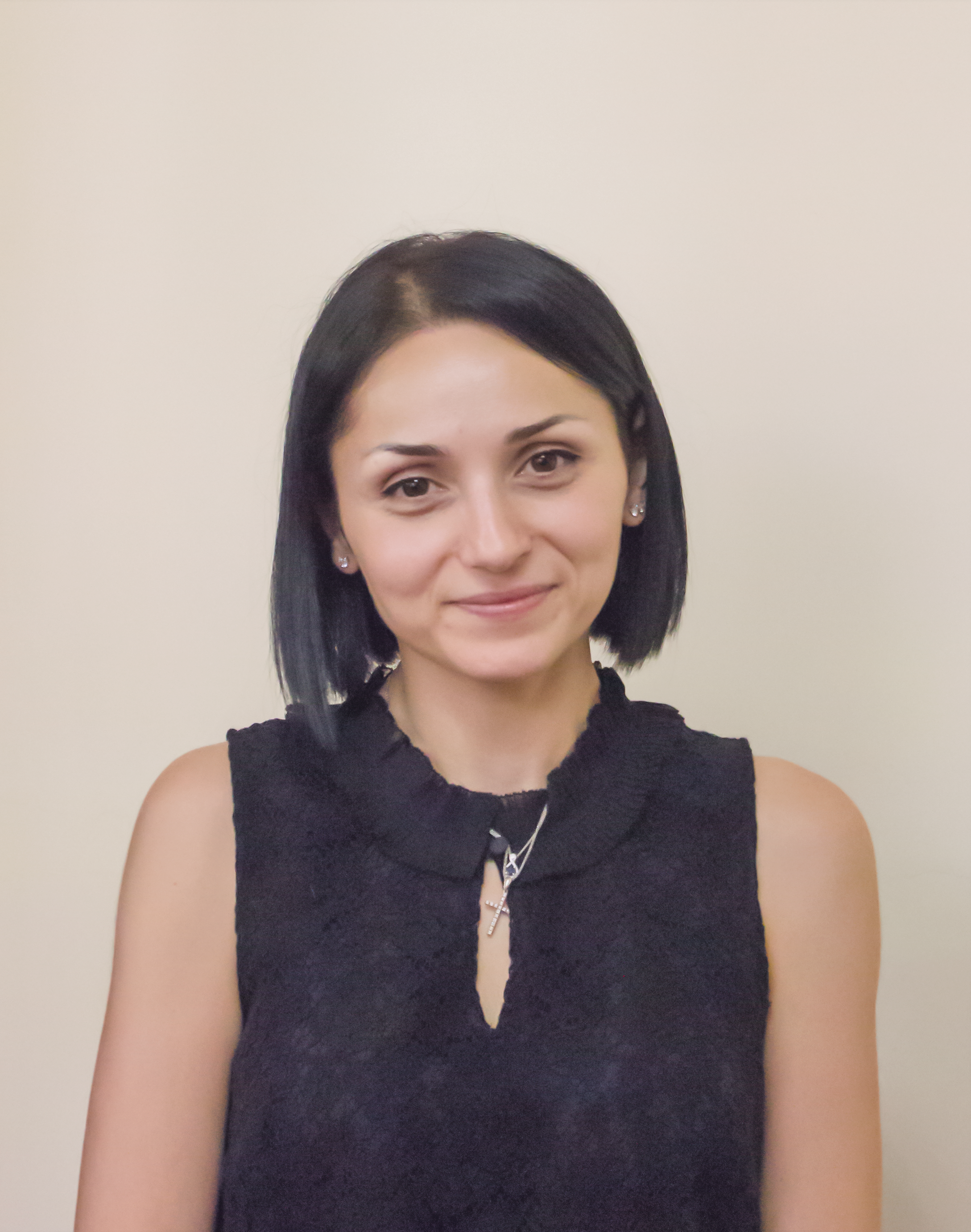

Member of Parliament of the National Assembly of Armenia
- Incumbent
- Assumed office 2018
- Parliamentary group: My Step

Personal details
- Born: 8 September 1980 (age 46) Yerevan, Armenian SSR, Soviet Union
- Education: Yerevan State University

Tsovinar Vardanyan (Armenian: Ծովինար Վարդանյան; born 8 September 1980) is an Armenian economist and politician of the Civil Contract. Since 2018 she is a member of the National Assembly of Armenia.

== Early life and education ==
Tsovinar Vardanyan was born in 1980 in Yerevan, Soviet Armenia. She studied economy at the Yerevan State University from where she graduated with a BSc in 2001 and an MSc in 2003. While studying for her Masters, she was employed in different positions of the Central Bank of Armenia between 2002 and 2003.

== Professional career ==
Between 2006 and 2014 she worked in financial institutions and between 2014 and 2019 she was in the executive leadership of several companies in Armenia.

== Political career ==
She was elected a Member of Parliament in the parliamentary elections of December 2018 for the Civil Contract within the My Step Alliance. In May 2021, she was announced as a candidate for the My Step alliance and was re-elected in the snap parliamentary elections of June 2021.

=== Political positions ===
She was a leading force behind the introduction of paternal leave in Armenia in January 2021.
