= Sona Ghazaryan =

Armenian politician (born 1993)

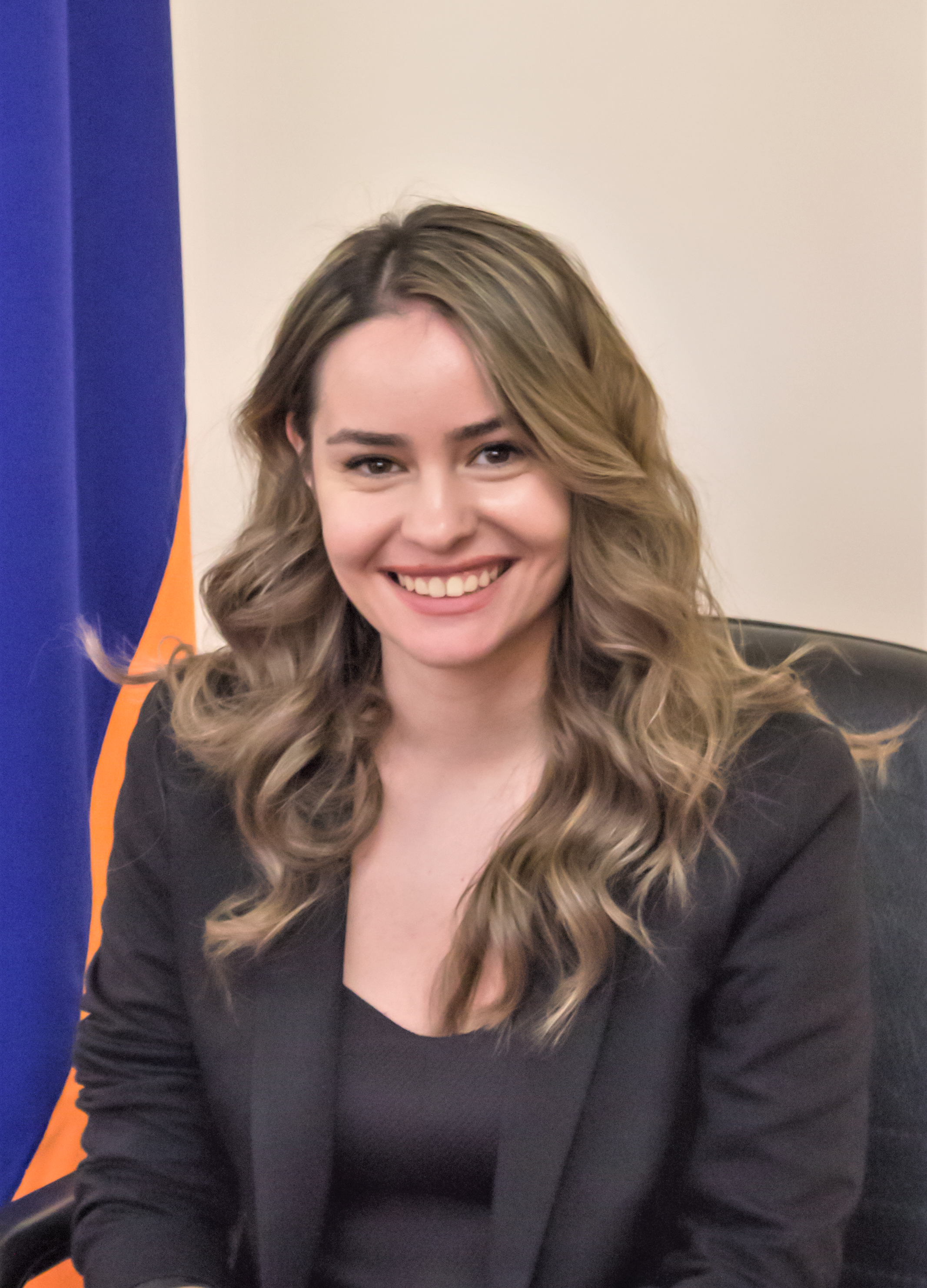

Member of National Assembly
- Incumbent
- Assumed office 14 January 2019

Personal details
- Born: Sona Arayi Ghazaryan; 30 March 1993 (age 33) Yerevan, Armenia
- Party: Civil Contract
- Other political affiliations: My Step Alliance (until 2021)
- Education: Yerevan Brusov State University of Languages and Social Sciences

Sona Arayi Ghazaryan (Armenian: Սոնա Արայի Ղազարյան; born 30 March 1993) is an Armenian politician who has served as a member of the National Assembly since 2019. She is a member of Civil Contract.

== Early life and education ==
Ghazaryan was born on 30 March 1993 in Yerevan. In 2013, she graduated from the Yerevan Brusov State University of Languages and Social Sciences.

== Political career ==
From September 2018 to January 2019, Ghazaryan was a member of the Yerevan City Council.

On 9 December 2018, she was elected to the National Assembly as part of the My Step Alliance. She was re-elected to the National Assembly, this time representing Civil Contract alone, in the 2021 Armenian parliamentary election.

== Personal life ==
Ghazaryan is married and has a child.
