= Maria Karapetyan =

Armenian politician (born 1988)

Maria Karapetyan (born 20 February 1988) is an Armenian politician and a member of the National Assembly of Armenia for the Civil Contract. She has worked as a teacher at the Quality Schools International in Yerevan and was elected to parliament in 2018. She is a feminist and known for her support of the Armenian LGBT community.

== Early life and education ==
Maria Karapetyan was born on 20 February 1988 in Vanadzor, Soviet Armenia. She studied Intercultural Communication at the Yerevan Brusov State University from where she earned a bachelor's degree in 2008 and a master's degree in 2010. She then moved to Rome, Italy, where she studied International Cooperation, Human Rights and Policy of the European Union at the University of Rome between 2013 and 2015. At the same time, she was also accepted as a student of the Cittadella della Pace in Rondine, Arrezzo.

== Professional career ==
After she obtained her BA, she worked as a teacher at the Quality Schools International in Yerevan from 2008 until 2013. Between 2011 and 2018 she took part in the editorial board for the Journal of Conflict Transformation's Caucasus Edition.

== Political career ==
Karapetyan's political activism began with her opposition to Serge Sargsyan. At night, together with a group of political activists she sprayed the slogan Reject Serzh on prominent streets in Yerevan in support of the Armenian Revolution of 2018. She became known for her so-called Sisters speech in which she advocated for equal rights for women and men on the Republic Square in Yerevan. In the parliamentary election of December 2018, she was elected as a candidate of the Civil Contract within the My Step Alliance.
