= Armen Poghosyan =

Armen Poghosyan may refer to:

- Armen Poghosyan (conductor) (born 1974)
- Armen Poghosyan (military musician) (born 1965)
