= Arman Bosyan =

Armenian politician (born 1986)

MP of the National Assembly of Armenia List of members of the 7th National Assembly of Armenia 7th Convocation
- Incumbent
- Assumed office January 10, 2019

Head of Social Security Service
- In office June 15, 2018 – January 10, 2019

Arman Boshyan (August 9, 1986 (age 40), is an Armenian politician and a member of the 7th convocation of the National Assembly of Armenia. He is a member of the "My Step Alliance" faction.

== Biography ==
He was born on August 9, 1986, in Taganrog, Russia.

=== Education ===
In 2003 he graduated from Chkalov Secondary School in the Nikopol district of the Dnipropetrovsk region, Ukraine.

From 2007 to 2009 he studied at the State Energy College in Abovyan specializing in accounting and auditing.

From 2009 to 2014 he studied at the State Engineering University of Armenia, specializing in the economics and management of telecommunications enterprises. He obtained a bachelor's degree.

=== Career ===
From 2007 to 2008 he worked at "Haypost" CJSC as a postal escort.

From 2008 to 2010 he served as the head of the Byureghavan postal branch of "Haypost" CJSC.

From 2012 to 2016 he worked as chief accountant at "Gasprint" LLC.

From 2014 to 2015 he worked as an accountant at the "Civil Contract" Return Fund.

From 2017 to 2018 he worked as the office manager at the Children's Support Center of the Armenian Relief Fund.

From June 15, 2018, to January 9, 2019, by order of the Prime Minister of Armenia, Nikol Pashinyan, he was appointed as the Head of the Social Security Service.

=== Political Activity ===
In 2013 he was one of the co-founders of the "Civil Contract" public-political union.

In 2015 he became a founding member of the "Civil Contract" party, formed on the basis of the public-political union of the same name.

On June 16, 2019, during the 5th Congress of the "Civil Contract Party", he was elected as a member of the governing board.
