= Aleksey Sandikov =

Armenian politician (born 1983)

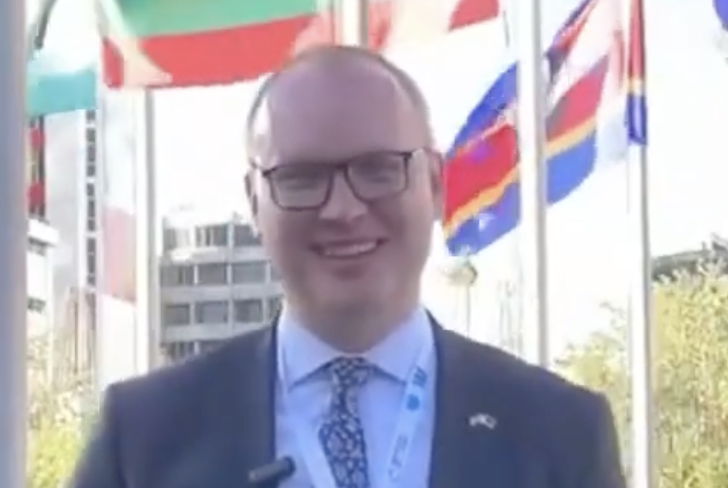

Member of National Assembly
- Incumbent
- Assumed office 14 January 2019

Personal details
- Born: Aleksey Ivani Sandikov; 23 July 1983 (age 43) Yerevan, Armenian SSR, USSR
- Other political affiliations: My Step Alliance (until 2021)
- Education: Armenian State University of Economics; Russian-Armenian University

Aleksey Ivani Sandikov (Armenian: Ալեքսեյ Իվանի Սանդիկով, Russian: Алексе́й Ива́нович Санды́ков; born 23 July 1983) is an Armenian politician. He has served as a member of the National Assembly since 2019.

== Early life and education ==
Sandikov was born on 23 July 1983 in Yerevan. In 2004, he graduated from the Armenian State University of Economics with a degree in marketing, and in 2007, he graduated from graduate school at the Russian-Armenian University.

== Professional career ==
After graduating in 2007, Sandikov began working in the Ministry of Defense, where he remained until 2014. He continued his career in the field of information technology.

== Political career ==
On 9 December 2018, Sandikov was elected to the National Assembly as part of the My Step Alliance electoral list, albeit as an independent. In the 2021 parliamentary election, he was re-elected to the National Assembly, this time as part of the Civil Contract electoral list. In the seventh and eighth convocations of the NA, he represents the Russian minority.

== Personal life ==
Sandikov is married and has three children.
