= Vahagn Hovakimyan =

Armenian politician, lawyer, journalist

- Վահագն Հովակիմյան

Member of the National Assembly of Armenia
- In office January 14, 2019 – August 2, 2021

Member of the National Assembly of Armenia
- In office August 2, 2021 – October 12, 2022

President of the Central Electoral Commission of Armenia
- In office October 11, 2022 – Present

Personal details
- Born: June 30, 1974 (age 52) Yerevan, Armenian SSR
- Party: Civil Contract
- Education: Yerevan State University

Vahagn Hovakimyan (Armenian: Վահագն Հովակիմյան; born 1974), is an Armenian politician, lawyer, journalist, and member of the Civil Contract party. He served as a member of the National Assembly of Armenia from January 14, 2019, to October 12, 2022. He is currently serving as the President of the Central Electoral Commission of Armenia since October 11, 2022.

== Education ==
From 1991 to 1993, he studied at the Faculty of Radio Physics of Yerevan State University but did not complete his university education. He then joined the Armed Forces of Armenia from 1993 to 1995. From 1996 to 2000, he studied sociology, psychology, political science, and philosophy at Yerevan State University.

=== Political career ===
In the 2018 Yerevan City Council elections held on September 23, he was elected as a member of the My Step Alliance. He resigned from the mandate on October 10.

On December 9, 2018, he was elected as a member of the My Step Alliance in the 2018 Armenian parliamentary elections.

In the parliamentary elections of 2019 held on June 16, during the 5th convocation of the Civil Contract party, he was elected as a member of the executive body of the party.

In the 2021 Armenian parliamentary elections held on June 20, he was elected as a member of the Civil Contract party.

In the 2022 Armenian parliamentary elections held on October 7, he was elected as the president of the Central Electoral Commission by the National Assembly of Armenia.
