= Ruben Rubinyan =

Armenian politician (born 1990)

- Ռուբեն Ռուբինյան

President of the National Assembly of Armenia
- Incumbent
- Assumed office 3 August 2026
- President: Vahagn Khachaturyan
- Preceded by: Alen Simonyan

Vice President of National Assembly of Armenia
- In office 3 August 2021 – 2 August 2026 Serving with Hakob Arshakyan
- President: Alen Simonyan
- Preceded by: Alen Simonyan; Lena Nazaryan; Vahe Enfiajyan

Member of the National Assembly
- Incumbent
- Assumed office 14 January 2019

Personal details
- Born: 8 March 1990 (age 36) Yerevan, Armenian SSR, Soviet Union
- Party: Civil Contract
- Education: Yerevan State University

Ruben Rubinyan (Armenian: Ռուբեն Ռուբինյան; born 8 March 1990) is an Armenian politician who has been president of the National Assembly of Armenia since 2026. From 2021 to 2026, he was vice president of the National Assembly.

== Early life and education ==
Ruben Rubinyan was born in Yerevan, Armenian Soviet Socialist Republic, on 8 March 1990, to Karapet Rubinyan, who later served as vice president of the National Assembly. He graduated from Yerevan State University in 2010, the University College London with a Master's degree in politics and security, and from Jagiellonian University with a Master's degree in European studies. From 2012 to 2014, he served in the Armed Forces of Armenia.

Rubinyan worked as an intern at the United Nations High Commissioner for Refugees. He conducted academic research in Istanbul as part of a program of the Hrant Dink Foundation from 2017 to 2018.

== Career ==
Rubinyan was Deputy Minister of Foreign Affairs from 2018 to 2019. From 2022 to 2026, Rubinyan was Armenia's special envoy for normalizing relations with Turkey.

Rubinyan was elected to the National Assembly in the 2018 election as a member of the My Step Alliance. Rubinyan was a founding member of Civil Contract and reelected to the National Assembly in 2021. During his tenure he served as chair of the Foreign Relations committee.

Rubinyan was elected vice president of the National Assembly on 3 August 2021. He was elected President by a vote of 63 to 28 on 3 August 2026; he is the youngest person to hold the position.

== Personal life ==
Rubinyan is married and is the father of one child.

== Works cited ==
=== News ===
- Ghazanchyan, Siranush (3 August 2026). "Ruben Rubinyan elected Speaker of Armenia's 9th National Assembly". Public Radio of Armenia. Archived from the original on 7 November 2026.

=== Web ===
- "Ruben Rubinyan". National Assembly. Archived from the original on 7 November 2026.
- Anikst, Olivia (11 August 2026). "Ruben Rubinyan: Armenia's Youngest Speaker, and the Man Who has Been Talking to Turkey". Center for Youth Policy. Archived from the original on 7 November 2026.
