= Sukiasyan =

Sukiasyan (Armenian: Սուքիասյան) is an Armenian surname. Notable people with the surname include:

- Khachatur Sukiasyan (born 1961), Armenian politician
- Varuzhan Sukiasyan (born 1956), Armenian football manager
- Yervand Sukiasyan (born 1967), Armenian football player
