= Kristine Poghosyan =

Armenian politician

Kristine Poghosyan Քրիստինե Պողոսյան
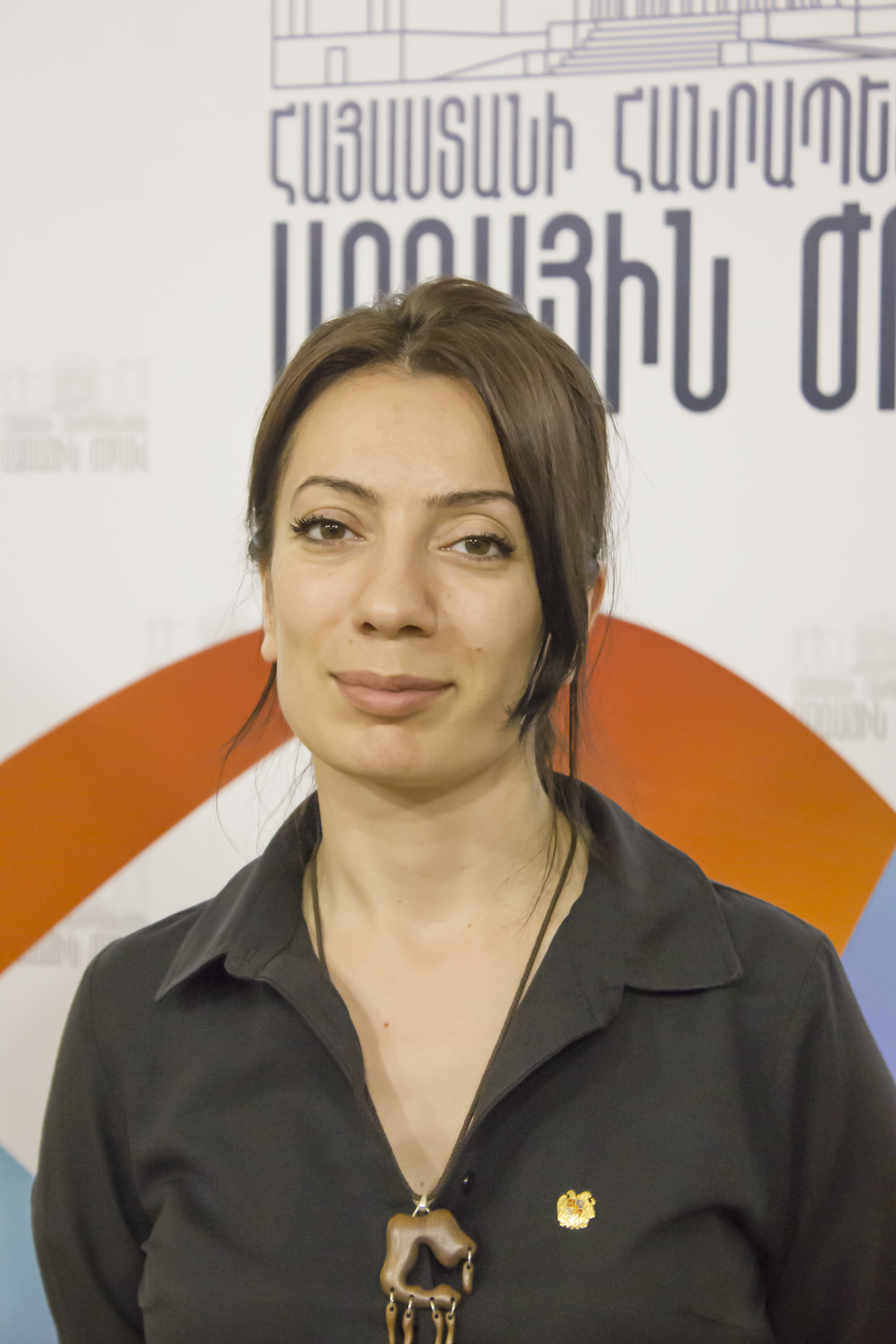

Member of the National Assembly of Armenia
- Incumbent
- Assumed office 2018
- Parliamentary group: My Step

Personal details
- Born: September 27, 1982 (age 43) Ptghni, Kotayk Province, Soviet Armenia
- Party: Civil Contract
- Occupation: Politician

Kristine Poghosyan (Armenian: Քրիստինե Պողոսյան; born 27 September 1982) is an Armenian politician and member of the National Assembly of Armenia for the Civil Contract.

== Early life and education ==
Kristine Poghosyan was born in Ptghni, Kotayk Province, Soviet Armenia on 27 September 1982. She studied Cybernetics at the National Polytechnic University of Armenia and graduated in 2003. She followed up on her studies and obtained a second degree from the same university in Humanitarian and Economic Management in 2007.

== Professional career ==
Her professional career began in the Human Resources department of the Yerevan Brandy Company, of which she was the director between 2005 and 2007. In 2007 she transferred to the Imex Group for which she was also responsible for the Human Resources until 2010. In 2013 she was involved in the founding of the jewelry company Tre Gufo for which she acted as its director until 2018.

== Political career ==
In May 2018 she assumed a position as an assistant for the First Deputy Prime Minister. She resigned in January 2019 after she was elected to the National Assembly of Armenia in the Parliamentary elections of December 2018 representing the Civil Contract. She is a supporter of the LGBT community of Armenia as well as the improvement of the inter-parliamentarian cooperation between the parliaments of Nagorno Karabakh and Armenia.

== Personal life ==
Kristine Poghosyan is married and has three children.
