= Sargis Khandanyan =

Armenian politician (born 1990)

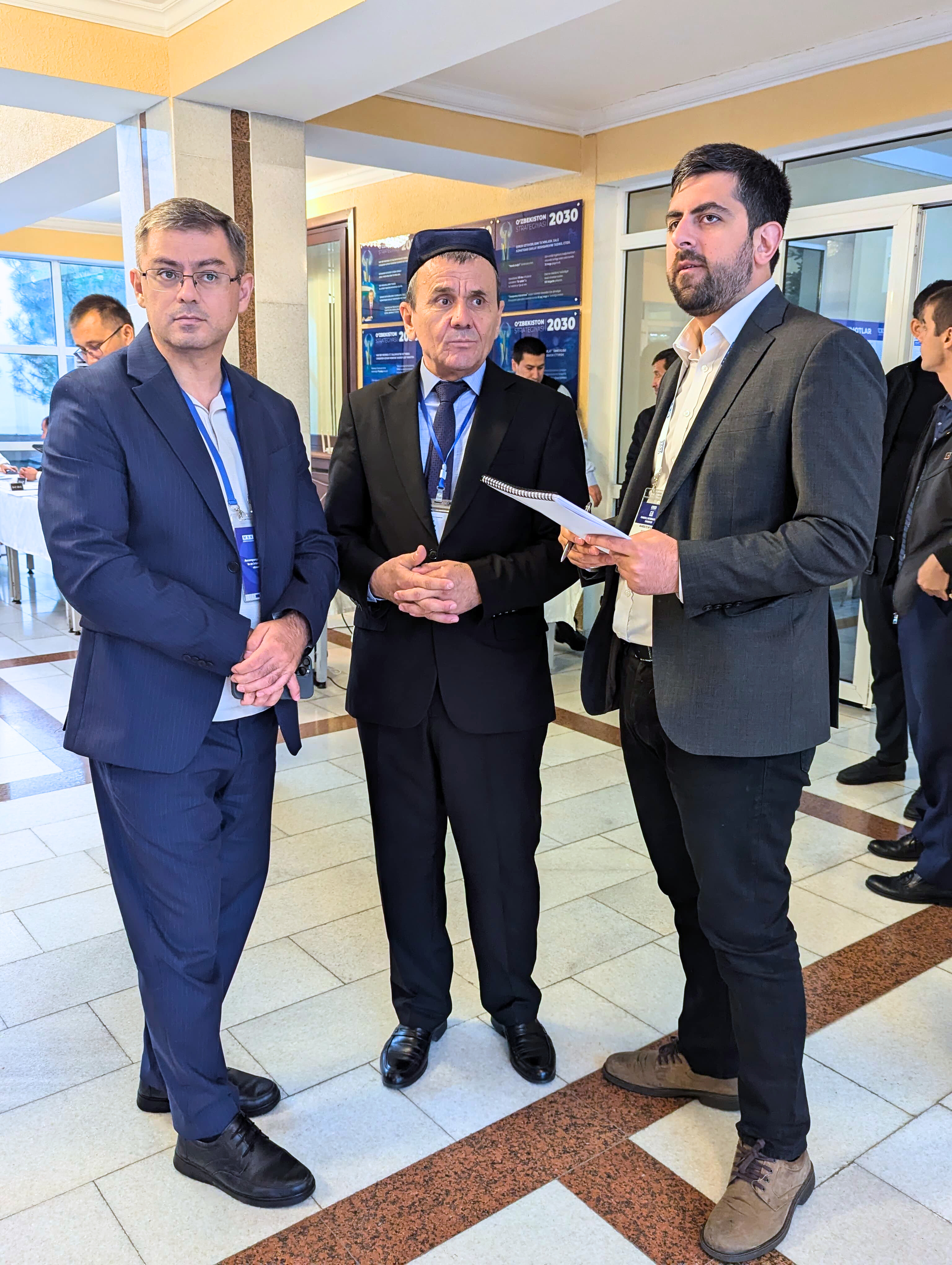
- Khandanyan in 2024

Member of the National Assembly
- Incumbent
- Assumed office 14 January 2019

Personal details
- Born: 24 June 1990 (age 35)
- Party: Civil Contract

Sargis Khandanyan (Armenian: Սարգիս Խանդանյան; born 24 June 1990) is an Armenian politician serving as a member of the National Assembly since 2019. He has served as chairman of the standing committee on foreign relations since 2023.
