= Boghos =

Boghos is an Armenian given name equivalent to Paul. In Eastern Armenian it is translated as Poghos. Notable people with the name include:

== Given name ==
=== Boghos ===
- Andon Boghos Çelebi (1604–1674), Armenian merchant magnate, Ottoman and Tuscan official
- Boghos Nubar (1851–1930), Armenian politician and leader
- Boghos Yousefian (1775–1844), Armenian merchant, administrator and customs official
- Avedis Boghos Derounian (1909–1991), Armenian-American journalist and author
- Steven Boghos Derounian (1918–2007), Armenian-American politician
- Boghos Lévon Zékiyan (born 1943), Armenian scholar, linguist and philosopher

=== Poghos ===
- Poghos Bek-Pirumyan (1856–1921), Armenian Russian commander
- Poghos Galstyan (born 1961), Armenian footballer and manager
- Poghos Ignatosian (born 1920), American bureaucrat of Armenian descent
- Poghos Poghosyan (1958–2001), Armenian murder victim
- Nikoghayos Poghos Mikaelian (1883–1915), Armenian revolutionary and fedayi in the Ottoman Empire

== See also ==
- Sourp Boghos chapel, Nicosia; church in Nicosia, Cyprus
- Surb Poghos-Petros, Yerevan, church in Yerevan, Armenia
- Surp Bogos Church, Armenian Catholic church in Istanbul
- Boghossian, surname derived from the name
