= Heriknaz Tigranyan =

Armenian politician

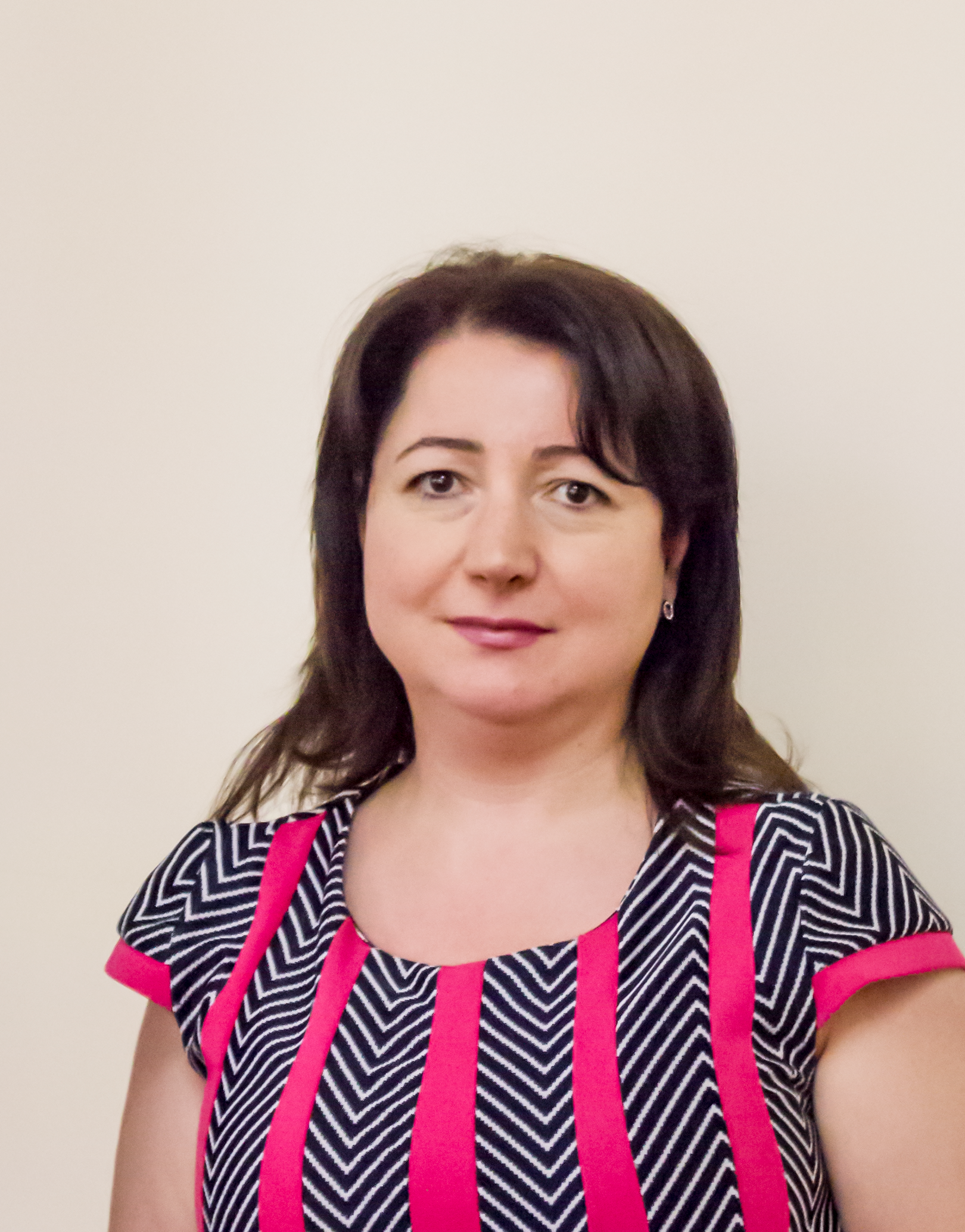

Member of the National Assembly
- Incumbent
- Assumed office 14 January 2019

Personal details
- Born: December 12, 1971 (age 54) Pshatavan, Armenian SSR, Soviet Union
- Party: My Step Alliance
- Education: Yerevan State University

Heriknaz Tigranyan (Armenian: Հերիքնազ Տիգրանյան; born 12 December 1971) is an Armenian politician, lawyer, and educator who currently serves in the National Assembly.

== Early life ==
Heriknaz Tigranyan was born on 12 December 1971, in Pshatavan, Armenian Soviet Socialist Republic. She graduated from the Yerevan State University with a law degree in 1996.

== Career ==
From 1996–2001, Tigranyan served as the head lawyer of the Armenian Language Inspectorate. She served as the chief specialist for the Legal Control Department of the Armenian Labor Inspectorate for the Ministry of Labor and Social Affairs, as the head of the Human Resources Department for the Ministry of Diaspora, and as the legal counselor for Anti-Corruption Center Transparency International, a non-governmental organization.

Tigranyan has worked as a lecturer at the State Engineering University of Armenia, Police Academy of Armenia, Law Institute of the Ministry of Justice of Armenia, and the Law School of Advocates of Armenia. She has also worked as a civic trainer for the International Foundation for Electoral Systems and the non-government organization Center for Public Dialogues and Initiatives.

=== National Assembly ===
On 9 December 2018, Tigranyan was elected to the National Assembly as a member of the My Step Alliance. During her tenure in the National Assembly she has served on the Standing Committee on Health Care and Social Affairs and as deputy chair of the committee. From 17–20 February 2020, she served as a member of an Armenian delegation led by Ararat Mirzoyan to Denmark.
