= Karapet Rubinyan =

Armenian politician and public figure

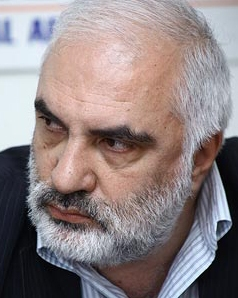

Vice President of the National Assembly of Armenia
- In office 1995–1998

Personal details
- Born: Karapet Rubinyan; September 14, 1957 (age 69) Yerevan, Armenian SSR
- Party: Pan-Armenian National Movement, (1989-2010; 2013-2015)
- Children: Levon (born 1982); Ruben (born 1990); Mariam Luce (born 2014)
- Education: State Engineering University
- Profession: Electrical engineer
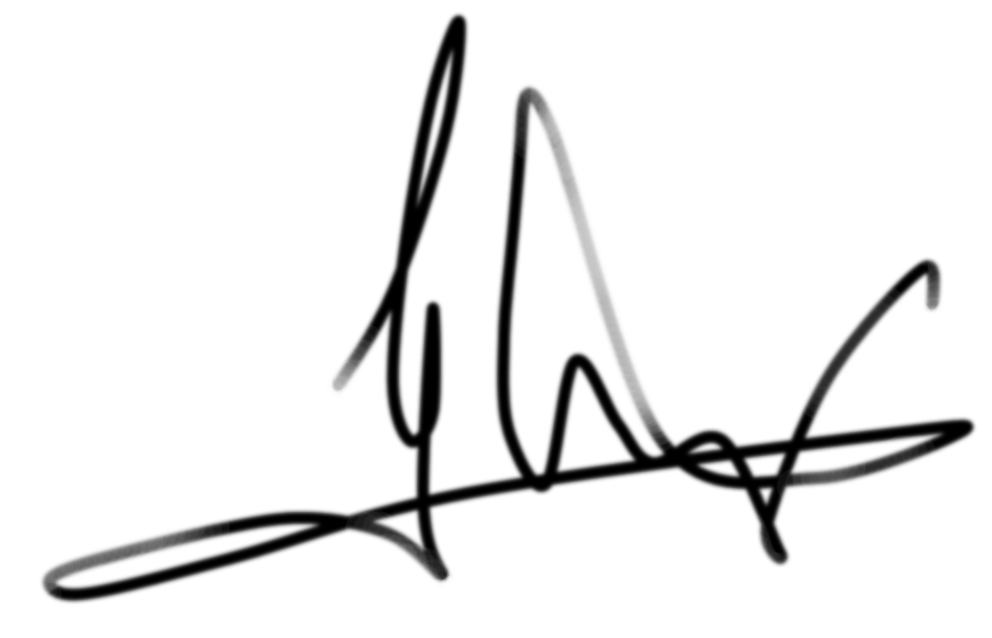
- Signature
- Website: karapet.rubinyan.com

Karapet Rubeni Rubinyan (Armenian: Կարապետ Ռուբենի Ռուբինյան; born 14 September 1957) is an Armenian politician and public figure. He was the Vice-President of the National Assembly of Armenia from 1995-1998), former vice-mayor of Yerevan (1992-1993), former mayor of Shengavit district of Yerevan (1991-1992). He was also a member of the Pan-Armenian National Movement party executive committee from 1991-1998.

== Early life, education and career ==
He was born on September 14, 1957, in Yerevan, Armenian SSR to Ruben Rubinyan (1923-1999) and Mariam Karapetyan (1924-2012). He attended basic school no. 38 named after Vissarion Belinsky in Yerevan, Armenian SSR. He received higher education at State Engineering University of Armenia which joined in 1974 and graduated as an electrical engineer in 1979. From 1979-1991, he worked at “Hayhastoc” scientific manufacturing complex as an engineer, at “VNIIStandardelectro” institute's Armenian branch as a senior engineer, at “Transistor” scientific manufacturing complex as a senior engineer, first- rank engineer- constructor, a sector manager, then as head of an Information and Computing Center.

== Entry to politics ==
As of 1988, he became an active contributor in the “Karabakh movement” and afterwards in the ”Pan-Armenian National Movement”, “HHSh”. From 1989–1990, as a member of “Transistor”’s volunteer squad, he participated in the defense operations of Blutan village of Hadrout area, in Nagorno-Karabakh Republic. From 1991-1999, he was uninterruptedly elected a member of the executive committee of the Pan-Armenian National Movement. In 1990, he was elected a deputy of the Supreme Council of Armenia and worked at the Standing Committee on Local Self-Government.

In January 1991, he was elected the head of the Local Council of Shengavit district of Yerevan. In June 1992, he was appointed deputy head of the Executive Committee of Yerevan City Council, but in December he resigned from the post. The decision was related to the resignation of the head of the Executive Committee of Yerevan City Council Hambardzum Galstyan. In January 1993, by presidential decree, he was appointed the head of the Armenian Presidential Supervisory Service.

=== National Assembly ===
In 1995, he was elected a member of the National Assembly of Armenia. In July 1995, he was elected the Vice-President of the National Assembly of Armenia. In June 1997, in the General Assembly of the Parliamentary Assembly of the Organization of the Black Sea Economic Cooperation (OBSEC), being the head of Armenian parliamentary delegation, he was elected the vice-president of the OBSEC.

In February 1998, he resigned from his post as the vice-chairman of the National Assembly, and was integrated in the Armenian National Assembly’s Standing Committee on Financial-Credit and Budgetary Affairs. In the same period, he stopped his membership in the Pan-Armenian National Movement executive committee, as a consequence to having disputes with Pan-Armenian National Movement executive committee chairman Levon Ter-Petrosyan over principles and for disagreeing on the adopted course. On December 22, he was elected head of Pan-Armenian National Movement council of Shengavit district.

== Later career ==
On January 16, 1999, with a group of supporters, he founded “EuroWay” NGO and was elected the board director of that organization. In May, with a group of supporters, he founded “Armat”, The Center for Democracy and Civil society. In 2006, with a group of supporters, he established the Civil Disobedience Movement. In 2007, he actively participated in the presidential campaign of Levon Ter-Petrosyan as deputy chief of Shengavit district pre-electorate precinct. In 2008, he participated in the nationwide protests which followed the rigged presidential election in Armenia. After the massacre of the peaceful demonstrators on March 1, he was arrested on March 3, on false accusations of plotting to seize power. He was kept in custody for 71 days at “Yerevan-Center” jail (KGB). In May, with a group of supporters, he established the Committee for defense of political prisoners and politically harassed. In summer, he joined the newly formed Armenian National Congress. In 2009, in Yerevan City Council elections, without being a candidate, he actively participated in the electoral campaign of the Armenian National Congress as deputy chief of Shengavit precinct.

In July 2010, after the Pan-Armenian National Movement’s congress, in an open letter addressed to the party’s members, he announced that he quit the Pan-Armenian National Movement party (HHSh). In January 2011, he initiated “The Online Liberals’ Alliance”, “3Ա”. On April 15, he informed the Armenian National Congress that he stopped his membership to it. Since September 2011, he corresponds to "eJournal.am", an electronic journal. In March 2012, in the Armenian National Assembly’s elections, he was invited by the liberal political party Heritage and the Free Democrats parties to join the Heritage’s proportional list, which included members from the two mentioned parties and representatives from the public sector. He also joined the electoral precinct team of the Heritage (Armenia) as a political consultant.

== Personal life ==
Children, 2 boys: Levon (1982) and Ruben (1990).

== See also ==
- Personal site https://rubinyan.wordpress.com/^{(in Armenian)}
