= Boghossian =

Boghossian, Bogossyan, Boghosian, Bogosyan, etc. (Armenian: Բողոսյան) is an Armenian surname, particularly associated with Western Armenia. The Eastern Armenian equivalent is Poghossyan. It is a patronymic from the first name Boghos (Armenian: Պողոս), equivalent to Paul, making the name effectively equivalent to Paulson (English).

Notable people with the name include:

- Alain Boghossian, French-Armenian former football player and assistant coach for the French national team.
- Paul Boghossian, professor of philosophy at New York University
- Peter Boghossian, former professor of philosophy at Portland State University
- Joaquín Boghossian, Uruguayan professional footballer
- Alexander Boghossian, Armenian Ethiopian painter and art teacher
- Edward K. Boghosian, founder of Armenian Reporter newspaper
- Sam Boghosian, American-Armenian football player and coach
- Zach Bogosian, American-Armenian professional ice hockey player
- Eric Bogosian, American-Armenian actor, playwright, monologist, and novelist
- Raffi Boghosyan, Bulgarian-Armenian singer, winner of the first series of Bulgarian X Factor
- Vartan Waldir Boghossian (born 1940), Brazilian Armenian Catholic bishop
