= Arpine Davoyan =

Armenian politician (born 1985)

- Արփինե Դավոյան
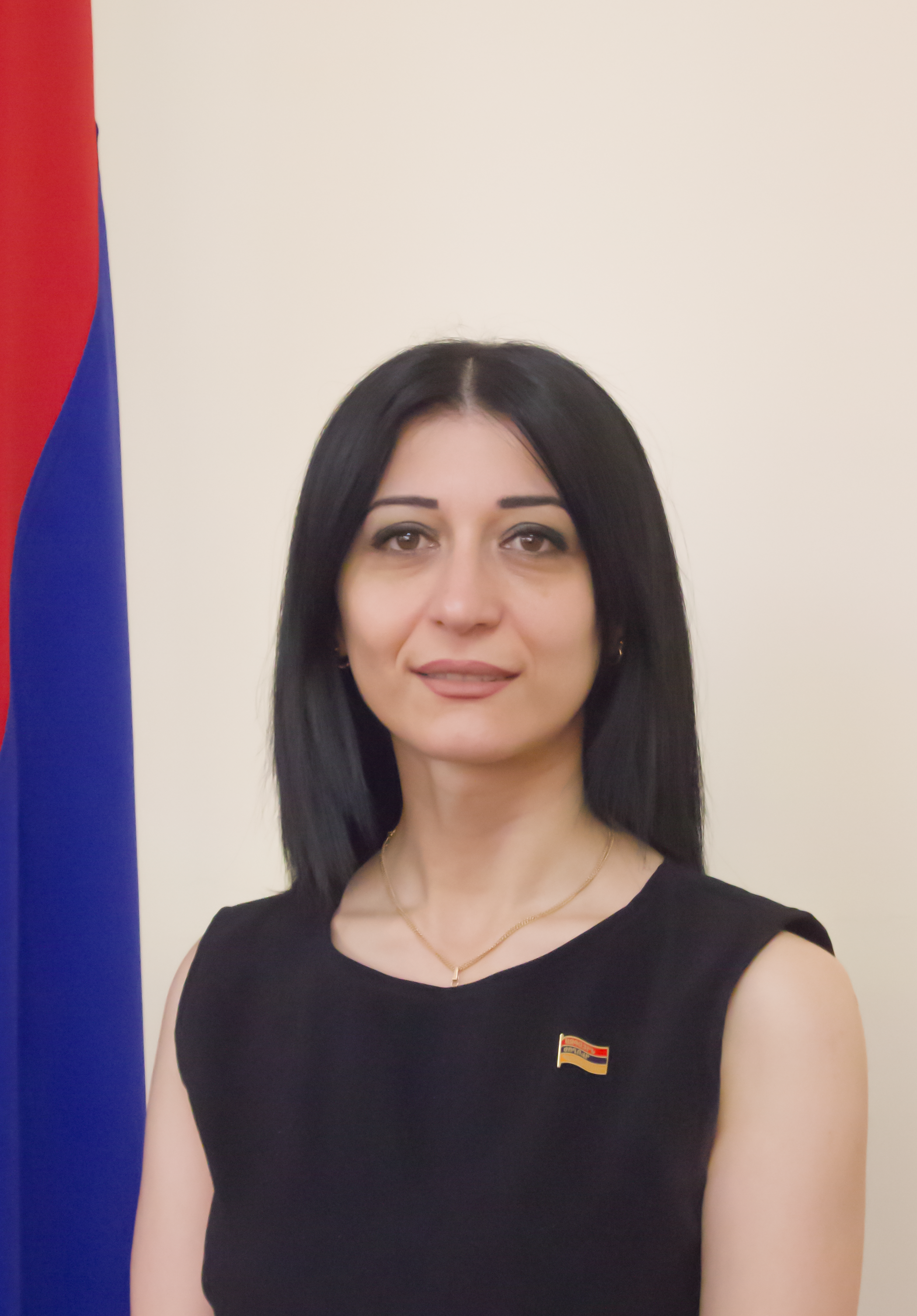

Member of Parliament of the National Assembly of Armenia
- Incumbent
- Assumed office December 2018

Personal details
- Born: Arpine Davoyan; 28 August 1985 (age 41) Stepanavan, Soviet Armenia
- Education: Vanadzor State University
- Occupation: Psychologist, Politician

Arpine Davoyan (Armenian: Արփինե Դավոյան; born 28 August 1985) is an Armenian psychologist and politician. She is a founding member of the Civil Contract party and a member of Parliament since 2018.

== Early life and education ==
Born in Stepanavan, Soviet Armenia, Davoyan studied psychology at the Vanadzor State University, from which she graduated in 2009. She is currently pursuing an master's degree in political sciences at the Armenian National Academy of Sciences.

== Professional life ==
After her graduation in 2009, she worked as a high school psychologist until 2014. Between 2015 and 2017 she worked as an accountant in the private sector.

== Political career ==
In 2015 she was a founding member of the Civil Contract party. She supported the Way Out Alliance as a clerk in the Armenian Parliament between 2017 and 2018. In June 2018 she became as an assistant to Nikol Pashinyan, the Prime Minister of Armenia of the Civil Contract. In the Parliamentary elections of December 2018, she was elected as a Member of Parliament for the Civil Contract of the My Step Alliance. In June 2019 she was elected as one of two women into the Board of the Civil Contract party. In Parliament, she defended the view that a country is in need of a healthy efficient opposition, but denied the current opposition were assuming such a role in January 2021.
