= HIMA Youth Initiative =

HIMA Youth Initiative Logo

HIMA! (Armenian: ՀԻՄԱ’, which in English means "NOW!"), was a youth initiative based in Yerevan, Armenia, advocating for democracy and civil rights during the last years of Armenia's former Presidents Robert Kocharyan's second term and first years of his successor, Serzh Sargsyan.

== Background ==
HIMA! was one of the slogans of the Popular Movement (Armenian: Համաժողովրդական շարժում) launched after the Presidential Elections of February 19, 2008 which according to the OSCE Office for Democratic Institutions and Human Rights (ODIHR):

"Mostly met OSCE commitments and international standards in the pre-election period and during voting hours, serious challenges to some commitments did emerge, especially after election day. This displayed an insufficient regard for standards essential to democratic elections and devalued the overall election process. In particular, the vote count demonstrated deficiencies of accountability and transparency, and complaints and appeals procedures were not fully effective."

Protests began when tens of thousands of supporters of the opposition presidential candidate Levon Ter-Petrossian took to the streets in downtown Yerevan on February 20 to denounce the declared election results and what they alleged to have been electoral fraud^{2}.

It was then that the catchword HIMA! was spontaneously born. When Ter-Petrossian asked the public to leave the square in order to come back the next day and continue their non-violent protest, the demonstrators started to chant en masse “HI-MA! HI-MA! HI-MA!”, purporting that they wanted to continue their protest "NOW!" and without further delay.

The protests continued peacefully at Freedom Square for the next 10 days, with many demonstrators camping out on the square in tents (2). Eventually, the slogan became widely popular due to the 24-hour-long protests at Freedom Square and other political marches during the period of February 21 thru March 1.

On March 1, Armenian security forces violently dispersed the crowd. According to official information, 31 persons (police and protesters) were injured. Later that day, protesters re-gathered and disturbances took place outside the French Embassy and the Yerevan City Hall. Later that day, police and security forces clashed with protesters, automatic weapons were fired, explosive devices were detonated, vehicles were set alight, and looting occurred. According to official sources 10 people died (8 protestors, 2 police officers), and some 130 injuries. President Kocharyan declared a state of emergency covering Yerevan, which among other restrictions, imposed a ban on rallies and gatherings and constrained media reporting to official information, de facto imposing censorship. According to official information, as of 19 March, 106 persons were detained and formally charged in connection with the events of 1 March.

== Objectives ==
HIMA! youth initiative was launched in April 2008. The initiative was composed of high school and college students at different levels, graduates and post-graduates, as well as young university professors and other youth of diverse backgrounds. HIMA!’s public agenda was made up of 3 key issues that according to them hindered Armenia’s democratic prospect. These issues were the following:

1. release of the persons detained on seemingly artificial and politically motivated charges (political prisoners)

2. freedom of meetings, assemblies, rallies and demonstrations in both law and practice

3. freedom and pluralism of public television and radio on a daily basis, as well as other broadcast media; ending harassment by the tax authorities of opposition electronic and printed media outlets.

1. Post-election processes were accompanied with arrest and continuing detention of scores of persons, including more than a 100 opposition supporters and three members of parliament, some of them on seemingly artificial and politically motivated charges. This constitutes a de facto crackdown on the opposition by the authorities. Most of the detainees are high-ranking members of opposition parties who ran Ter-Petrossian’s national and local election campaign offices. One of them, Ararat Zurabian, was the chairman of the Pan-Armenian National Movement (HHSh), the country’s former ruling party of which the ex-President remains a member. Most members of the HHSh’s governing board were also placed under arrest. Two prominent opposition leaders and Ter-Petrossian supporters- Nikol Pashinyan, the editor of “Haykakan Zhamanak”, Armenia's best-selling daily newspaper, and Khachatur Sukiasyan, member of the National Assembly and a top figure in Armenia's business circles, were wanted by the police. It was HIMA!’a goal to raise awareness of the issue of political prisoners and enhance the understanding of their civil rights among the general public.

2. A few days before the expiry of the state of emergency, on 17 March 2008, following a proposal by the government, the National Assembly, in an extraordinary session, adopted a series of amendments to the Law on Conducting Meetings, Assemblies, Rallies and Demonstrations which considerably limit the right of freedom of assembly and give great discretionary powers to the authorities to prohibit political rallies and demonstrations. Since these amendments “run counter to European standards, as enshrined, inter alia, in Article 11 of the European Convention on Human Rights” and Armenia's Constitution, HIMA! actively spreads alertness of the violation of basic human rights through non-violent actions that are mainly targeted at government officials and parliament members behind these amendments.

"Ticket to the Prison" Concert

3. There exists a general lack of diversity in the political viewpoints aired by the main broadcast media. Public opinion is not adequately informed through the exchange of political opinion and debate, for example, or through journalistic investigation, commentary and analysis. Along with this, “tax authorities have launched a rare financial inspection of Armenia’s leading newspapers critical of the government, sparking fears of renewed government restrictions on the local press”. Namely, opposition newspapers “Chorrord Ishkhanutyun”, “Zhamanak Yerevan”, “Haykakan Zhamanak” and “Aravot” were raided by the tax inspectors in March 2008. The Armenian Tax Service had already sparked controversy when it inspected the books of the Gyumri-based TV station GALA last October shortly after the latter broke ranks to provide airtime to Ter-Petrossian. GALA was subsequently fined almost 27 million drams ($87,000) for alleged tax evasion and other violations. A Gyumri court endorsed the fraud accusations on March 19. The cash-strapped broadcaster paid the hefty penalty only after a week-long fund-raising campaign. Even though there is a pluralistic and independent print media, the current level of control by the authorities of the electronic media and their regulatory bodies, as well as the absence of a truly independent and pluralist public broadcaster, impede the creation of a pluralistic media environment and further exacerbate the lack of public trust in the political system. HIMA! youth initiative, understanding the power of media, started an extensive campaign with a goal to raise the level of critique of broadcast media among the public and boost the number of newspaper readers, since newspapers are, on the whole, out of reach of authorities’ control and regulation.

== HIMA!'s tactics of non-violent struggle ==
March of "Political Prisoners"

HIMA!, predominantly composed of open-minded and tolerant youth, denies the use of violence in socio-political struggle, and is inclined to exercising a variety of non-violent tactics that either are the product of HIMA!'s creative minds, or were successfully applied by other struggle groups in other countries in the past. Among the tactics are use of symbols, symbolic sounds, performances of music, mock marches and parades, caricatures, boycott and ostracism of certain local "celebrities" and other public figures, boycott of certain consumer products, hunger strikes, group petitions, mock awards, disturbing of officials. Examples of non-violent actions by HIMA! include the live concert at the Northern Avenue, Downtown Yerevan, symbolically titled "Ticket to the Prison" ("Berdi Putevka"), performing serenades dedicated to freedom of assemblies and protests by the window of the Speaker of National Assembly, mock marches dressed in prisoners' uniforms and so on.

HIMA! cooperates with different social groups and organizations that are aimed at advocating human rights and shifting Armenia's democracy. Among these groups are "Women for Peace" NGO, "Hatuk Gund" Youth Movement, "Young Conservatives" NGO, Armenian Women's Movement and many others.

== See also ==
- Corruption in Armenia
- Media freedom in Armenia
- Social issues in Armenia
