= Zemfira Mirzoeva =

Armenian politician (born 1995)

- Զեմֆիրա Միրզոևա

Member of National Assembly
- Incumbent
- Assumed office 1 August 2021

Personal details
- Born: 20 May 1995 (age 31) Russia
- Education: Russian-Armenian University

Zemfira Mirzoeva (Armenian: Զեմֆիրա Միրզոևա; born 20 May 1995) is an Armenian politician. She has served as a member of the National Assembly since 2021.

== Early life and education ==
Mirzoeva was born on 20 May 1995 in Russia. In 2017, she graduated from the Russian-Armenian University through its Institute of Law and Politics, and three years later, she graduated from the Public Administration Academy of the Republic of Armenia via its Law Faculty.

== Political career ==
In the 2021 parliamentary election, Mirzoeva was elected to the National Assembly as part of the Armenia Alliance electoral list. She had been a member of the Reborn Armenia, but on 29 November 2022, she left the party. In the eighth convocation of the NA, she represents the Assyrian minority.
