= Taguhi Ghazaryan =

Armenian literary critic and politician

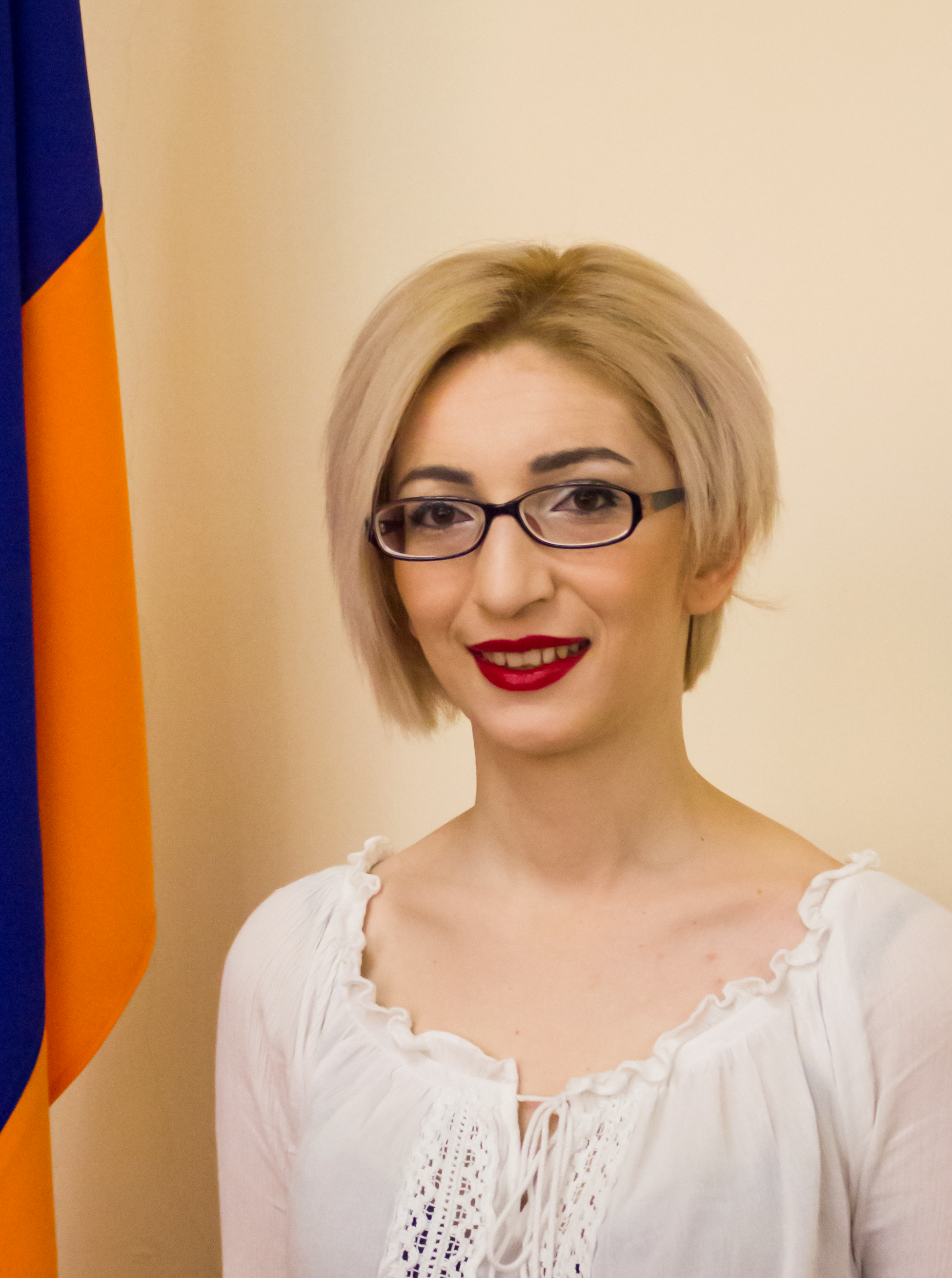

Member of the National Assembly
- Incumbent
- Assumed office 14 January 2019

Personal details
- Born: 16 March 1991 (age 35) Arshaluys, Armenia
- Party: Civil Contract
- Education: Yerevan State University

Taguhi Ararat Ghazaryan (Armenian: Թագուհի Արարատի Ղազարյան; 16 March 1991) is an Armenian literary critic and politician for the Civil Contract party, who has been a member of the National Assembly since the 2018 parliamentary elections.
