= Vasilios Poghosyan =

Greek footballer

Personal information
- Date of birth: 4 May 1998 (age 28)
- Place of birth: Athens, Greece
- Height: 1.79 m (5 ft 10 in)
- Position: Defensive midfielder

Team information
- Current team: Anagennisi Karditsas

Youth career
- Aetos Korydallou
- AEK Athens

Senior career*
Years	Team	Apps	(Gls)
2017–2018	Ionikos		
2018	Keratsini		
2018–2019	Ionikos	3	(0)
2020–2024	Ionikos	30	(0)
2024–	Anagennisi Karditsas	0	(0)
- * Club domestic league appearances and goals as of 29 April 2024

Vasilios Poghosyan (Greek: Βασίλειος Πογκοσιάν; born 4 May 1998) is a Greek-Armenian professional footballer who plays as a defensive midfielder for Gamma Ethniki club Anagennisi Karditsas.
