= Lusine Badalyan =

Armenian television presenter and politician

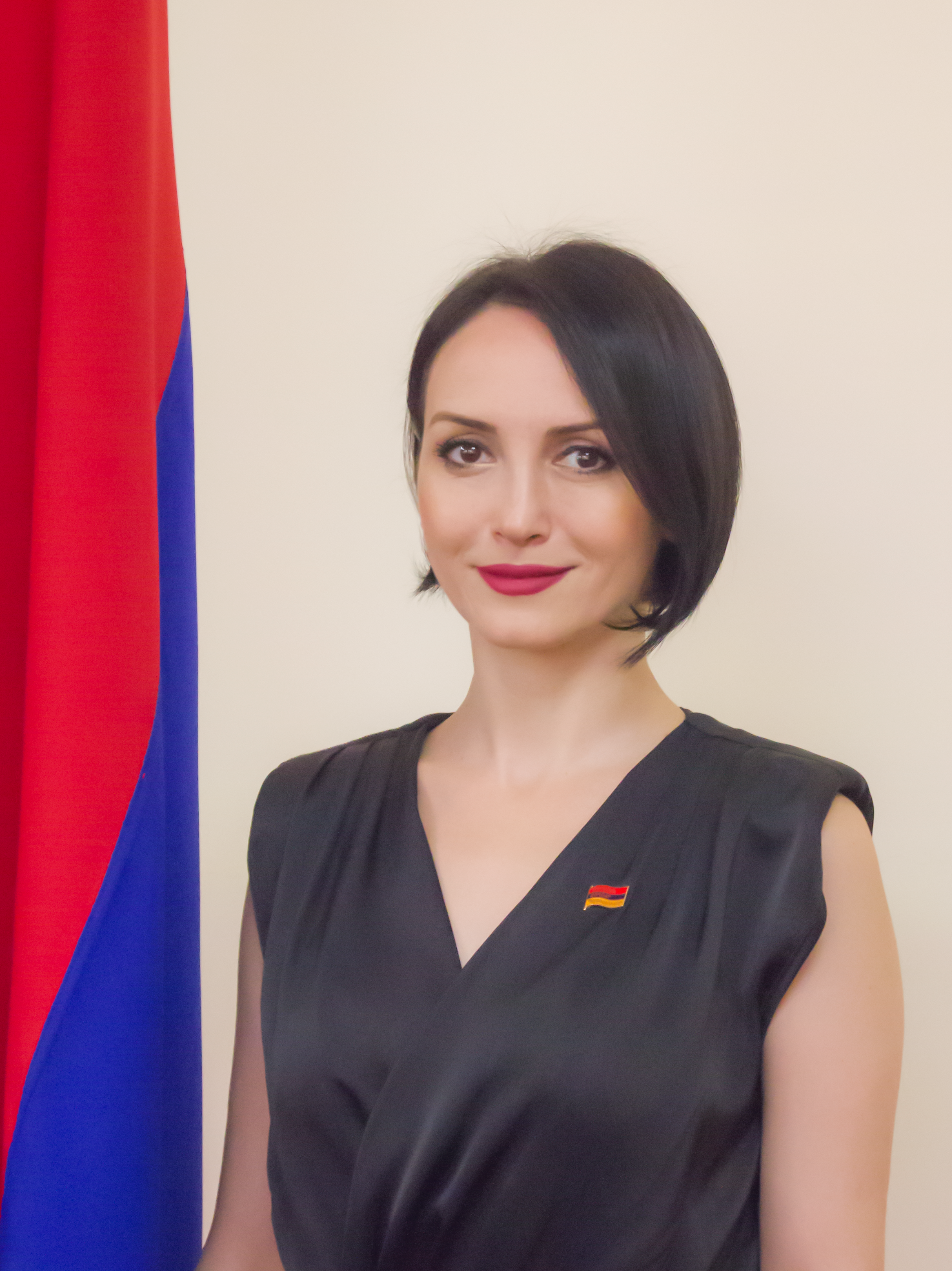
- Lusine Badalyan
- Born: 2 February 1980 (age 46); Yerevan, Armenian SSR, Soviet Union
- Occupations: Television presenter and politician

Lusine Khachiki Badalyan (Armenian: Լուսինե Խաչիկի Բադալյան; born 2 February 1980 in Yerevan) is an Armenian television presenter and politician, who has been a member of National Assembly of Armenia since 2018.

== 2022 incident ==
On 28 January 2022 a video appeared in Armenian media where Badalyan is laughing at the Yerablur Pantheon. She was criticized by relatives of the fallen servicemen, and a protest took place in front of the National Assembly building. A few days later, Badalyan apologized for "smiling broadly" in Yerablur.
