= Mariam Poghosyan =

Armenian politician (born 1995)

Member of National Assembly
- Incumbent
- Assumed office 1 August 2021

Personal details
- Born: 25 March 1995 (age 31) Yerevan, Armenia
- Party: Civil Contract
- Education: Yerevan State University

Mariam Ashoti Poghosyan (Armenian: Մարիամ Աշոտի Պողոսյան; born 25 March 1995) is an Armenian politician. She has served as a member of the National Assembly since 2021.

== Early life and education ==
Poghosyan was born on 25 March 1995 in Yerevan. In 2017, she graduated from the Yerevan State University through its Faculty of International Relations, in the department of Political Science.

== Political career ==
In the 2021 parliamentary election, Poghosyan was elected to the National Assembly as a member of Civil Contract, as part of their electoral list. In the eighth convocation of the NA, she is a member of the Friendship Groups.
