= Gegham Nazaryan =

Armenian politician

- Գեղամ Նազարյան
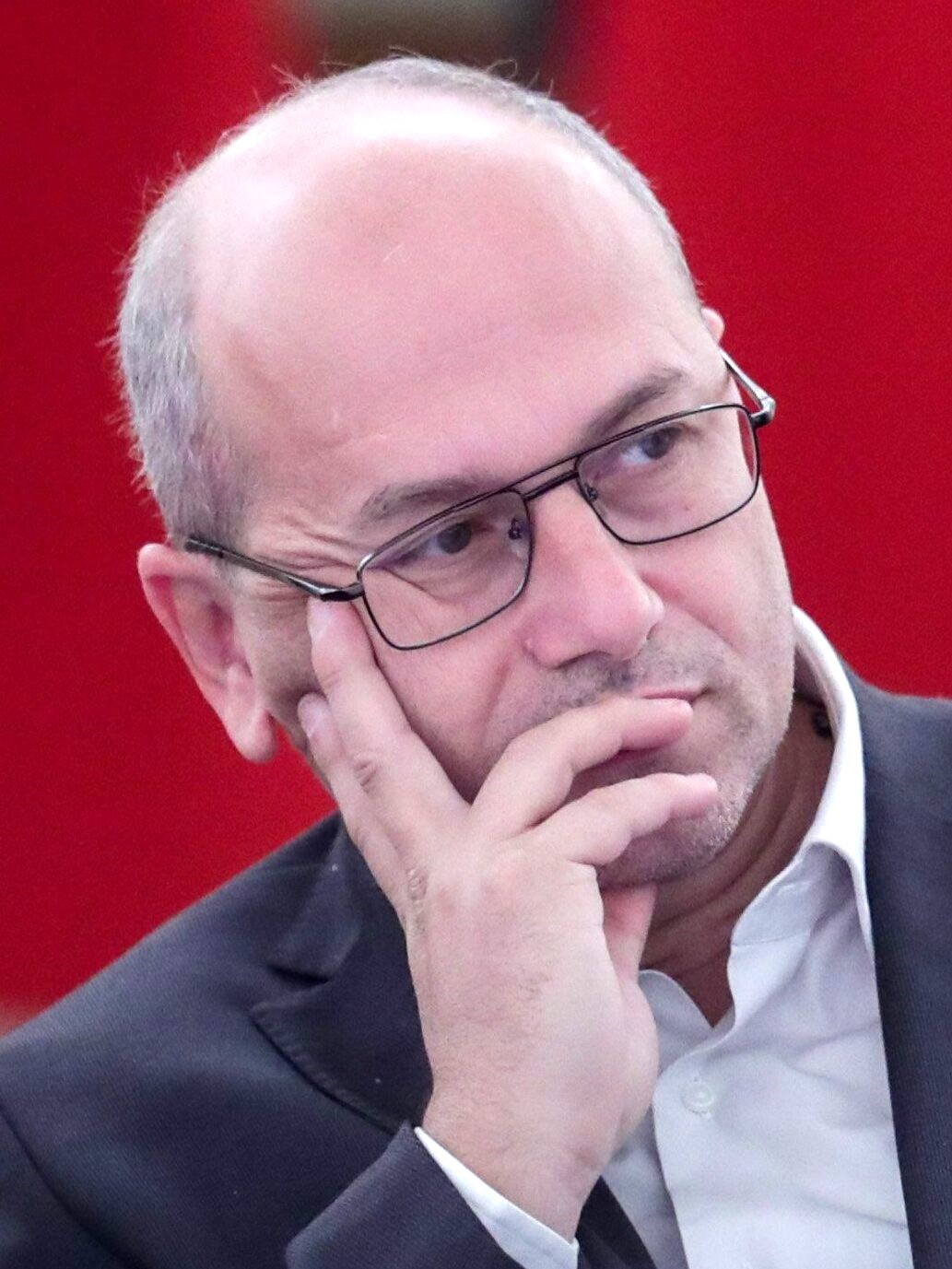
- Nazaryan in 2023

Member of the National Assembly
- Incumbent
- Assumed office 20 June 2021

Personal details
- Born: 6 July 1971 (age 55) Yerevan, Armenian SSR, Soviet Union
- Citizenship: Armenian
- Party: Independent (since 2024)
- Other political affiliations: Armenia Alliance (2021–2024)
- Children: 3
- Education: Armenian State Pedagogical University

Military service
- Branch/service: Armed Forces of Armenia
- Years of service: 1994–1995

Gegham Nazaryan (alternatively Nazarian; Armenian: Գեղամ Արմենակի Նազարյան, born 6 July 1971) is an Armenian politician and former journalist, who's currently serving as a Member of the National Assembly since June 2021.

Having studied geography in the Armenian State Pedagogical University, Nazaryan started his career as a journalist and editor to the Hayk newspaper. He later worked for Haykakan Zhamanak, and was elected to the National Assembly of the country in 2021. He was elected to the Parliament through the Armenia Alliance party list, but later left the faction.

== Early life and education ==
Gegham Nazaryan was born on July 6, 1971 in Yerevan.

In 1994, Nazaryan graduated from the geographical department of the historical and geographical faculty of Armenian State Pedagogical University. From 1994 to 1995, he served in the Armed Forces of Armenia.

== Career ==
From 1995 to 1999 and later from 2006 to 2010, Nazaryan was a journalist, executive secretary, editor, and editor-in-chief of the Hayk newspaper. Between the years 1999 and 2006, he was head of the international department of the Haykakan Zhamanak newspaper.

Later, for a decade, between 2011 and 2021, Nazaryan was editor-in-chief of Top-news.am. From 2017 to 2021, he was additionally the founder of the Neopress LLC.

=== Member of Parliament (since 2021) ===
On June 20, 2021, Nazaryan was elected to the National Assembly of Armenia through the Armenia Alliance party list.

On November 30, 2024, Nazaryan left the Armenia Alliance political faction. The official reasoning was that Nazaryan's political views have shifted away from the party. He has been serving as an independent since then.

== Personal life ==
Gegham Nazaryan is married and had three children. Nazaryan's son was killed in the Nagorno-Karabakh conflict.

In 2022, Nazaryan's son Armenak was reported to have been assaulted by policemen as he was trying to help fellow Member of Parliament Gegham Manukyan's son Taron Manukyan.
