= Hakob Arshakyan =

Armenian politician

Hakob Arshakyan (born 16 April 1985) is an Armenian politician from Civil Contract. He has been Vice President of the Armenian National Assembly since 2021.

== Biography ==
Hakob Arshakyan was born in 1985 in Yerevan. From 2005 to 2009, he studied and graduated from the "Electronic Computing Devices Construction (Construction) and Technology" department of the State Engineering University of Armenia, receiving a specialization in microelectronic circuits and systems. From 2009 to 2011, he received a master's degree in the same university's electronic engineering department and a "Design of large-scale integrated circuits" " specialization.

From 2008-2012, he was a co-founding member of the "HIMA" initiative, and since 2012, he has been the president of the "HIMA" public organization. From 2010 to 2014, he was a systems engineer at National Instruments, in 2014–2017, regional manager of the Alliance partner program (the region includes India, Russia, and the CIS, Arab countries, and Africa), in 2017–2018, at Araxis Founder, executive director of Engineering" company.

On May 16, 2018, he was appointed Armenia's first deputy minister of transport, communication, and information technologies. On October 4, 2018, he was appointed Armenia's minister of transportation, communication, and information technologies, and on June 1, 2019 - Minister of the high-tech industry.

At the 38th session coordinating the transport of the CIS participating states, Hakob Arshakyan was elected the deputy chairman of the consultation coordinating the transportation of the CIS participating states for five years.

=== Party Activity ===
Since 2015, he has been a member of the founding board of the "Civil Contract" party.

At the 5th congress of the "Civil Contract" party held on June 16, 2019, he was elected a CP board member.

On June 20, 2021, he was elected a deputy of the 8th convocation of National Assembly on the list of the "Civil Contract" party.

On August 4, 2021, he was elected Armenia's Deputy Speaker at the NA session.
