= Lilit Galstyan =

Armenian politician

Member of the National Assembly of Armenia
- Incumbent
- Assumed office 2007

Personal details
- Born: 28 November 1962 (age 63) Yerevan
- Occupation: Politician; Linguist

Lilit Galstyan is an Armenian politician, linguist, and social scientist. She was elected to the Armenian National Assembly on the party list of the Armenian Revolutionary Federation.

== Life and career ==
Galstyan was born in Yerevan on 28 November 1962. She attended Yerevan State University, where she graduated from with a degree in philology in 1985. She worked for a year as a teacher in Talin, and then for several years at the Organization of the Black Sea Economic Cooperation. She then worked as a coordinator for the Hamazkayin, before joining the Armenian Ministry of Science and Education. In 1996, she obtained a master's degree in political science from the American University of Armenia, and then she continued to study politics at the Tbilisi School of Political Studies. In 2006, she earned her PhD in linguistics from the Armenian National Academy of Sciences. She was then a lecturer for 2 years at Glendale Community College.

She has written books, including several translations of books from English. She won a prize from the Canadian Embassy in Armenia for the best translation of English literature into the Armenian language.

Galstyan was elected to the National Assembly of Armenia in May 2007. In the legislature, Glastyan has been a member of the Standing Committee on Science, Education, Culture, Youth, and Sports.
