= Khachatur Sukiasyan =

Armenian politician

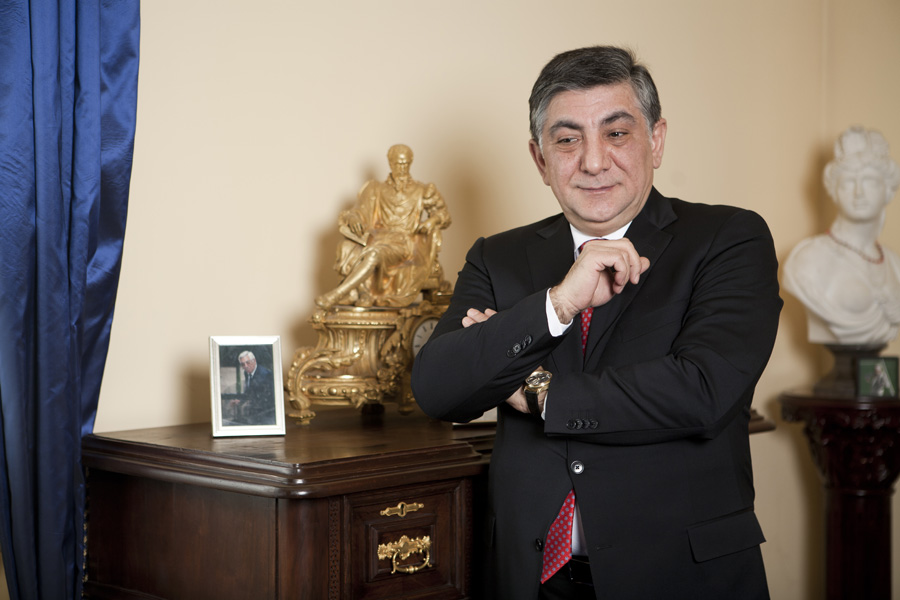

Personal details
- Born: September 15, 1961 (age 64) Yerevan, Armenia

Khachatur Sukiasyan (Armenian: Խաչատուր Սուքիասյան), is an Armenian politician and a businessman. He was elected to the National Assembly of Armenia three times as an independent and most recently in 2021 as a candidate for the Civil Contract Party. He is one of the co-founders of the Union of Manufacturers and Businessmen, member of the Board of Trustees of the Yerevan Engineering University. Khachatur Sukiasyan is the Founder of SIL Group.

== Biography ==
Khachatur Sukiasyan was born in 1961 in Yerevan. He graduated from the Yerevan Engineering University in 1985, the Faculty of Informatics, with a qualification of hardware engineer. During his student years he ran a students’ construction squad and was simultaneously employed as a part-time locksmith in Sirius Factory, the leading military-industrial factory of Armenia. After graduating, he worked as a field head in Sirius Factory, and eventually as a director of the production. Later he was appointed the director of Van factory. From 1992 to 1994 he was the head of the Economic Relations General Department in Armenia's Ministry of Industry, and also served as an adviser to the Minister of Industry. In 1994 he fully dedicated himself to his family business activities, which began in 1987, once cooperative activity was allowed in the Soviet Union. In 1996, all manufacturing, construction and service companies belonging to the Sukiasyan family were united under the SIL Group, which was led by Sukiasyan until 2005. SIL Group employed about 8,000 people.

Sukiasyan's family holds controlling interest in ARMECONOMBANK OJSC, one of the leading banks of Armenia. Khachatur Sukiasyan is also the founder of inLOBBY GmbH, the company which runs the inLOBBY online hotel booking platform.

== Political Activity ==
In 1999, 2003, and 2007 he was elected to the National Assembly of Armenia from different electoral districts in the center of Yerevan.

Sukiasyan was a member of the National Assembly Standing Committee on Financial-Credit/Fiscal, Budgetary and Economic Affairs, and also participated in works of NA (National Assembly) Standing Committee on European Integration. In course of his parliamentary activity Sukiasyan participated in the discussion and development of many economic laws and proposed around 600 bills. He proposed a number of new laws aimed at the development of entrepreneurship, free economic competitive relationships, and simplification of the tax system in the country.

In 2005 he resigned from the post of SIL Group president, according to the amendments of Armenia's new constitution, which forbade entrepreneurship on behalf of members of parliament. In 2008 Sukiasyan supported the candidacy of the first president of Armenia, Levon Ter-Petrosyan, in upcoming presidential elections. After Ter-Petrosyan accused the ruling government of falsifying the elections, mass protests broke out in Armenia, which were suppressed by the police and military following the declaration of a state of emergency. Sukiasyan was deprived of his parliamentary immunity. A criminal case was launched against him, which was later closed. In 2009, Sukiasyan resigned from the Armenian parliament. In 2012 he again ran for parliament, however the authorities did not register his candidacy.

He was elected to parliament in the 2021 Armenian parliamentary election as a candidate on the electoral list of the ruling Civil Contract Party.
