= Armen Poghosyan (conductor) =

Armen Anushavanovich Poghosyan (Russian: Погос́ян Арм́ен Анушав́анович) (born 1 February 1974, Moscow, Russia) — a Russian-Armenian conductor, musical leader and conductor of "School of Dramatic Art" theatre, art leader and conductor of "Sofia" Russian private orchestra.

== Biography ==
Armen Poghosyan was born in 1974 in Moscow city. He studied choral and symphonic conduction at Moscow Conservatory (1997–2002).

He became choirmaster of Academic Chorus guided by S. Strokin (1995). He became a musical leader and conductor of "School of Dramatic Art" theatre (2006).

== Musical leader and conductor ==
Poghosyan directed performances Demon (Golden Mask Award), Bidding, Cow, Opus №7 (Golden Mask and Crystal Turandot Awards), Tararabumbia as a musical leader and conductor.

From 2000 to 2008 became a music leader at the Pythagoras studios for the duplication of Russian language full-length musical films and cartoons such as Mary Poppins, Sleeping Beauty, Corpse Bride, Hannah Montana, The Hunchback of Notre Dame, The Little Mermaid, Shrek.

== Musician ==
In 2008 he organized youth group "Oliver Twist" — men's quartet under support of a show-group "Doctor Watson".

He worked on the vocal parts in the Russian adaptations of the animated films "Shrek the Third" and "Megamind".

== Awards ==
In 2007 he received a thanksgiving letter from "Disney" company for scoring for sound a platinum collection of "The Jungle Book" full-length cartoon.

He has twice received the Golden Mask theatrical award.

== Sofia Symphony Orchestra ==
In 2010 Pogosian became a conductor of the private "Sofia" Symphony Orchestra.
