= Taguhi Tovmasyan =

Armenian politician

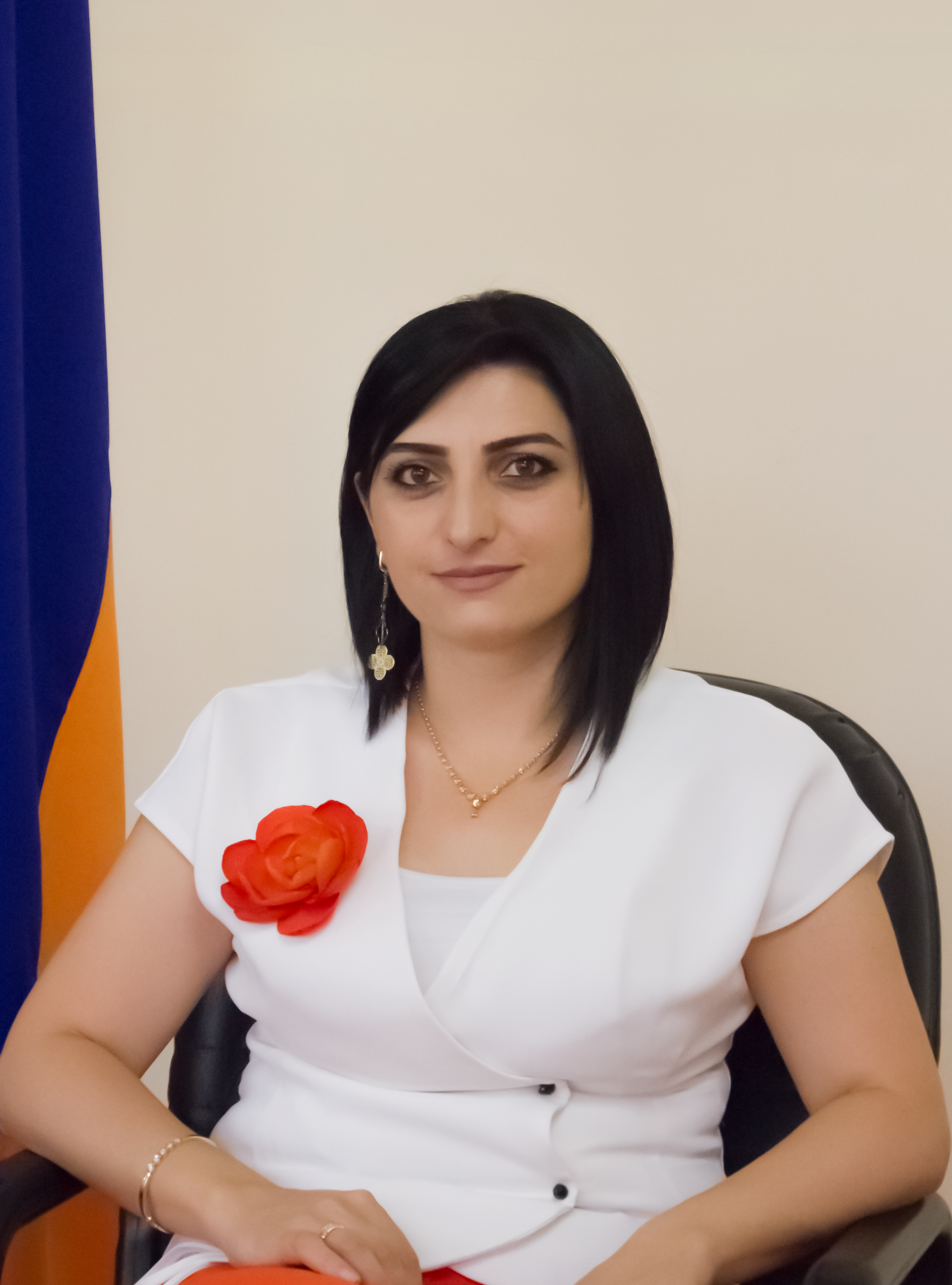

Member of the National Assembly
- Incumbent
- Assumed office 14 January 2019

Personal details
- Born: 14 August 1982 (age 44) Vardenis, Armenian SSR, Soviet Union
- Party: Independent
- Education: Armenian State Pedagogical University

Taguhi Tovmasyan (Armenian: Թագուհի Թովմասյան; born 14 August 1982, Vardenis, Armenian SSR, USSR) is an Armenian politician and the Deputy of the 7th convocation of the National Assembly of Armenia, Guide-translator (English), journalist, and politician.

== Biography ==
Tovmasyan was born August 1982 in Vardenis.

She studied at the Faculty of Humanities at the Armenian State Pedagogical University from where she graduated as an English guide translator in 2000 and a journalist in 2003. In 2013, she graduated with a MSc in political science from the Armenian Academy of Public Administration. She followed up on her studies in journalism in international standards of journalism at the Institute for War en Peace Reporting in Yerevan in 2004, and in a program on juridical journalism from the Association of European Journalists. In 2014-2015 she participated in Democracy courses organized in Yerevan by the Council of Europe.

== Professional career ==
Between 2003 and 2004 she was a volunteer at the “Iravunk newspaper” in which in 2004 she was promoted to the political department of the newspaper.

2004 - 2007 - Journalist of the political department of the “Iravunk” newspaper. 2007- 2011 - Journalist of the newspaper “The Fourth Power” of the LLC agency “Ogostos” (“August”).

In 2011- she was the founding head of the “Zhoghovurd Publishing House LLC” (“Zhoghovurd” daily newspaper, ArmLur.am news site). She was also the Editor-in-Chief of “Zhoghovurd” newspaper and ArmLur.am website.The publishing house was raided in December 2019.

== Political career ==
2019 - 2021- Member of the National Assembly (territorial electoral list of the electoral district #8 of the “My Step” alliance of parties). On November 16, 2020, in protest of the defeat in the Second Nagorno Karabakh war, she left the faction of the National Assembly "My Step". Following she joined the I have Honor alliance (Pativ Unem) who nominated her to the parliamentarian Human Rights commission.

On 31 March 2021 at the 11th annual AAD Award Ceremony, she received nomination “Best Parliament Member of the Year” for the Deputy activity in 2020.

June 20, 2021 - Elected Member of the National Assembly from the national electoral list of the “With Honor” alliance of parties.

== Family ==
She is married and has two children.

== See also ==
- List of members of the seventh National Assembly of Armenia
