= My Step Alliance =

Armenian political alliance

My Step Alliance «Իմ Քայլը» դաշինք
- Leader: Nikol Pashinyan
- Founded: 1 August 2018
- Dissolved: May 2021
- Headquarters: Yerevan
- Ideology: Liberal democracy Neoliberalism; Reformism
- Political position: Centre
- Alliance of: Civil Contract; Mission Party
- Colours: Red; Blue
- Slogan: "Happy individual, caring society, strong state"

Website
- Official website

The My Step Alliance (Armenian: Իմ Քայլը դաշինք, romanized: Im k’aylə dashink', IKD) was a political alliance in Armenia formed by the Civil Contract party, the Mission Party and various independent representatives of civil society. It was formed in August 2018, before the 2018 Yerevan City Council election. The leader of the alliance was the Prime Minister of Armenia Nikol Pashinyan. Despite its dissolution as a national party in May 2021, the My Step Alliance operated in the Yerevan City Council until the end of its mandate in September 2023.

== History ==
First logo of the alliance used for the Yerevan City Council election

On 31 March, at the beginning of the 2018 Armenian revolution, Nikol Pashinyan and a group of supporters began a march from Gyumri, Armenia's second largest city. The campaign, named "My Step", was declared with the intention to prevent Serzh Sargsyan's election as prime minister on 17 April.

On 23 September 2018, the alliance participated in the 2018 Yerevan City Council election with Hayk Marutyan as a candidate for Mayor and won 57 seats out of 65 in the Yerevan City Council.

The alliance ran in the 2018 Armenian parliamentary election. They won 88 of 132 seats, gaining a ruling majority in the National Assembly.

The alliance dissolved in May 2021, following an announcement that Civil Contract would participate in the 2021 Armenian parliamentary elections independently.

The alliance, however, continued governing in the Yerevan City Council until the end of its mandate. Following the 2023 Yerevan City Council elections, the alliance had completely dissolved.

== Ideology ==
The coalition was perceived as maintaining a big tent ideology rather than supporting any one particular political position.

The coalition's main focus was on anti-corruption efforts while developing Armenia's civil society and democracy and promoting the economic development of the country. However, Nikol Pashinyan has been described as a centrist politician with a liberal outlook. In terms of foreign policy, before coming to power, Pashinyan was a skeptic of Russia. However, following his victory, Pashinyan changed his official opinion and opted to maintain strong relations between Armenia and Russia. Despite this, Pashinyan also supported the development of bilateral relations with the European Union and the United States.

== Composition ==
The alliance was composed of the following parties, as well as some independents.

Party	Ideology	Position	Leader
Civil Contract	Liberalism, Reformism, Populism	Centre	Nikol Pashinyan
Mission Party	Liberalism	Centre	Manuk Sukiasyan

== Electoral record ==
=== Parliamentary elections ===
Election	Votes	%	Seats	+/–	Position	Government
2018	884,456	70.43	88 / 132	New	1st	Government

=== Local elections ===
==== Yerevan City Council elections ====
Election	Mayor candidate	Votes	%	Seats in City Council
2018	Hayk Marutyan	294,109	81.06%	57 / 65

== See also ==
- Politics of Armenia
- Programs of political parties in Armenia
