= Civil Contract (Armenia) =

Armenian political party

Civil Contract Քաղաքացիական Պայմանագիր
- Abbreviation: KP
- Leader: Nikol Pashinyan
- Secretary: Suren Papikyan
- Spokesperson: Vahan Kostanyan
- Founded: December 9, 2013 (as NGO); May 30, 2015 (as political party)
- Headquarters: Yerevan
- Membership (2022): 5,390
- Ideology: Liberalism; Reformism; Populism; Pro-Europeanism
- Political position: Centre
- National affiliation: Way Out Alliance (2016–2018); My Step Alliance (2018–2021)
- Colours: Dark blue and white Light blue (customary)
- Slogan: Stand up for peace
- National Assembly: 64 / 105
- Yerevan City Council: 24 / 65

Party flag

Website
- https://www.civilcontract.am/

Civil Contract (Armenian: Քաղաքացիական պայմանագիր (ՔՊ), romanized: K’aghak’atsiakan paymanagir, KP; often shortened to Քաղպայմանագիր, K’aghpaymanagir) is a centrist political party in Armenia. It has been the ruling party of Armenia since the 2018 Armenian parliamentary election, which occurred following the 2018 Armenian Revolution that brought the party's founder, Nikol Pashinyan, to power as prime minister. Prior to the 2026 election, the party holds a majority (61 seats) in the National Assembly and governs together with eight independents as part of the Civil Contract faction.

== History ==
=== Formation as an NGO ===
On January 23, 2013, opposition MP Nikol Pashinyan publicized a project to establish a new political process, which he called a "civil contract," in the newspaper Haykakan Zhamanak (The Armenian Times). For several months afterwards, the text of the contract was widely discussed in Armenian political forums. An updated version of the contract was published and Civil Contract was officially established as a non-governmental organization on July 24, 2013. Its governing board was formed on December 9, 2013.

=== Transformation into a political party ===
On May 30, 2015, Civil Contract was registered as a political party. Civil Contract participated in the 2017 Armenian parliamentary election and the 2017 Yerevan City Council election as part of the Way Out Alliance (Yelk). Following the 2018 Armenian Velvet Revolution led by Nikol Pashinyan, a new political alliance rose to prominence known as the My Step Alliance. After the 2018 Armenian parliamentary election, the My Step Alliance gained a ruling majority in the National Assembly. The My Step Alliance dissolved in May 2021 as Civil Contract opted to participate in the 2021 Armenian parliamentary elections independently. Following the election, Civil Contract was able to retain their ruling majority.

=== Velvet Revolution ===
On March 31, 2018, Civil Contract leader Nikol Pashinyan and his supporters began a 200-kilometre (120 mi) march from Gyumri (Armenia's second-largest city) to the capital, Yerevan, to dissuade Prime Minister Serzh Sargsyan from retaining power beyond his legal term limit. On April 17, Nikol Pashinyan announced the start of a national, nonviolent "velvet revolution" to thousands of supporters gathered near the National Assembly. On April 22, several hours after a brief meeting with Sargsyan, Pashinyan was arrested with about 250 other protesters. After mass strikes by organized labor and streets blockaded by over 300,000 protesters (including soldiers and Civil Contract members), Sargsyan resigned on April 23. He said then, "Nikol Pashinyan was right. I was wrong. The movement of the street is against my office. I'm fulfilling your demands." According to contemporaneous reporting by Al Jazeera's Robin Forestier-Walker, "Thousands of people are on the streets, cheering and hugging each other, jumping up and down and honking their horns... things happened so quickly, I don't think the crowd was expecting this, but it is exactly what they wanted."

The revolution was seen as an opportunity for Armenia to realign its foreign policy in the European direction. The revolution contradicted Russian policy, as it opposed the notion of the irreplaceability of post-Soviet leaders and posed a threat to authoritarianism in the post-Soviet space. The revolution in Armenia was deemed "European" in nature as it corresponded to European values and principles, both societal and political.

=== 2020–2021 protests and political crisis ===
On March 18, 2021, Prime Minister Nikol Pashinyan announced early parliamentary elections, to take place on June 20, 2021. The announcement was made during a period of political unrest in the country, following the defeat of Armenia in the 2020 Nagorno-Karabakh war. Nikol Pashinyan subsequently resigned as Prime Minister, but continued his duties as acting Prime Minister.

Civil Contract confirmed its intention to participate in the 2021 Armenian parliamentary elections, with Nikol Pashinyan leading the party as its candidate for prime minister. The party also confirmed that they would be running in the election independently, effectively dissolving the My Step Alliance. While the party did run independently, Gurgen Arsenyan, leader of the United Labour Party confirmed that he would participate with Civil Contract. In addition, the vice-chairman of Mighty Homeland, Shirak Torosyan, also announced he would participate with Civil Contract. Following the election, Civil Contract won 53.9% of the popular vote, gaining a supermajority of 71 seats in the National Assembly. Party leader Nikol Pashinyan was officially appointed Armenia's prime minister.

=== 2022–present activities ===
On August 31, 2022, Nikol Pashinyan met with the President of the Council of the European Union, Charles Michel, in Brussels to discuss a peaceful resolution to the Armenia–Azerbaijan border crisis.

On February 17, 2023, Nikol Pashinyan met with European Commission President Ursula von der Leyen in Munich. The sides discussed various issues related to Armenia-European Union cooperation. The parties exchanged ideas on projects to be implemented in Armenia within the framework of the economic and investment plan of the Eastern Partnership.

In February 2023, Pashinyan announced support of the European Union Mission in Armenia. According to Pashinyan, the mission became possible following negotiations held between Armenia, Azerbaijan, and the EU on the sidelines of the first European Political Community summit in Prague. On May 4, 2023, Nikol Pashinyan stated, "Armenia is interested in deepening cooperation with the European Union" and that the EU mission would help "maintain international attention towards our region."

== Ideology ==
The Civil Contract Party has no definite official ideology. Its leader, Nikol Pashinyan, states: "There are no clear lines between political ideologies anymore ... in the 21st century, those lines disappeared. It's not acceptable for me to call our party 'liberal,' 'centrist,' or 'social democrat,' because the goals we have to achieve are beyond '-isms.'" Despite this, Pashinyan himself has been described as a radical centrist, a reformist, or a liberal (and occasionally a populist) in favor of a liberal democracy by international media.

=== Objectives ===
The party announced their goal to double the population of Armenia within the next 20 years, ensure human rights and freedoms of all citizens, eliminate all forms of corruption, and to further strengthen and develop the economy, while protecting the environment.

=== Foreign policy ===
Prior to the 2018 election, Civil Contract was in favor of developing closer ties with the European Union and supported Armenia's inclusion in a Deep and Comprehensive Free Trade Area with the EU. Party leader Nikol Pashinyan was skeptical of Armenia's membership in the Eurasian Economic Union and complained that membership had brought no benefits to Armenia. However, following his electoral victory, Pashinyan changed his official position and announced his support of Armenia's membership in the Eurasian Economic Union. Civil Contract claims that Armenia should not make a choice between the East and the West. Instead, Armenia should become an example and mediator of dialogue and cooperation.

Civil Contract advocates for maintaining strong connections between Armenia and Russia while promoting Eurasian integration with other Commonwealth of Independent States and Eurasian Economic Union member states. At the same time, Civil Contract continues to support Armenia's European integration through developing closer ties with the European Union and to eliminate visa requirements for Armenian citizens traveling to the EU's Schengen Area. In October 2019, Deputy Prime Minister Tigran Avinyan stated that he sees a lot of potential growth in both economic and political ties with the EU. Avinyan also advised that, "Any future EU accession is a question that the people of Armenia need to answer and would only occur following the withdrawal of Armenia from the Eurasian Union."

In 2019, the party's leader categorically ruled out the prospect of Armenia leaving the EAEU or the CSTO, stating that Armenia would not do a "u-turn" in foreign policy. A new party program was adopted, which stated the party's intention for Armenia to "not choose between East and West" and that the country's foreign relations ought to be based on protecting the nation's sovereignty.

The party supports the implementation of the Armenia–EU Comprehensive and Enhanced Partnership Agreement (CEPA), which entered into force on March 1, 2021. Nikol Pashinyan stated, "CEPA is a strategic program for development of our country, and it can become one of the cornerstones of our reforms agenda" and "I believe it is in Europe's interests to have a stable, democratic partner in the unstable region of the South Caucasus, a partner in the shape of developing and progressive Armenia that shares common European values with the union."

The party's 2018 electoral program stated that it believes in deepening relations with China, Japan, India, Iran, Georgia, Latin America, and the Middle East, as well as securing international recognition of the Republic of Artsakh and the Armenian genocide. In its 2021 electoral program, the party declared that the resolution of the Nagorno-Karabakh conflict through the "realization of the Artsakh Armenians' right to self-determination" and the implementation of the principle of remedial secession would be among its priorities. In a speech made in April 2022, however, Nikol Pashinyan stated that Armenia would have to "slightly lower" the bar for what it could expect to achieve in negotiation with Azerbaijan, and that the Armenian government would focus on securing "security guarantees and rights" for the Armenians of Nagorno-Karabakh, rather than on securing the region's political status. In May 2023, Pashinyan stated that Armenia had recognized the territorial integrity of Azerbaijan, including Nagorno-Karabakh. He added that the issue of the "rights and safety" of the Karabakh Armenian population should be discussed between the Azerbaijani authorities and the Armenian leadership of Nagorno-Karabakh. Nagorno-Karabakh was forcibly retaken by Azerbaijan in September 2023, leading to the exodus of its Armenian population. In February 2024, Pashinyan stated that he was in favor of a constitutional amendment to remove a portion of the Armenian constitution which calls for the unification of Nagorno-Karabakh with Armenia.

On September 3, 2023, during an interview, Prime Minister Nikol Pashinyan stated that it was a strategic mistake for Armenia to solely rely on Russia to guarantee its security. Pashinyan stated, "Moscow has been unable to deliver and is in the process of winding down its role in the wider South Caucasus region" and "the Russian Federation cannot meet Armenia's security needs. This example should demonstrate to us that dependence on just one partner in security matters is a strategic mistake." Pashinyan accused Russian peacekeepers deployed to uphold the ceasefire deal of failing to do their job. Pashinyan confirmed that Armenia is trying to diversify its security arrangements, most notably with the European Union and the United States.

On October 17, 2023, prime minister Nikol Pashinyan addressed the European Parliament. Pashinyan stated, "on October 5 of this year, two extremely important documents for EU–Armenia relations were adopted in Granada. Both statements support the strengthening of EU–Armenia relations in all dimensions based on the needs of the Republic of Armenia" and "we are committed to further strengthen EU–Armenia relations. In the long term, the European Union and Armenia are determined to strengthen their economic ties by working to unlock the full potential of the Comprehensive and Enhanced Partnership Agreement. The Republic of Armenia is ready to be closer to the European Union, as much as the European Union considers it possible."

On November 14, 2023, Civil Contract deputy and Chairman of the Standing Committee on European Integration Arman Yeghoyan stated that "Armenia may plan to join the European Union in the future" during a press conference. On November 15, 2023, Minister of Foreign Affairs Ararat Mirzoyan stated "I want to commend the European Commission's decision to recommend the European Council to open accession talks with Moldova and Ukraine and to grant candidate status to Georgia. This decision is welcomed not only by the Government of Armenia, but also people of Armenia, who also have European aspirations."

On February 23, 2024, Nikol Pashinyan confirmed that Armenia has frozen its participation in the CSTO. Pashinyan stated, "We have now in practical terms frozen our participation in this treaty" and "membership of the CSTO was under review" during a live broadcast interview. On February 28, 2024, during a question and answer session in the National Assembly, Pashinyan further stated that the CSTO is "a threat to the national security of Armenia."

On February 29, 2024, the President of the National Assembly Alen Simonyan stated that Armenia should seek EU membership. Simonyan stated, "Our actions show that we have much better democracy indicators than many of our partners that are already members of the EU. I think that we should think about seeking EU candidate status." On March 2, 2024, Nikol Pashinyan advised that Armenia would officially "apply to become a candidate for EU membership in the coming days, within a month at most."

On September 9, 2024, prime minister Nikol Pashinyan confirmed that the issue of starting the EU membership process has become part of the Armenian political agenda. Pashinyan stated, "discussions are underway in the country regarding the possibility of Armenia becoming a member of the European Union," during a meeting with Vice-President of the European Commission Margaritis Schinas.

On February 12, 2025, Armenia's parliament approved a bill officially endorsing Armenia's EU accession. The decision for the government to pass the bill was reported to be the first step of "the beginning of the accession process of Armenia to the European Union".

== Governing board ==
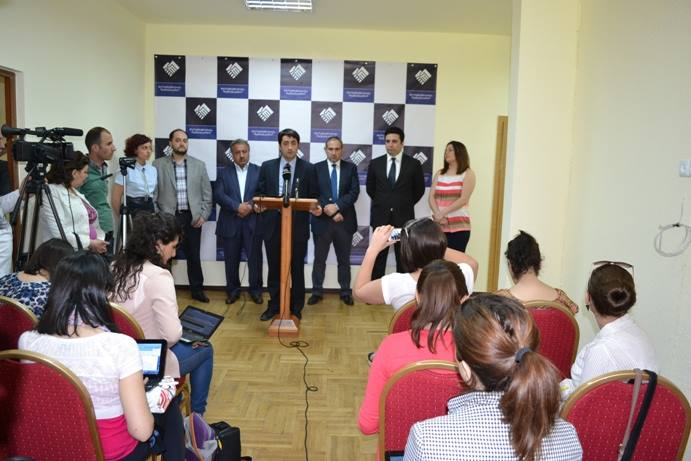
A press conference of the party, July 3, 2014

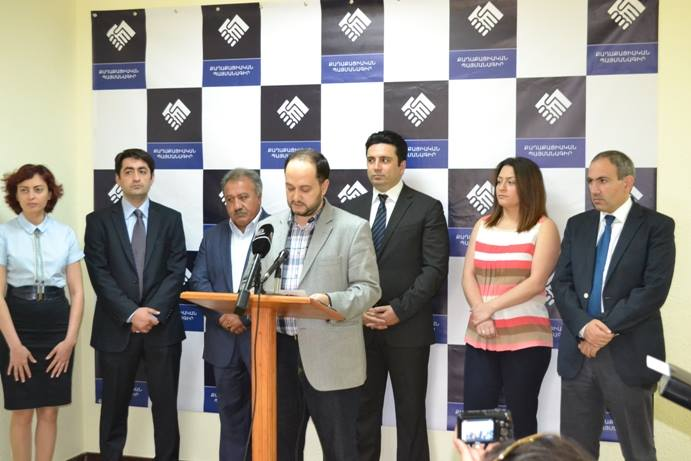
Civil Contract governing board in 2014

During the fifth convention of the party in June 2019, acting Minister of Territorial Administration and Infrastructures Suren Papikyan (currently minister of defense) was elected as chairman of the 21 member strong governing board.

Civil Contract's governing board was introduced on December 9, 2013 during a press conference at the Ani Plaza Hotel. It was formed to organize the first party convention.

The current governing board is:

- Arayik Harutyunyan, historian, former minister of education
- Alen Simonyan, president of parliament
- Nikol Pashinyan, former journalist, former MP, prime minister
- Suren Papikyan, chairman of the governing board, minister of defense
- Ruben Rubinyan, vice-president of the board, vice-president of parliament
- Eduard Aghajanyan, MP
- Tigran Avinyan, former deputy prime minister, mayor of Yerevan
- Hakob Arshakyan, vice-president of parliament
- Ararat Mirzoyan, minister of foreign affairs
- Vilen Gabrielyan, MP
- Romanos Petrosyan, former minister of the environment, governor of Kotayk Province
- Arsen Torosyan, former minister of health, MP
- Narek Babyan
- Arman Boshyan
- Lilit Makunts, ambassador of Armenia to the United States
- Sipan Pashinyan
- Mkhitar Hayrapetyan, former minister of the diaspora, MP
- Vahagn Hovakimyan
- Armen Pambukhchyan
- Arpine Davoyan, MP

== Finances ==
The Civil Contract Return Fund was established to ensure that the party's funding complies with Armenian law and its activities are democratically organized. Funds donated to Civil Contract will be stored in the fund's account and vault. Accounting will be conducted under the supervision of the board of trustees, which is independent of the governing board and controls the fund's expenditures. According to the party's contract, "Citizens who have donated money or property to the Contract shall have the right to request information on spending, and their demands are to be satisfied within three days' time."

== Board of trustees ==
The Civil Contract board of trustees was announced on February 22, 2014. Haykak Arshamyan was elected chairman, and Hakob Simidyan was appointed director of the fund. Members are:

- Lara Aharonian, Women's Resource Center co-founder, director
- Haykak Arshamyan, historian
- Levon Bagramyan, economist, political scientist, Washington, D.C.
- Arthur Ispiryan, musician
- Levon Hovsepyan, economist
- Ara Shirinyan, director
- Maro Matossian, Women's Support Center director
- Edgar Manukyan, Toronto, Canada
- Sargis Kloyan, businessperson

== Funding ==
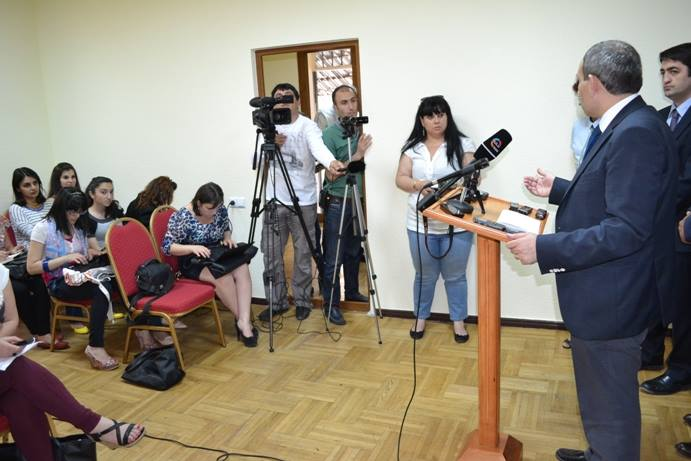
July 3, 2014 press conference

The Civil Contract governing board published "Financing Politics and Civil Contract", an article touching on the issues of fiscal transparency and financing public and political life in Armenia, on April 26, 2014:

Financing politics is one of the essential entangled knots of the history of the Third Republic. How is the public-political activity financed in Armenia? It's a question the proper answer of which is not known. One can guess, put forward hypotheses, but the society does not have a reliable and verifiable answer to the question ... The most popular answer is that "we are funded by thousands of our supporters". This is an answer, which generates new questions: whom and how do the supporters give the money? Who takes it and under what conditions? How do others learn whether their retainer has donated that much, more or less money ...? From the very first stage of the debates over establishing "civil contract" public–political union the issues about funding the activities of the contract have been the subject of heated debate. How is the contract going to be financed? Who will be financing it? The answers to these questions were principal for us. And if we have serious ambition to achieve fundamental changes in public–political relations, we need to try to work ourselves out of the Armenian traditional funding mechanisms of political activity. We have formulated the problem the following way: if we need 1000 AMD, we need to find not a single person that will give us that money, but we need to find 1000 people each of whom will donate 1 AMD.

== Electoral record ==
=== Parliamentary elections ===
Election	Alliance	Votes	%	Seats	+/–	Position	Government
2017	part of Way Out Alliance	122,049	7.78	5 / 105	New	3rd	Opposition (2017–2018)
2017	part of Way Out Alliance	122,049	7.78	5 / 105	New	3rd	Government (2018–2019)
2018	part of My Step Alliance	884,456	70.43	82 / 132	▲77	▲1st	Government
2021	Running independently	688,761	53.95	71 / 107	▼11	1st	Government
2026	Running independently	727,160	49.85	64 / 105	▼7	1st	Government

== See also ==
- Programs of political parties in Armenia
