= Khachatryan =

Khachatryan or Khachatrian (Armenian: Խաչատրյան) is an Armenian surname. Notable people with the surname include:

- Aleksandr Khachatryan (born 1947), Armenian actor
- Andranik Khachatryan (born 1956), Armenian footballer
- Ara Khachatryan (born 1982), Armenian weightlifter
- Arkadi Khachatryan (born 1975), Armenian politician
- Armine Khachatryan (born 1986), Armenian women's footballer
- Ashot Khachatryan (born 1959), Armenian footballer
- Edmond Khachatryan (born 1983), Armenian cross-country skier
- Eva Khachatryan (born 1990), Armenian actress
- Gagik Khachatryan, multiple people
- Garegin Khachatryan (1975–1995), Armenian sculptor, artist and a dissident
- Gevorg Khachatrian (1936–1996), Armenian scientist
- Harutyun Khachatryan (born 1955), Armenian film director
- Karen Khachatrian (born 1962), Armenian scientist
- Khachatur Khachatryan (born 1982), Armenian scientist and mathematician
- Kristine Khachatryan (born 1989), Armenian cross-country skier
- Maksim Khachatryan (born 2004), Russian and Armenian footballer
- Mamikon Khachatryan (born 2007), Armenian artistic gymnast
- Manvel Khachatryan (born 2004), Armenian Greco-Roman wrestler
- Marinka Khachatryan (born 1997), Armenian actress
- Mher Khachatryan (born 1989), Armenian actor
- Mher Khachatryan (painter) (born 1983), Armenian painter
- Rafik Khachatryan (1937–1993), Armenian sculptor
- Rima Khachatryan (1938–2020), Armenian educator, chemist, educational innovator, Honored Pedagogue of Armenia and author
- Romik Khachatryan (born 1978), Armenian football player
- Samson Khachatryan (born 1960), Armenian boxer
- Sargis Khachatryan (born 1964), Armenian footballer
- Sargis Khachatryan (wrestler) (born 1989), Brazilian wrestler
- Sergey Khachatryan (born 1985), Armenian violinist
- Shahen Khachatrian (1934–2021), Armenian art historian
- Suren Khachatryan (born 1956), Armenian politician
- Tiran Khachatryan (born 1977), Armenian general
- Vahagn Khachaturyan (born 1959), Armenian politician
- Vardan Khachatryan (born 1968), Armenian football player
- Vardan Khachatryan (politician) (1959–2026), Armenian politician
- Vigen Khachatryan (1951–2023), Armenian engineer and politician
- Vladik Khachatryan, politician from the Republic of Artsakh
- Zhores Khachatryan, Armenian archaeologist

== See also ==
- 18174 Khachatryan
- Khachaturian (surname)
