= Khachatur =

Khachatur (Armenian: Խաչատուր from խաչ (xačʿ, "cross") + տուր (tur, "something given" = "given by cross". It may refer to:

- Khachatur Abovian (1809–1848), Armenian writer and national public figure who mysteriously vanished in 1848 and was presumed dead
- Khachatur Araratian (1876–1937), Russian-Armenian general
- Khachatur Avetisyan (1926–1996), Armenian Soviet composer
- Khachatur Bezirjyan (born 1950), Armenian politician and physicist
- Khachatur Kesaratsi (1590–1646), Armenian archbishop, credited with the founding of the first printing press in Iran
- Khachatur Khachatryan (born 1982), Armenian scientist and mathematician
- Khachatur Karchikyan (1882–1918), Armenian politician
- Khachatur Kyapanaktsyan (1968–2007), Armenian weightlifter
- Khachatur Maloumian (1863–1915), Armenian journalist and political activist
- Khachatur Sukiasyan (born 1961), Armenian politician and businessman
- Khachatur of Taron (died 1184), Armenian poet and musician, writer of Sharakans
- Khachatur of Kaffa (died 1658), Crimean chronicler and priest

== See also ==
- Khachaturian (surname)
