= Vladić =

Vladić is a Serbo-Croatian surname, derived from the Slavic given name Vlad. It may refer to:

- Franjo Vladić, Bosnian Croat footballer
- Indira Vladić, Croatian singer
- Radoslav Vladić, Serbian academic
