= Daniel-Bek of Sassun =

Armenian politician

Daniel-Bek of Sassun (Ter Khachatryan (Russian: Данэл бек Тер-Хачатрянц, Armenian: Դանիել բեկ Տեր-Խաչատրյանց); 1785 in Sason, Ottoman Empire – 1829 in Muş, Ottoman Empire) was an Armenian Bek in Sassun (the province Sassun or Sason of Western Armenia) in the second half of the 18th century. His grandson was Khachatur-Bek of Mush (the town Mush of Western Armenia), who lived in the first half of the 19th century. Khachar and Garegin Khachatryan, both prominent Armenian artists and ideologists of Armenian liberation movement, were descendants of his House.

== Descendants of Daniel Bek of Sasun ==
- Daniel Bek Ter Khachatryan Даниэл бек (Sasun, Сасун, Սասուն 1785 - Mush, Муш, Մուշ,1829). From aristocratic family of southern branch of Bagratuni (Armenian: Բագրատունի) royal dynasty.
- son of Daniel bek - Avdal bek Ter Khachatryan, Авдал бек Тер-Хачатрянц, Ավդալ բեկ Տեր-Խաչատրյան (1805-1867).
- sons of Avdal bek - Jakob Bek Ter Khachatryan - Якоб бек Тер-Хачатрянц, Յակոբ` Հակոբ (1826-1889), Poghos bek, Погос бек, Պողոս` Պողսե, Tiflis, Samson bek, Самсон, Սամսոն, Germany.
- son of Jakob bek - Khachatur, Хачатур, Խաչատուր (1845-1916), Erivan governorate of Russian Empire
- son of Khachatur - Sirekan, Сирекан, Սիրեկան
- son of Sirekan- Garegin, Гарегин, Գարեգին (1900-1940)
- sons of Garegin - Ludvig, Людвиг (1935-1940), Rafik, Рафик (1937-1993), Razmik, Размик (1939-2008) and daughter Hripsimeh, Рипсимэ (1936).

== Prominent representatives of the Family ==
Rafik Khachatryan, Khachar, Рафик Гарегинович Хачатрян -Хачар (1937-1993)

Garegin Khachatryan, Гарегин Рафикович Хачатрян (1975-1995).

- Encyclopedia of Karabakh Liberation War. 1988-1994 (in Armenian)
- Armenian Encyclopedia, Yerevan, 2004
- N.Voronov, Sovetskaya monumentalnaya skulptura 1960-1980, Moscow, "Iskusstvo" Publishing House, 1984 (in Russian)
- Gohar Khostikyan, The Armenian Artists: biographical dictionary, Yerevan, 1993 (in Armenian) (unpublished).
- Albert Pharsadanyan, The Armenian: biographies of the prominent Armenians in one line, Yerevan, "VMV-print" Publishing House, 2004) (in Armenian)
- Whoe is Whoe, biographical encyclopedia, volume 2, page 724, Armenian Encyclopedia, Yerevan, 2007 (in Armenian).
- Khachar, biography and works - with photos, Samark Publishing House, September 7, 2007, Yerevan, (in Armenian).
- Rafo, Avangard, independent weekly, October 3–9, 2007, Yerevan, (in Armenian).
- The Master of the Stone Poetry (Qare Poeziayi Varpetn), "Hay Zinwor", the Official Weekly of the MOD, October 6–13, 2007, Yerevan, (in Armenian).
- Television Sujet about Khachar (Rafik Khachatryan), Yerevan Television Studio, October 7, 2007, Yerevan, (in Armenian).
- Television Sujet about Khachar (Rafik Khachatryan), ArmenAkob Television Studio, October 14, 2007, Yerevan, (in Armenian).
- Television Sujet about Khachar (Rafik Khachatryan), Zinuzh Television Studio, October 21, 2007, Yerevan, The 1st Channel of Armenia (Public Television 1st Channel) (in Armenian).
- Sasun Grigoryan, Musanera ch'lrecin, v.3, Yerevan, 2010, pages 67–67 (in Armenian).
