= David Sargsyan =

Armenian politician

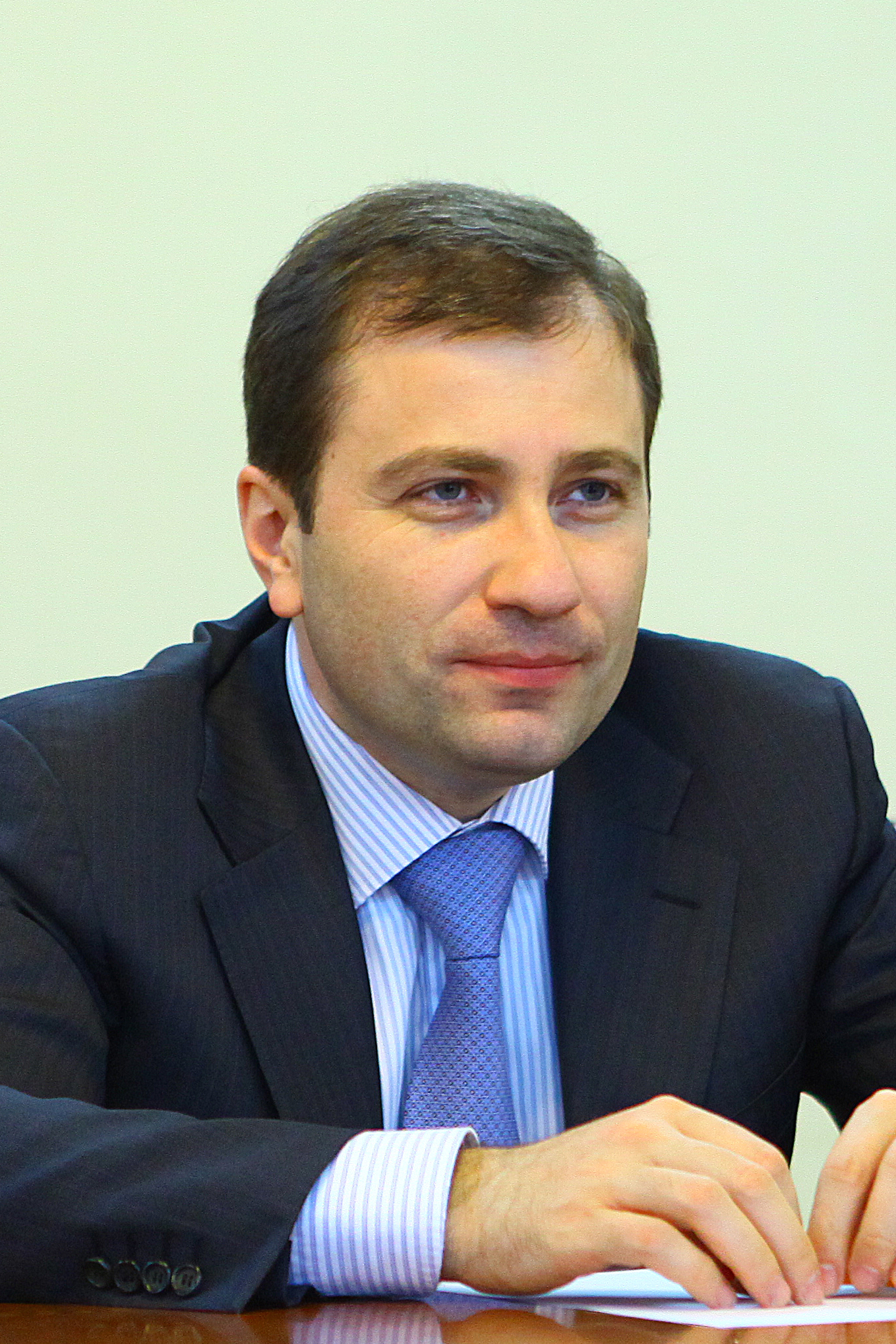

Minister of Finance of Armenia
- In office 9 May 2013 – 26 April 2014
- President: Serzh Sargsyan
- Preceded by: Vache Gabrielyan
- Succeeded by: Gagik Khachatryan

Chief of Staff (Secretary of the Cabinet) of the Government of Armenia
- In office 2008–2013

Personal details
- Born: 14 July 1977 (age 49) Yerevan, Armenia

David Sargsyan (Armenian: Դավիթ Ռաֆայելի Սարգսյան; born 14 July 1977) is an Armenian politician who served as the Minister of Finance of Armenia from 2013 to 2014. Prior to that, he held the position of the Chief of Staff (Secretary of the Cabinet) of the Government of Armenia from 2008 to 2013.

During his tenure at the executive authority, he initiated a number of reforms. As the Minister of Finance he headed the activities of piloting the issuance of Eurobonds for Armenia and assuring Armenia's access to international capital market.

Minister Sargsyan initiated a number of reforms in the field of public procurement to increase accountability and transparency of the process. One of the successes of this reform was the implementation of the E-procurement system, as well as improvement of the appealing procedures and the public control over them.

Another set of major reforms was in the area of public administration. One of the undertakings was to put clear distinction between the functions of political officials and staff in public administration bodies, policy makers, and public institutions offering state services. Another reform was targeted at the implementation of an electronic management system for the Government that consisted of 15 components, ranging from electronic document and workflow management system to a “one-stop-shop” that would allow registering a business in 15 minutes. It also included electronic system of applications for licenses and submission of reports of licensed entities; electronic system of government payments, etc.

As a result of undertaken reforms, the level of transparency of public administration bodies improved sharply, due to which Armenia became the first country in the world to disclose the government expenditures on-line on daily basis through the “interactive budget” application.

== Early life and education ==
Sargsyan was born in Yerevan on 14 July 1977. In 1994–1999, he studied in Yerevan State Institute of Economy, and in 1999–2002 he was a post-graduate student in the same higher educational institution. David Sargsyan holds PhD in economics.

== Career ==
Sargsyan embarked upon his career in the Ministry of Finance and Economy of Armenia in 1997. He initially worked as a Leading Specialist in Public Debt Management Department of the Ministry of Finance and Economy and later, in 1998–1999, he worked as a Chief Specialist in the External Debt Management Department of the Ministry of Finance and Economy of Armenia.

Sargsyan has spent around 9 years at the Central Bank of Armenia (CBA) at various positions. From 2006 to 2008, he was the Head of Financial System Policy and Analyses Department at the CBA. During 2002 to 2006 he headed the Banking Methodology and Analyses Department at the CBA. In 2002 he held the position of Banking Methodology and Regulation Division of Banking Methodology and Analyses Department. Prior to that, from 1999 to 2002, he was the Assistant to the Chairman of the CBA.

During his time at the CBA, Mr. Sargsyan was extensively involved in undertaken reforms. He developed and implemented the concept of unified regulation and supervision of financial system; national deposit guarantee system; mortgage financing and mortgage market development focused reforms, requirements and guidelines for internal control system for commercial banks; the concept for corporate governance in the banking sector; the risk based supervision concept and the Manual for Banking Supervision, the new Insurance Law and Insurance Supervision in line with EU standards; and implementation of Basel 2 standards in Armenia.

In 2004–2007, Mr. Sargsyan was the Secretary to the Regional Group of Banking Supervisors for Transcaucasus, Central Asia and Russian Federation. From 2001 through 2003, he was the Alternate Director at the Board of Directors of Black Sea Trade and Development Bank. From 2003 to 2008, he delivered lectures in Yerevan State Institute of Economy.

== Personal life ==
He is married and has one daughter and two sons.
