= Vladik =

Vladik is a given name. Notable people with the name include:

- A nickname or short form for Vladislav
- Vladik Dzhabarov, Soviet soldier and world-class cyclist
- Vladik Khachatryan, Nagorno-Karabakh politician
- Vladik Kreinovich, Russian-American professor of computer science

== See also ==
- Samile the Vladik, bishop and witness to the Fall of Constantinople
- Vlad
