= Edward Sandoyan =

Armenian-Russian economist

Edward Sandoyan Էդվարդ Սանդոյան
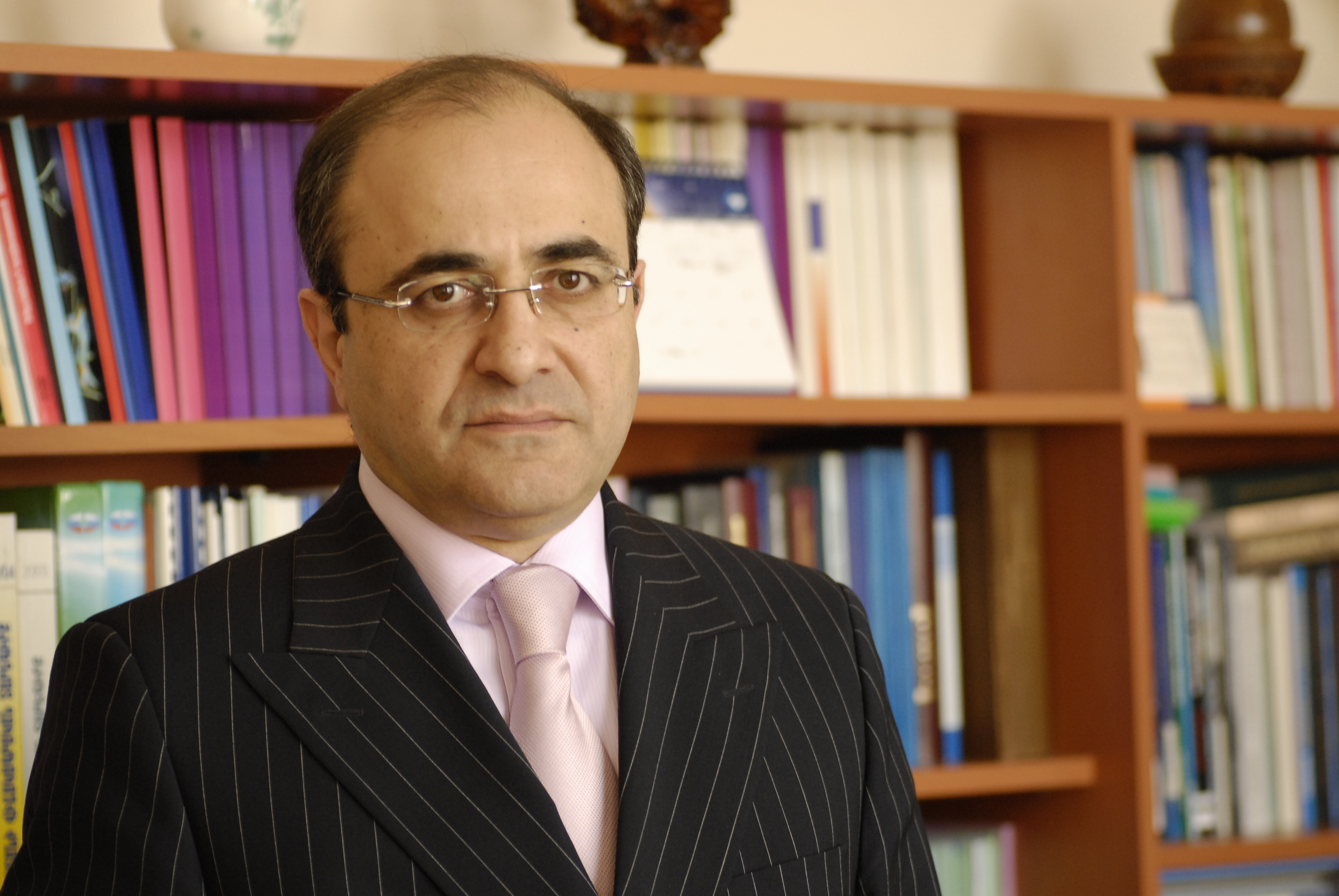

Minister of Finance & Economy of Armenia
- In office 20 April 1998 – 15 June 1999
- President: Robert Kocharyan
- Preceded by: Armen Darbinyan
- Succeeded by: Levon Barkhudaryan

Personal details
- Born: June 4, 1961 Yerevan, Armenian SSR, Soviet Union
- Education: Yerevan State Polytechnic Institute
- Profession: Economist
- Website: Official website

Edward Martini Sandoyan (Armenian: Էդվարդ Սանդոյան) (born June 4, 1961 in Yerevan), is a doctor of Economic Sciences of Armenia and the Russian Federation, professor, and served as Minister of Finance & Economy of Armenia from 1998 to 1999. He is the rector of Russian-Armenian University since June 2023.

Dr. Sandoyan studied at the Moscow Institute of Management (currently State University of Management) from 1978 to 1981 and graduated with a degree in management and mechanical engineering. He started higher education at the Yerevan State Polytechnic Institute (currently National Polytechnic University of Armenia) at the Faculty of Economics and Management in Mechanical Engineering in 1981, from which he graduated with honors in 1983. Dr. Sandoyan has done his postgraduate studies from 1983 to 1987 at the Yerevan State Polytechnic Institute (currently National Polytechnic University of Armenia) at the Department of Economics, Organization and Management in the National Economy and Industries. He continued his doctoral studies in economics at the Academy of National Economy under the Government of the Russian Federation (Russian Presidential Academy of National Economy and Public Administration) from 1993 to 1994. He received the degree of Doctor of Sciences in economics in 2008.

== Professional Experience ==
Dr. Edward Sandoyan has experience in financial, educational and science sectors of Armenia. He started his academic career in Yerevan State Polytechnic Institute (currently National Polytechnic University of Armenia) in 1983 as researcher, and became Associate Professor of the Faculty of Economics and Management of Machine-Building Industry, where he worked until 1991. In 1990 (July–September) was appointed Deputy Chairman of the Board of the commercial bank "Masis". In 1990-1991. was appointed President of the Menua Insurance Company. In 1991-1993 E. Sandoyan was appointed the Deputy Chief of the Tax Inspectorate of the Republic of Armenia – Deputy Minister, Head of the Main Department of Regulation, Supervision and Licensing at the Central Bank of Armenia, and the Minister of Finance and Economy. He has been the President of CJSC "Armaudit Service" and Deputy Chairman of the Board of Commercial Bank "Albank" from 1993 to 1994. In 1994 he was appointed to the position of the Head of the Main Department for Supervision, Regulation and Licensing of the Central Bank of the Republic of Armenia. From 1995 to 1997 he received professional qualifications from the Federal Reserve Bank (Cleveland, Ohio, USA), the Bank of England (London), the National Bank of France (Paris), the National Bank of the Netherlands (Amsterdam).

In 1998 Edward Sandoyan became the Minister of Finance and Economy of the Republic of Armenia until 1999. Afterwards he worked as the General Executive Director, Chairman of the Board of "Armagrobank" OJSC for one year. From December 2000 to November 2002 he was the Deputy Chairman of the Association of Banks of Armenia. From January 2000 to May 2004 he worked as Associate Professor of the Department of Labor Economics of the Armenian State University of Economics. At the same time he has been the Chairman of the Supervisory Board of SRO "Armenian Stock Exchange" (February 2001 – April 2003) and Deputy Chairman of the Board of "Armsberbank" CJSC, Chairman of the Bank's Strategic Development Committee (September 2001 – April 2004), becoming the Advisor to the Chairman of the Board in 2004.

Dr. Sandoyan has been the Head of the Business School of the State Educational Institution of Higher Professional Education of the Russian-Armenian (Slavonic) University since September 2009, Professor of the Russian-Armenian (Slavonic) University, Head of the Department of Economics and Finance, Member of the Academic Council of the University since March 2002. From June 2004 – May 2012 he has been the Vice-Rector for the Development of University Education of the Russian-Armenian University. Since 2012 he was the Director, Chairman of the Academic Council of the Institute of Economics and Business of the Russian-Armenian University. In June 2023 he was appointed to the position of the rector of Russian-Armenian University.

From 2009 to 2014 was a member of the Specialized Council 014 of the Higher Attestation Commission of the Republic of Armenia at the Armenian State University of Economics. From 2014 to May 2023, he has been the Deputy Chairman, since June 2023 Chairman of the Specialized Council 008 of the Higher Attestation Commission of the Republic of Armenia, operating at the Russian-Armenian University.

Since 2022, Edward Sandoyan is a full member (Academic) of the Academy of Pedagogical and Psychological Sciences of Armenia, a member of the Presidium of the Academy.

== Other activities ==
Edward Sandoyan is a member of the editorial board of the journal "Bulletin of the Russian-Armenian) University (series: humanities and social sciences)", included in the RSCI, and "Collection of scientific articles based on materials of annual scientific conferences (series: humanities and social sciences) RAU".

He is also a member of the editorial board of the following foreign scientific journals included in SCOPUS and / or RSCI: Belarusian Economic Journal (Minsk, Republic of Belarus), Theory and Practice of Social Development (Krasnodar, RF), Society: Politics, Economics, Law (Krasnodar, RF), Society: Sociology, Psychology, Pedagogics (Krasnodar, RF), Society: Philosophy, History, Culture (Krasnodar, RF), Journal of New Economy (Yekaterinburg, RF), Journal of Economic Regulation (Rostov-on-Don, RF), World of Economics and Management (Novosibirsk, RF), Transition Studies Review (Rome, Italy), Global Policy and Governance (Rome, Italy), Ekonomické Trendy (Economic Trends) (Prague, Czech Republic), Finance: Theory and Practice (Moscow, Financial University under the Government of the Russian Federation).

== Awards ==
In 2010, E.M. Sandoyan was awarded the highest award of the Ministry of Education and Science of the Republic of Armenia - the Gold Medal for Academic and Scientific Achievements. In 2013, he was awarded the “Drastamat Kanayan” medal by the Ministry of Defense of the Republic of Armenia. In 2014, by the decree of the President of the Republic of Armenia Dr. Sandoyan was awarded the state award of the Republic of Armenia - the medal of Movses Khorenatsi. In September 2022, the Ministry of Science and Higher Education of the Russian Federation awarded him with gratitude for his significant contribution to the development of education, conscientious work, and also in connection with the celebration of the 25th anniversary of the founding of the Russian-Armenian University․

E. Sandoyan was the winner of the Prize of the Eurasian Economic Club of Scientists (Astana) for the best report of the forum on the topic: "The economic security of Eurasia in the system of global risks" in the nomination "The global financial crisis: causes and ways to minimize the consequences։ Anti-crisis recommendations for G-20 countries” (2009). From 2013 to 2021 was annually recognized as the winner of the "Productive Researcher" competition in the "Social Sciences" section (Top 100) of the Science Committee of the Ministry of Education, Science, Culture and Sports of the RA.

Dr. Sandoyan was awarded the Gold Medal of the Russian-Armenian University (2011) and the Gold Medal of the State Engineering University of Armenia (2003). He was awarded the academic title "Honorary Professor" of the Association "Eurasian Economic Club of Scientists" (2008), as well as of the Ural State University of Economics (2011). Since 2017 he is the Honorary Professor of Mesrop Mashtots University (Stepanakert). In 2013 he was given the award the Academician S.A. Sitaryan, established by the RAU for work in the field of economics, aimed at implementing the strategy of Armenia's economic breakthrough.

== Scientific activities ==
Author of more than 307 published scientific papers, monographs, textbooks and manuals for about 464 printed sheets, as well as more than 60 newspaper articles. He has been the scientific supervisor of 36 PhD students in economics and 1 ScD (Doctor of science).

Political offices
Preceded by Armen Darbinyan	Minister of Finance of the Republic of Armenia; 1998-1999	Succeeded by Levon Barkhudaryan
