= AIESEC =

Student not-for-profit organization

- Formation: 1948
- Type: Nonprofit organization
- Legal status: Active
- Purpose: Peace and fulfillment of humankind's potential
- Headquarters: Montreal, Canada
- Location: 5605 Avenue de Gaspé, Suite 110, Montréal, QC H2T 2A4, Canada
- Region served: Worldwide
- Members: 40,000
- Official language: English
- President of AIESEC International (PAI): Aleyna Sayin
- Main organ: Global Plenary
- Website: aiesec.org

AIESEC (/ˈaɪsɛk/ EYE-sek) is an international "youth-run" and led, non-governmental and not-for-profit organization that provides young people with business development internships. The organization focuses on empowering young people to make a progressive social impact. The AIESEC network includes approximately 40,000 members in 120+ countries.

AIESEC is a non-governmental in consultative status with the United Nations Economic and Social Council (ECOSOC), is an independent arm of the UN DPI and UN's Office of the Secretary-General's Envoy on Youth, member of ICMYO, and is recognized by UNESCO. AIESEC's international headquarters are in Montreal, Canada.

== Name ==
AIESEC (pronounced: eye-sek) was originally a French acronym for Association internationale des étudiants en sciences économiques et commerciales (English: International Association of Students in Economics and Business). The full name is no longer officially used, as members can now be graduate and undergraduate from any university background.

== History ==
=== Founding ===
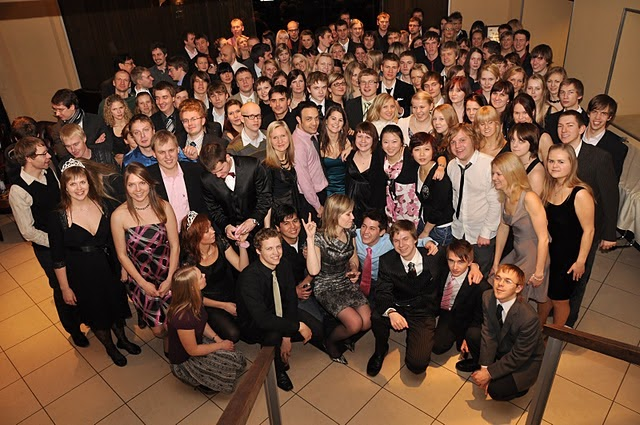
AIESEC in Estonia

The idea behind AIESEC started after World War II, when representatives from schools across Europe exchanged information about various programs and schools that specialized in business and economics. Students had been carrying out internships in other countries, mostly on their own initiative, but this came to a standstill with the onslaught of World War II. In 1944, the neutral Scandinavian countries were still exchanging students. Bertil Hedberg, an official at the Stockholm School of Economics, and students Jaroslav Zich (of Czechoslovakia) and Stanislas Callens (of Belgium), founded AIESEC on July 2, 1948, under the name Association Internationale des Etudiants en Sciences Economiques (AIESEc) with a headquarter in Prague and Jaroslav Zich as the first President of the association.

At the time of AIESEC's founding at the end of the 1940s, Europe was in the midst of recovery from the war that dealt grave losses. Factories and enterprises were in desperate need of executives, managers and leaders. The continent needed more than just business development, however; the war had severely damaged relations between European nations, and many members of the community felt steps needed to be taken to address this problem. AIESEC was formed to address both of these concerns. In 1948, a renewing development of the association was initiated, with implementation of international meetings (congresses), replacing the practice of governance from the headquarter. The first broad meeting was held by students from 9 universities of 7 countries in April 1948 in Liège (Belgium). Then the official, constitutive assembly (the congress) was organized in 1949 in Stockholm with Bengt Sjӧstrand as the President and Sweden as the Presiding Country for 1949/1950. Students from seven nations: Belgium, Denmark, Finland, France, Netherlands, Norway and Sweden, came together for that first International Congress of AIESEC.

In 1949, 89 students were exchanged by AIESEC among the member nations. The next two annual congresses were conducted in Stockholm, presided by Bengt Sjӧstrand, and in Paris, presided by Jean Choplin, respectively. At those congresses the organization's mission was stated: "to expand the understanding of a nation by expanding the understanding of the individuals, changing the world one person at a time." Also a constitution for the organization defined a purpose: "AIESEC is an independent, non-political, and international organization which has as its purpose to establish and promote the friendly relations between the members."

=== Global expansion ===
The organization grew exponentially in the following years, with more than 1,000 exchanges taking place in 1955 alone. In the following few years, AIESEC quickly became global by establishing its first North American member, the United States, in 1957, and its first South American and African members, Colombia, Venezuela, and South Africa, in 1958.

For the first years of its existence, AIESEC had no central governing body, but was instead managed jointly by a Presiding Country Committee composed of the National Committee presidents of each member nation. As the organization grew, a central governing body was created and led by a democratically elected Secretary General. Morris Wolff, from the United States, was chosen as the first Secretary General in 1960, and established the first permanent international office for AIESEC in Geneva, Switzerland. Over the following decade, AIESEC expanded to eastern Asia, Australia, and deeper within Europe, Africa, North America, and South America, having a presence in 43 countries by 1969.

In 2010, AIESEC surpassed 10,000 exchanges delivered in a single year for the first time. By 2020, more than 230,000 interactions will have been provided.

== Programs ==
=== Membership ===
AIESEC members are typically young people aged 18 to 30 who participate in the organization's leadership, management, and exchange programs. Members take part in organizing events, facilitating international internships, and managing local chapters worldwide. The membership model emphasizes leadership development, cultural exchange, and global networking.

=== Global Volunteer ===
Global Volunteer is an international, 4–8-week exchange program powered by AIESEC for young people (aged 18–30) to work on social impact projects. Participants contribute to the UN Sustainable Development Goals (SDGs) while developing leadership, cross-cultural understanding, and personal growth. Projects often focus on education, health, or the environment.

=== Global Talent ===
Global Talent is a professional internship program under AIESEC that places young adults, generally between 18 and 30 years old, in startups, small and medium enterprises, or multinational corporations abroad. The internships last from six weeks to one and a half years depending on the placement. Participants gain practical work experience, develop cross-cultural competencies, and build global professional networks, with support from AIESEC throughout the application, placement, and logistical process.

=== Global Teacher ===
Global Teacher is a teaching internship program offered by AIESEC, aimed at individuals aged 18–30 with prior teaching experience and language proficiency. Internships typically last between six and seventy-eight weeks and include responsibilities such as lesson planning, classroom management, and intercultural engagement. The program provides salary or stipend support, professional development opportunities, and logistical assistance including visa processing, accommodation, and onboarding. AIESEC collaborates with over 300 educational institutions across more than 35 countries, involving more than 1,000 young educators annually.

== Global Host program ==
Global Host is an AIESEC program that enables individuals and organizations to host international interns and volunteers locally. The program supports cultural exchange and global understanding by providing opportunities for young people from various countries to live and work within host communities and businesses. Hosts engage with diverse cultures while facilitating the personal and professional development of participants. The program operates in multiple countries and partners with startups, SMEs, NGOs, and other organizations offering practical work experiences and community projects.

== Awards and recognition ==
In July 2015 AIESEC was recognized for the ninth time on the WorldBlu list of "Most Freedom Centred Workplaces." Organizations are included on the list based on a Freedom at Work assessment completed by employees. The assessment evaluates organizational design on a spectrum from fear-based to freedom-centred across leadership, individual performance, and systems and processes.

== Members ==
As of 2023 AIESEC is found in 95 countries and territories worldwide, including:

- Albania
- Algeria
- Argentina
- Armenia
- Australia
- Austria
- Azerbaijan
- Bahrain
- Bangladesh
- Belgium
- Benin
- Bolivia
- Bosnia and Herzegovina
- Brazil
- Bulgaria
- Burkina Faso
- Cambodia
- Cameroon
- Canada
- Chile
- China
- Colombia
- Costa Rica
- Croatia
- Czech Republic
- Denmark
- Dominican Republic
- Ecuador
- Egypt
- El Salvador
- Estonia
- Ethiopia
- Finland
- France
- Georgia
- Germany
- Ghana
- Greece
- Guatemala
- Hong Kong
- Hungary
- Iceland
- India
- Indonesia
- Italy
- Cote D'Ivoire
- Japan
- Jordan
- Kazakhstan
- Kenya
- Kuwait
- Kyrgyzstan
- Latvia
- Lebanon
- Liberia
- Lithuania
- Malaysia
- Mexico
- Moldova
- Mongolia
- Montenegro
- Morocco
- Mozambique
- Myanmar
- Nepal
- Netherlands
- New Zealand
- Nicaragua
- Nigeria
- North Macedonia
- Norway
- Pakistan
- Panama
- Paraguay
- Peru
- Philippines
- Poland
- Portugal
- Romania
- Russia
- Rwanda
- Senegal
- Serbia
- Singapore
- Slovakia
- South Africa
- South Korea
- Spain
- Sri Lanka
- Sweden
- Switzerland
- Taiwan
- Tanzania
- Thailand
- Togo
- Tunisia
- Turkey
- Uganda
- Ukraine
- United Arab Emirates
- United Kingdom
- United States
- Venezuela
- Vietnam

== President of AIESEC International (PAI) ==
The President of AIESEC International (PAI) is the highest executive office within the global organization. The PAI is elected annually at the International Congress (IC) by the Global Plenary, which consists of the National presidents (MCPs) of all member entities.

Organizational Mandate Shift (2020)

Historically the AIESEC International team mandate ran from September 1 to August 31 of the following year. In 2020, following an organizational decision led by the "Transitional Team" during the COVID-19 pandemic, the mandate was shifted to align with the calendar year (January 1 to December 31). This change was officially implemented starting with the 2021 term led by Eva Dutary.

Term	President of AIESEC International	Nationality
2026	Aleyna Sayin	Turkey
2025	Arfan Nazar	Sri Lanka
2024	Ana Leonor Fernandes	Portugal
2023	Chester Shum	Hong Kong
2022	Louise Kim	Australia
2021	Eva Dutary	Panama
2019–2020	Alexandra Robinson	United States
2018–2019	Mohamed Fadel	Egypt
2017–2018	Abdelrahman Ayman	Egypt
2016–2017	Niels Caszo	India
2015–2016	Ana Saldarriaga	Colombia
2014–2015	Vinícius Tsugue	Brazil
2013–2014	Rolf Schmachtenberg	Norway
2012–2013	Florent Mei	China
2011–2012	Tatiana Mykhailiuk	Ukraine
2010–2011	Hugo Pereira	Portugal
2009–2010	Aman Jain	India
2008–2009	Juan Cajiao	Costa Rica
2007–2008	Gabriela Albescu	Romania
2006–2007	Edyson David Dos Santos Gamez	Venezuela
2005–2006	Brodie Boland	Canada
2004–2005	Rajiv Chandna	India
2003–2004	Pedro Santos	Portugal
2002–2003	Evrim Sen	Turkey
2001–2002	Sahil Kaul	India
2000–2001	José Pablo Retana	Costa Rica
1999–2000	Muratcan Ustunkaya	Turkey
1998–1999	Heather Blahnik	United States
1997–1998	Pedro Gabriel Huerta	Germany
1996–1997	Marianne Knuth	Denmark
1995–1996	Darin Rovere	Canada
1994–1995	Markus Leonhard Keiper	Germany
1993–1994	Oliver Mack	United Kingdom
1992–1993	Fernando Carro	Germany
1991–1992	Fernando Carro	Germany
1990–1991	Lennart Bjurstrom	Sweden
1989–1990	Michael Stewart	United States
1988–1989	Matthew de Villiers	South Africa
1987–1988	Anthony Pangilinan	Philippines
1986–1987	Martin Bean	Australia
1985–1986	Athos Staub	Switzerland
1984–1985	Vikram Gandhi	India
1983–1984	Robby van Den Wyngaert	Belgium
1982–1983	Dirk Ketele	Belgium
1981–1982	David Jackson-Grose	Australia
1980–1981	Joan Wilson	Canada
1979–1980	Per Otto Hyland	Sweden
1978–1979	Stefano Bridelli	Italy
1977–1978	Albert Pelach Paniker	Spain
1976–1977	Arnstein Endresen	Norway
1975–1976	Tom Davies	Canada
1974–1975	Leo G. Victorio	Philippines
1973–1974	Volker T. Wiegmann	Germany
1972–1973	Wolfgang Sekira	Austria
1971–1972	David Dempsey	Ireland
1970–1971	Pierre Pailleret	France
1969–1970	William Boyd Griffin	United States
1968–1969	Oyvind Sorbroden	Denmark
1967–1968	Antony B. Harris	United Kingdom
1966–1967	Antony B. Harris	United Kingdom
1965–1966	Antony B. Harris	United Kingdom
1964–1965	John C. Hartley	United Kingdom
1963–1964	John C. Hartley	United Kingdom
1962–1963	J. J. Elkin	Canada
1961–1962	Victor H. Loewenstein	United Kingdom
1960–1961	Robert W. Andrews	United Kingdom
1960–1961	Morris H. Wolff	United States
1959–1960	Ramon Pont y Amenós	Spain
1958–1959	Bernd M. Thomas	Germany
1957–1958	Karl Fleischhacker	Austria
1956–1957	Vittorio Tanzi	Italy
1955–1956	Jean de Vaulchier	France
1954–1955	Onno Kamerling	Netherlands
1953–1954	Lauri Naykki	Finland
1952–1953	Albert Kaltenhaler	Germany
1951–1952	Kaj Verner Slot	Denmark
1950–1951	Jean Choplin	France
1949–1950	Bengt Sjostrand	Sweden
1948–1949	Jaroslav Zich	Czechoslovakia

== Alumni ==
This is a non-exhaustive list of notable AIESEC alumni:

- Akshay Chaturvedi, CEO of Leverage Education.
- Aleksander Kwaśniewski, President of Poland from 1995 to 2005.
- Andrei Spînu, Deputy Prime Minister and Minister of Infrastructure and Regional Development of the Republic of Moldova.
- Aníbal Cavaco Silva, former Prime minister and President of Portugal
- Anthony Pangilinan, Filipino businessman and media personality who was the first Filipino to be elected international president of AIESEC
- Aziz Akhannouch, Prime Minister of Morocco since 2021.
- César Gaviria, Colombian economist and politician who served as the President of Colombia from 1990 to 1994, Secretary General of the Organization of American States from 1994 to 2004.
- Denny Abdi, secretary general of the Indonesian foreign ministry.
- Francisco Gil Díaz, Mexican economist and Secretary of Finance during 2000–2006, and current regional chairman for Telefónica Movistar.
- Fernando Carro (businessman), Spanish business director currently CEO of Bayern Leverkusen.
- Gunter Pauli – is an entrepreneur, economist, and author.
- Helmut Kohl, former German Chancellor.
- James Shaw, Minister of Statistics and Climate Change Issues of New Zealand.
- Janez Drnovšek, former Prime Minister of Slovenia.
- Junichiro Koizumi, former Prime Minister of Japan.
- Mario Monti, former Prime Minister of Italy
- Martti Ahtisaari, the tenth President of Finland (1994–2000), Nobel Peace Prize laureate and United Nations diplomat and mediator
- Moulay Hafid Elalamy, Former Minister of Industry, Trade, & New Technologies in Morocco until 2021.
- Nerses Yeritsyan, Deputy Chairman of the Central Bank of Armenia, former Minister of Economy of Armenia
- Nadia Calviño, President of the European Investment Bank since January 2024.

== See also ==
- United Nations
- IAESTE
