= Ministry of Finance (Armenia) =

Government ministry of Armenia

Ministry of Finance of Armenia
- Հայաստանի ֆինանսների նախարարություն

Agency overview
- Formed: 1918
- Jurisdiction: Government of Armenia
- Headquarters: 1 Melik-Adamyan, Yerevan 0010, Yerevan
- Minister responsible: Vahe Hovhannisyan, Minister of Finance
- Website: www.minfin.am

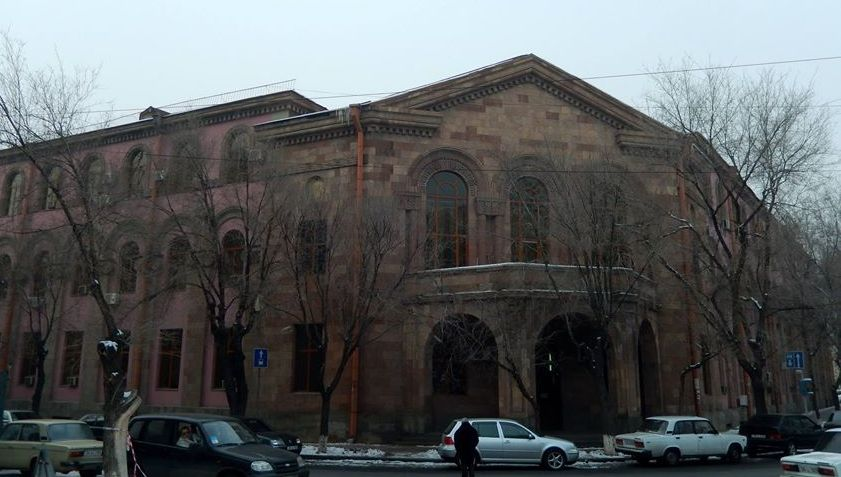
Headquarters of the ministry

The Ministry of Finance of Armenia (Armenian: Հայաստանի Ֆինանսների նախարարություն) is a republican body of executive authority, which elaborates and implements the policies of the Republic of Armenia Government in the areas of fiscal revenue collection, public finance administration.

== Former Ministers ==
=== First Republic of Armenia ===
- Khachatur Karchikyan (06.07.1918-04.11.1918)
- Artashes Enfiajyan (04.11.1918-24.06.1919)
- Grigor Jaghetyan (24.06.1919-05.08.1919)
- Sargis Araratyan (10.08.1919-05.05.1920)
- Abraham Gyulkhandanyan (05.05.1920-23.11.1920)
- Hambardzum Terteryan (25.11.1920-02.12.1920)

=== Republic of Armenia ===
- Janik Janoyan (18.09.1990-16.02.1993)
- Levon Barkhudaryan (1993-1997)
- Armen Darbinyan (15.05.1997-10.04.1998)
- Edward Sandoyan (20.04.1998-15.06.1999)
- Levon Barkhudaryan (15.06.1999-11.11.2000)
- Vardan Khachatryan (11.11.2000-09.04.2008)
- Tigran Davtyan (21.04.2008-17.12.2010)
- Vache Gabrielyan (17.12.2010-09.04.2013)
- Davit Sargsyan (09.05.2013-26.04.2014)
- Gagik Khachatryan (26.04.2014-20.09.2016)
- Vartan Aramyan (20.09.2016-12.05.2018)
- Atom Janjughazyan (12.05.2018-02.08.2021)
- Tigran Khachatryan (03.08.2021-20.12.2022)
- Vahe Hovhannisyan (20.12.2022-present)
