= Garegin Khachatryan =

- Born: 17 September 1975; Yerevan, Armenian SSR, Soviet Union
- Died: 2 September 1995 (aged 19)
- Occupation(s): sculptor, artist, and freedom fighter
- Awards: "Medal for Bravery" of Armenia

Garegin Khachatryan (Armenian: Գարեգին Ռաֆիկի Խաչատրյան; 17 September 1975 – 2 September 1995) was an Armenian sculptor, artist, and freedom fighter.

== Biography ==
Garegin Khachatryan was born in Yerevan, 17 September 1975. Son of Rafik Khachatryan - Khachar Afo - who was a sculptor of the Union of the Artists of the USSR and Armenia and a young (13 years old) and brave participant of the National Liberation movement of Armenians: he was a Soldier of Armenian National Liberation Legion (Azgayin Legion or National Legeon, from 1988, aged thirteen, to 1994 when he was 19 years old. He was a "spetsnaz" and paratrooper in a volunteer battalion "Artsiv 4" (Eagle 4). His father Rafik Khachatryan was in the Headquarters of the Independence Army of Armenia. Garegin Khachatryan graduate of an Armenian High school, as well as of Art College in Yerevan. He was a volunteer in the self-defense forces and had a good training in volunteer troops as a special force and paratrooper. He was a brave defender of the borders of Armenia and a volunteer participant of self-defense operations in the border areas of Armenia and Nagorno Karabakh.

He was awarded with the "Medal for Bravery" of Armenia.

Freedom fighter and composer Davit Amalyan (David Amalian) in late September 1995 dedicated a great song to Garegin Khachatryan.

He was a direct descendant of the house of Daniel-Bek of Sassun (province Sassun or Sason of Western Armenia) (second half of the 18th century) and Khachatur-Bek of Mush (town Mush of Western Armenia) (first half of the 19th century).
