= Hasköy District =

District of Muş Province, Turkey

- District
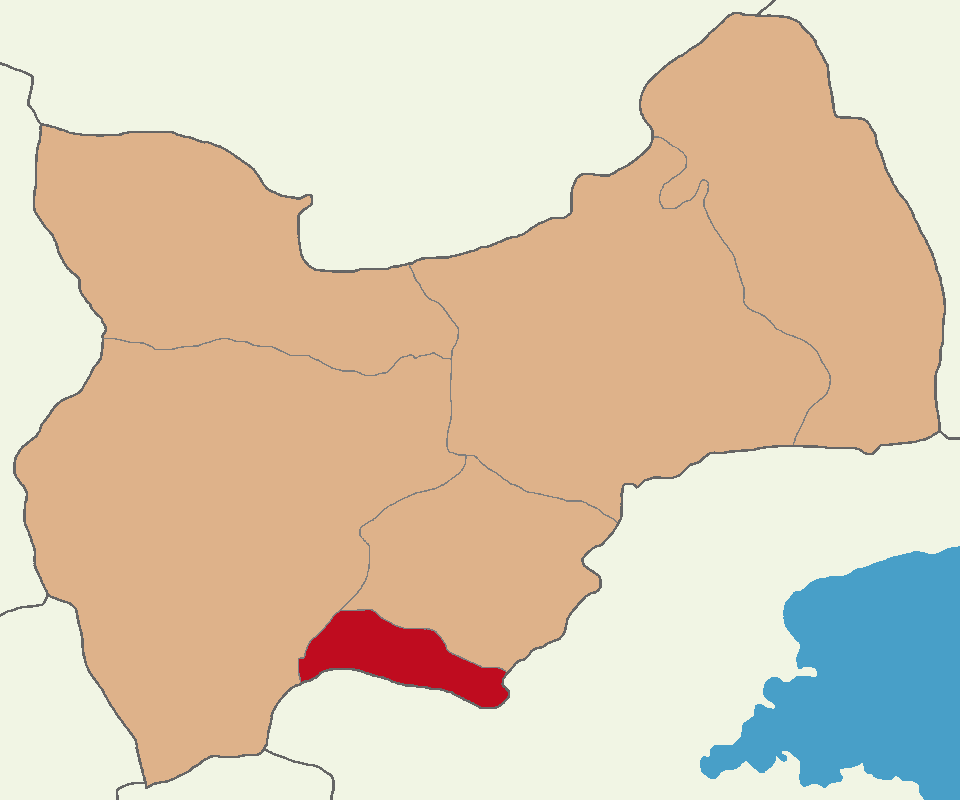
- Map showing Hasköy District in Muş Province

- Location in Turkey
- Coordinates: 38°41′N 41°41′E
- Country: Turkey
- Province: Muş
- Seat: Hasköy

Government
  - Kaymakam: Mücahit Öztürk
- Area: 264 km^{2} (102 sq mi)
- Population (2022): 25,621
  - Density: 97/km^{2} (250/sq mi)
- Time zone: UTC+3 (TRT)
- Website: www.haskoy.gov.tr

Hasköy District is a district of the Muş Province of Turkey. Its seat is the town of Hasköy. Its area is 264 km^{2}, and its population is 25,621 (2022).

== Composition ==
There are two municipalities in Hasköy District:

- Düzkışla
- Hasköy

There are 17 villages in Hasköy District:

- Aşağıüçdam
- Azıklı
- Böğürdelen
- Büvetli
- Dağdibi
- Elmabulak
- Eşmepınar
- Gökyazı
- Karakütük
- Koçköy
- Koğuktaş
- Ortanca
- Otaç
- Sarıbahçe
- Umurca
- Yarkaya
- Yukarıüçdam
