= Gagik Khachatryan =

Gagik Khachatryan may refer to:

- Gagik Khachatryan (politician)
- Gagik Khachatryan (weightlifter)
