= Khachaturian (surname) =

Khachaturian, Khachaturyan, Khachadurian or Khachatourian is an Armenian surname meaning cross bearer. Notable people with the surname include:

== Real people ==
- Andrey Khachaturyan (born 1987), Belarusian footballer
- Antranik Khachaturian (born 1975), American musician
- Aram Khachaturian (1903–1978), Soviet Armenian composer
- Ardashes Der-Khachadourian (1931–1993), Armenian linguist
- Artur Khachaturyan (born 1992), Armenian basketball player
- Emin Khachaturian (1930–2000), Armenian conductor and composer
- Gayane Khachaturian (1942–2009), Soviet and Armenian painter
- Karekin I Khachadourian (1880–1961), 81st Armenian Patriarch
- Karen Khachaturian (1920–2011), Soviet and Russian composer
- Leon Khachatourian (1937–2025), Iranian Armenian boxer
- Nina Katchadourian (born 1968), American artist
- Sarkis Katchadourian (1886–1947), Armenian artist
- Shabby Katchadourian (fl. 2010s), participant in Big Brother (British TV series) series 11
- Raffi Khatchadourian (fl. early 21st century), American journalist
- Vahagn Khachaturyan (born 1959), Armenian politician

== Fictional characters ==
- Ashley Katchadorian, a character from the animated web series The Most Popular Girls in School
- Kevin Khatchadourian, principal character in We Need to Talk About Kevin, a novel by Lionel Shriver
- Rafe Khatchadorian, protagonist of James Patterson's Middle School series

== See also ==
- 4802 Khatchaturian, minor planet
- Khachatryan
