= Ministry of Economy (Armenia) =

Government ministry of Armenia

The Ministry of Economy of Armenia
- Հայաստանի էկոնոմիկայի նախարարություն

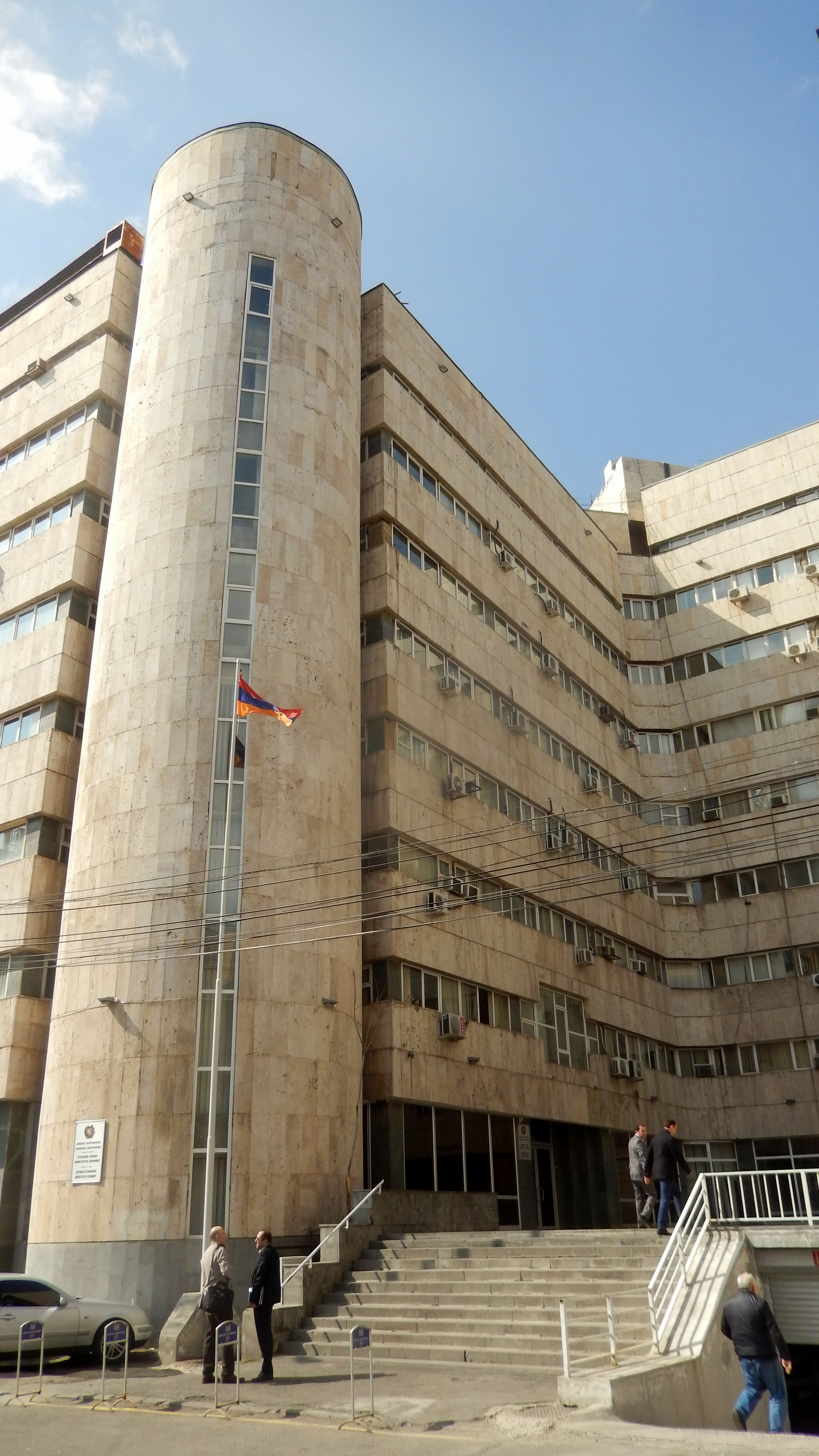

Ministry overview
- Formed: 1990
- Jurisdiction: Government of Armenia
- Headquarters: Yerevan, Armenia
- Minister responsible: Vahan Kerobyan
- Website: mineconomy.am

The Ministry of Economy of Armenia (Armenian: Հայաստանի էկոնոմիկայի նախարարություն, romanized: Ekonomikayi nakhararut’yun) is a ministry within the Government of Armenia.

== History ==
It was formed in 1990 after the reorganization of the State Planning Committee of the Soviet Socialist Republic of Armenia.

On 10 June 1997, in accordance with Armenian Presidential Decree No. 747 on "Changes in Structure of the Government of the Republic of Armenia” the Ministry of Trade, Services and Tourism, the Ministry of Industry, and the Ministry of Economy were merged into one ministry: the Ministry of Industry and Trade of the Republic of Armenia.

On 16 March 2002, in accordance with Presidential Decrees No. 1063 and 1064, the Ministry of Industry and Trade was reorganized into the Ministry of Trade and Economic Development.

On 21 April 2008, in accordance with a Presidential Decree, the Ministry of Trade and Economic Development was renamed the Ministry of Economy of the Republic of Armenia. On 29 September 2016 the ministry was again renamed, this time to the Ministry of Economic Development and Investments of the Republic of Armenia.

There are 22 structural and three separate departments in the organizational structure of the Ministry of Economy. Also, four state organizations and companies operate within the Ministry.

In March 2019 Ministry of Agriculture was merged into the Ministry of Economic Development and Investments, and the latter was renamed to Ministry of Economy.

== Ministers ==
Name	Took office	Left office	Office	Prime Minister (Cabinet)
Hrant Bagratyan	1991	1993	Minister of Economy	Vazgen Manukyan, Gagik Harutyunyan, Khosrov Harutyunyan
Armen Yeghiazaryan	1993	1995	Minister of Economy	Hrant Bagratyan
Andranik Andreasyan	1995	1996	Minister of Economy	Hrant Bagratyan
Vahram Avanesyan	1996	1997	Minister of Economy	Armen Sarkissian
Garnik Nanagulyan	1997	1998	Minister of Industry and Trade	Robert Kocharyan
Hayk Gevorgyan	1998	1999	Minister of Industry and Trade	Armen Darbinyan
Armen Darbinyan	1999	2000	Minister of Industry and Trade	Vazgen Sargsyan, Aram Sargsyan
Karen Chshmaritian	2000	2007	Minister of Industry and Trade then Minister of Trade and Economic Development	Andranik Margaryan
Nerses Yeritsyan	2007	2008	Minister of Trade and Economic Development	Serzh Sargysyan
Nerses Yeritsyan	2008	2010	Minister of Economy	Tigran Sargsyan
Tigran Davtyan	2010	2013	Minister of Economy	Tigran Sargsyan
Vahram Avanesyan	2013	2014	Minister of Economy	Tigran Sargsyan
Karen Chshmaritian	2014	2016	Minister of Economy	Hovik Abrahamyan
Artsvik Minasyan	24 February 2016	27 September 2016	Minister of Economy	Hovik Abrahamyan, Karen Karapetyan
Suren Karayan	27 September 2016	12 May 2018	Minister of Economy then Ministry of Economic Development and Investments	Karen Karapetyan, Serzh Sargsyan
Artsvik Minasyan	12 May 2018	3 October 2018	Minister of Economic Development and Investments	Nikol Pashinyan
Tigran Khachatryan	15 October 2018		Minister of Economic Development and Investments / Minister of Economy	Nikol Pashinyan
Vahan Kerobyan	26 November 2020		Minister of Economic Development and Investments / Minister of Economy	Nikol Pashinyan

== See also ==
- Economy of Armenia
