= Bidri (tribe) =

Arab tribe

Bıdri

Regions with significant populations
- Turkey: Kozluk, Sason, Mutki, Güroymak, Hasköy, parts of Muş.

Languages
- Arabic

Religion
- Islam

Related ethnic groups
- Arabs

Bidri (Turkish: Bıdri) is an Arab tribe mainly inhabiting Kozluk and Sason in Turkey.

== Language ==
The Arabic dialect spoken by the tribe is substantially different with it being heavily affected by Kurdish and also Turkish which results in it not being intelligible with those spoken in Şanlıurfa, Mardin, and Hatay in Turkey, as well as in the Arab world.

== History ==
Arabs in the region coexisted with Armenians, but with the exception of a few tribes, most of them eventually took part in the massacre of Armenians.

== Sub-tribes ==
Bidri is made up of several sub-tribes:

- Zekeri
- Musi
- Sarmi
- Jalali
- Khazali
- Bederi (Bidri)
- Shigo (Şigo/Şego)
