= Rafik Khachatryan =

Armenian artist (1937–1993)

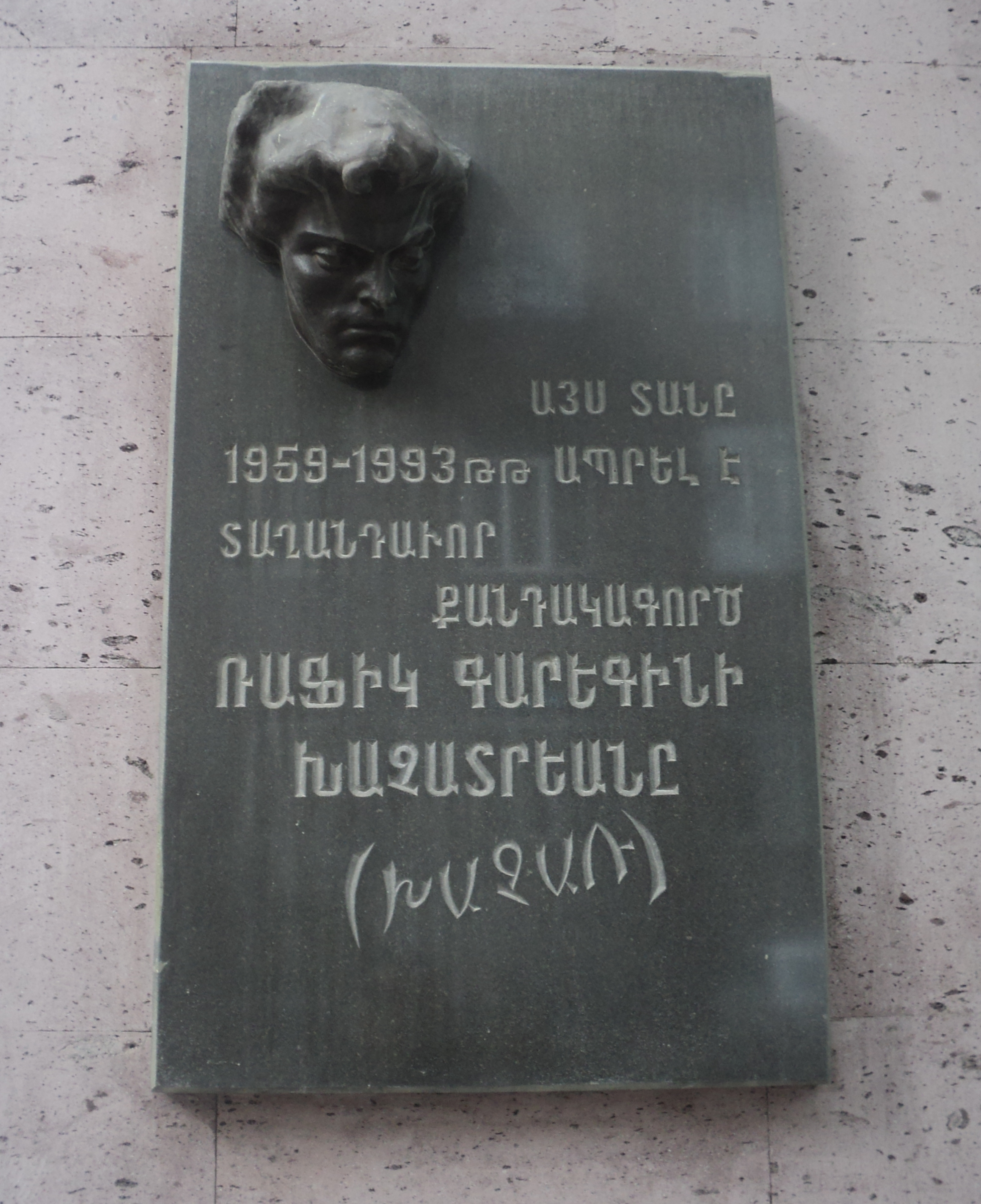
Memorial Plaque: Rafik Garegin Khachatryan (Khachar). Yerevan city, Armenia.

Rafik Khachatryan (Armenian: Ռաֆիկ Գարեգինի Խաչատրյան; October 7, 1937 – January 16, 1993) was an Armenian sculptor. He was the father of Garegin Khachatryan (1975–1995).

== Biography ==
Khachatryan was a direct descendant of the house of Daniel-Bek of Sassun (province Sassun or Sason of Western Armenia) (second half of the 18th century) and Khachatur-Bek of Mush (town Mush of Western Armenia) (first half of the 19th century), and the father of Garegin Khachatryan - one of the young heroes of the National Liberation war.

He graduated from the Phanos Therlemzyan Art college (Yerevan) in 1966 and the Yerevan Art-Theatrical Institute (University) in 1971.

== Activities ==
Khachatryan was a participant and an ideologist of the Armenian national liberation movement of the 20th century. He provided humanitarian assistance, materials, and other means for the self-defesnse troops and for the people of Nagorny Karabakh. He was a member of the Army of Independence along with Ashot Navasardyan, Andranik Margaryan, Hakobjan Tadevosyan, Movses Gorgisyan and other patriots of Armenia.

Khachatryan was a member of the Art Unions of Armenia and the USSR since 1976. He created sculptures and memorial complexes for the martyred freedom fighters.

== Works ==
Sculptures: "Alexander Spendiaryan" (1971, in Museum of Alexander Spendiaryan, Yerevan), "Spring" (1972), "The Soldier of the Victory" (1975), "Stepan Shahumyan" (1977, in State Art Gallery of Armenia or National Gallery of Armenia), "Maxim Gorky and Avetik Isahakyan" (1978, Museum of Armenian-Russian friendship, Abovyan town, Armenia), "Komitas" (1978, Yerevan city museum), "Sarkis Lukashin (Srapionyan)" (1980, National Gallery of Armenia), "The Armenian Lady" (1980), "Ode of the Peace" (1984), "Metalurgist-worker" (1985), "The Torch of the Revolution" (1987), "Paruyr Sevak", "Hovhannes Shiraz", Hovhannes Hayvazyan (Ivan Aivazovsky)", "Hovsep Shishmanyan (Tserents)" etc. Memorial complexes: "Mother Armenia" - dedicated to the memory of the heroes of the World War II (1975, Harthavan), dedicated to the memory of the heroes of the World War II (1982, Kathnaghpyur), "Djangulum" spring-fountain (1975, Yerevan). His works are exhibited in many foreign countries including Portugal, Bulgaria, Romania, Czechia, Slovakia, and Germany.

== Bibliography ==
- Encyclopedia of Karabakh Liberation War. 1988-1994 (in Armenian), Armenian Encyclopedia Publishing, Yerevan, 2004.

Ղարաբաղյան ազատագրական պատերազմ հանրագիտարան [Karabakh Liberation War encyclopedia] (in Armenian). p. 430 – via Wikisource.

- N.Voronov (ru:Воронов, Никита Васильевич), Sovetskaya monumentalnaya skulptura 1960-1980, Moscow, "Iskusstvo" Publishing House, 1984 (in Russian)
- Gohar Khostikyan, The Armenian Artists: biographical dictionary, Yerevan, 1993 (in Armenian) (unpublished).
- Albert Pharsadanyan, The Armenian: biographies of the prominent Armenians in one line, Yerevan, "VMV-print" Publishing House, 2004) (in Armenian)
- Whoe is Whoe, biographical encyclopedia, volume 2, page 724, Armenian Encyclopedia Publishing, Yerevan, 2007 (in Armenian).
- Khachar, biography and works - with photos, Samark Publishing House, 7 September 2007, Yerevan, (in Armenian).
- Rafo, Avangard, independent weekly, 3–9 October 2007, Yerevan, (in Armenian).
- The Master of the Stone Poetry (Qare Poeziayi Varpetn), "Hay Zinwor", the Official Weekly of the MOD, 6–13 October 2007, Yerevan, (in Armenian).
- Television Sujet about Khachar (Rafik Khachatryan), Yerevan Television Studio, 7 October 2007, Yerevan, (in Armenian).
- Television Sujet about Khachar (Rafik Khachatryan), ArmenAkob Television Studio, 14 October 2007, Yerevan, (in Armenian).
- Television Sujet about Khachar (Rafik Khachatryan), Zinuzh Television Studio, 21 October 2007, Yerevan, The 1st Channel of Armenia (Public Television 1st Channel) (in Armenian).
- Sasun Grigoryan, Musanera ch'lrecin, v.3, Yerevan, 2010, pages 67–68 (in Armenian).
