= Grigor Jaghetyan =

Armenian politician

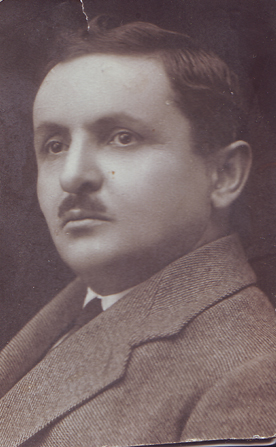

Minister of Finance of the First Republic of Armenia
- In office April 24, 1919 – August 5, 1919
- Prime Minister: Alexander Khatisian
- Preceded by: Artashes Enfiajyan
- Succeeded by: Sargis Araratyan

Personal details
- Born: 1885 Ijevan
- Died: 1938 (aged 52–53)

Grigor Jaghetyan (Armenian: Գրիգոր Ջաղեթյան 1885 in Ijevan - 1938) was an Armenian politician who served as Minister of Finance of the First Republic of Armenia in 1919.

He was chairman of the State Bank of Armenia from 1924 to 1930.
