= Düzkışla, Muş =

Düzkışla
- Municipality
- Location in Turkey
- Coordinates: 38°40′56″N 41°41′22″E
- Country: Turkey
- Province: Muş
- District: Hasköy
- Population (2021): 2,676
- Time zone: UTC+3 (TRT)
- Postal code: 49710

Düzkisla (Armenian: Մկրագոմ, romanized: Mkragom) is a town (belde) in the Hasköy District, Muş Province, Turkey. Its population is 2,676 (2021).
