= Artashes Enfiajyan =

Armenian politician

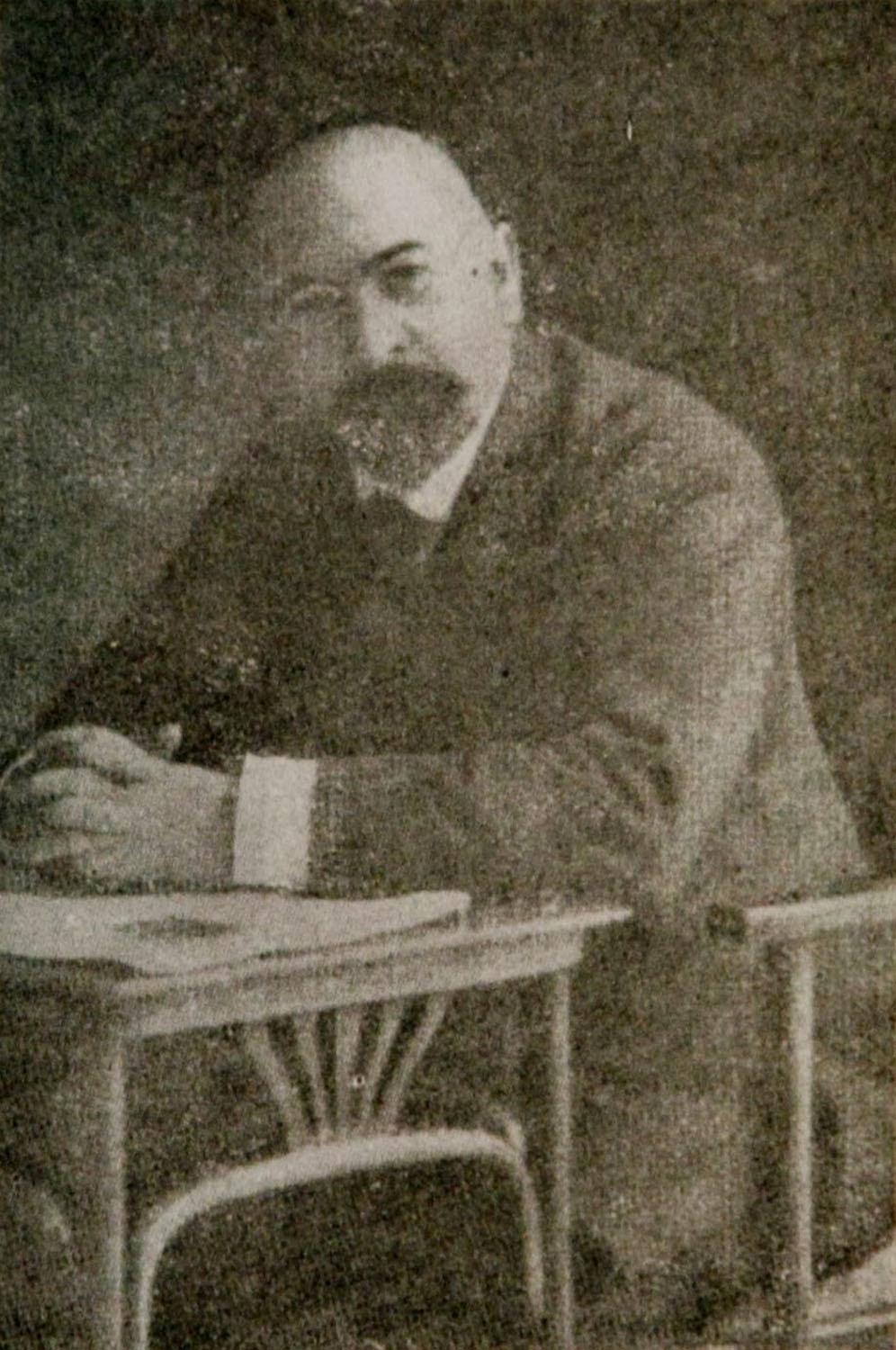

Minister of Finance of the First Republic of Armenia
- In office May 5, 1920 – November 24, 1920
- Prime Minister: Hamo Ohanjanyan
- Preceded by: Sargis Araratyan
- Succeeded by: Hambardzum Terteryan
- In office November 4, 1918 – April 27, 1919
- Prime Minister: Hovhannes Katchaznouni
- Preceded by: Khachatur Karchikyan
- Succeeded by: Grigor Jaghetyan

Artashes Enfiajyan (Armenian: Արտաշես Էնֆիաջյան) was an Armenian politician who served as Minister of Finance of the First Republic of Armenia from 1918 to 1919 and from 1919 to 1920.

In a letter to his wife, the first prime minister of Armenia, Hovhannes Kajaznuni, appreciated Enfiajyan, a tobacco factory owner, the most of the members of the Armenian Populist Party in the cabinet, adding however that he is "difficult to manage".
