= Hasköy, Muş =

Hasköy
- Municipality
- Location within Turkey
- Coordinates: 38°40′56″N 41°41′22″E
- Country: Turkey
- Province: Muş
- District: Hasköy

Government
  - Mayor: Cemal Orbay (MHP)
- Elevation: 1,250 m (4,100 ft)
- Population (2024): 26,336
- Time zone: UTC+3 (TRT)
- Postal code: 49700
- Area code: 0436
- Website: www.haskoy.bel.tr

Hasköy (Armenian: Խասգյուղ, romanized: Khaskyugh; Kurdish: Dêrxas; Arabic: هاسكوي) is a town in Muş Province of the Eastern Anatolia region of Turkey. It is the seat of Hasköy District. Hasköy was elected from the MHP in the 2024 Turkish Local Elections, with Cemal Orbay serving as the mayor. According to the 2024 population census, the district's total population is 26,336.

== Demographics ==
The main town and two of the nearby villages are populated by Arabs from the Bidri tribe, while Kurds reside in the other 16 villages. The Bidri tribe knows both Arabic and Kurdish. 4,000 Armenians lived in the area before the Armenian genocide in 1915.
