= Armen Darbinyan =

Armenian politician (born 1964)

- Արմեն Դարբինյան
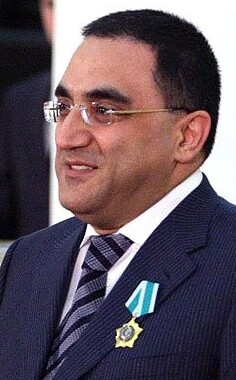
- Darbinyan in 2010

Minister of Industry and Trade of Armenia
- In office 1999–2000
- Preceded by: Hayk Gevorgyan
- Succeeded by: Karen Chshmaritian

7th Prime Minister of Armenia
- In office 10 April 1998 – 11 June 1999
- President: Robert Kocharyan
- Preceded by: Robert Kocharyan
- Succeeded by: Vazgen Sargsyan

Minister of Finance of Armenia
- In office 15 May 1997 – 10 April 1998
- Preceded by: Levon Barkhudaryan
- Succeeded by: Edward Sandoyan

First Vice-Chairman of the Central Bank of Armenia
- In office 1994–1997
- Preceded by: position established
- Succeeded by: Arthur Javadyan

Personal details
- Born: January 23, 1965 (age 61) Leninakan, Armenian SSR, Soviet Union (now Gyumri, Armenia)
- Party: none
- Education: Moscow State University

Armen Razmiki Darbinyan (Armenian: Արմեն Ռազմիկի Դարբինյան; born January 23, 1965) is an Armenian politician and university administrator who served as Prime Minister of Armenia from 1998 to 1999. In 1994, he was appointed First Vice-Chairman of the Central Bank of Armenia. In 1997, Darbinyan was appointed Armenian Minister of Finance. On April 10, 1998, he was appointed the Prime Minister of Armenia until June 11, 1999. Since 2001, Armen Darbinyan has been rector of Russian-Armenian State University. In April 2023, Darbinyan announced that he would not stand for reelection as rector of the university, citing a lack of support from the Russian and Armenian governments.

== Early life and education ==
Darbinyan was born on 23 January 1965 in Leninakan, which was part of the Armenian SSR at the time of his birth. In 1986, he received an honors degree at the Department of Economy at Moscow State University. In 1989, Darbinyan completed a post-graduate course at Moscow State University. Afterward, from 1989 to 1991, he was an assistant at the Department of Finance and Credit of the Faculty of Economics at his alma mater. He also worked in the representative office of Armenia in Moscow during this time as a specialist in the economic department. He eventually became Plenipotentiary Representative of the Republic of Armenia Interstate Commission for the Settlement of Issues of the external debt of the USSR following its collapse. Then, from 1992 to 1994, he was general director of the Armenian Foreign Trade Union "Armenintorg" before becoming First Deputy Chairman of the Central Bank of Armenia.

Political offices
Preceded by Robert Kocharyan	Prime Minister of Armenia; 1998-1999	Succeeded by Vazgen Sargsyan
