= Khachatur Bezirjyan =

Armenian politician

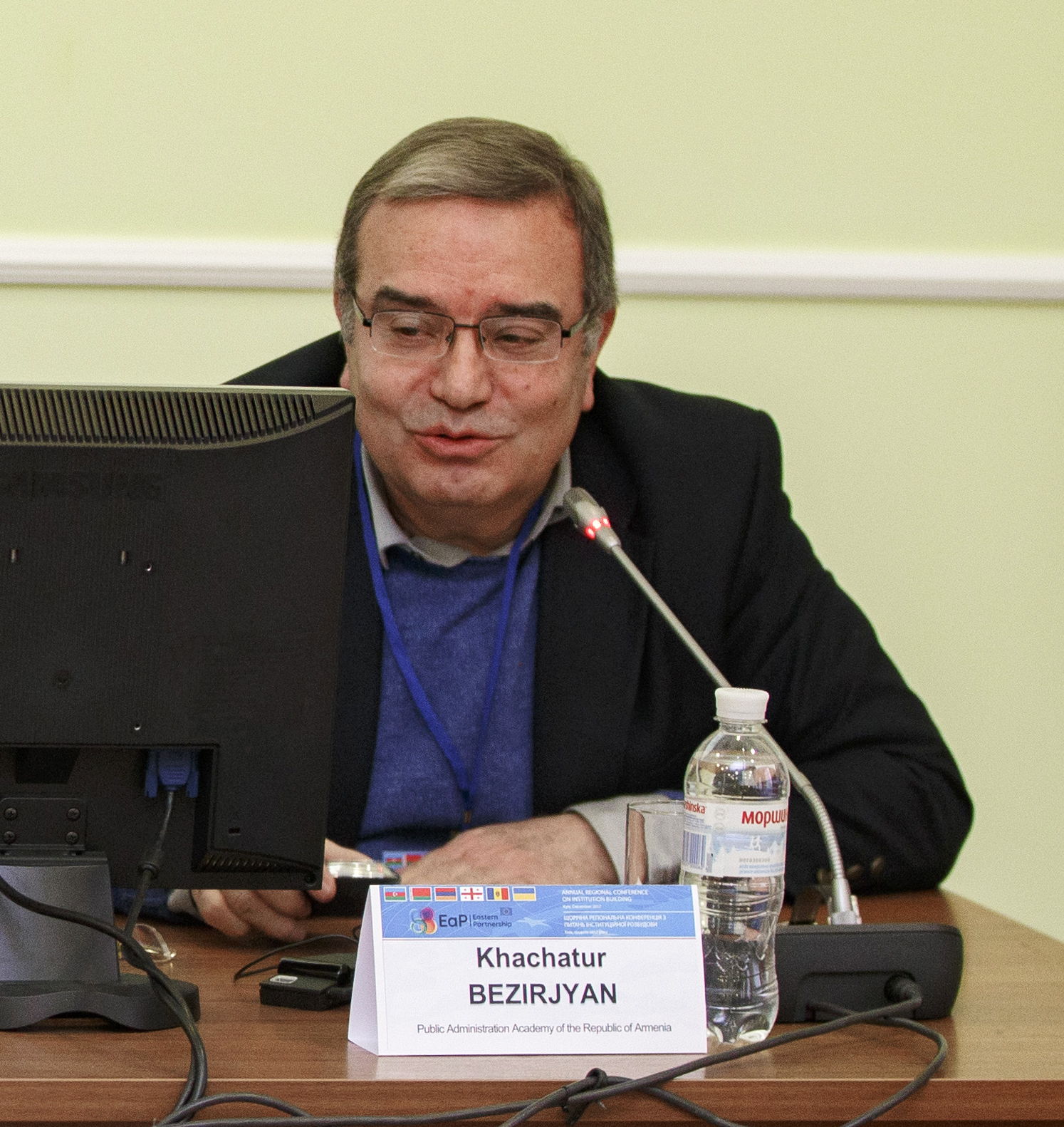

Vice-Rector for Supplementary and Continuing Education at Public Administration Academy of the RA

Personal details
- Born: 6 December 1950 (age 75) Yerevan, Armenian SSR, Soviet Union
- Education: Yerevan State University
- Profession: physicist

Khachatur Bezirjyan (Armenian: Խաչատուր Բեզիրջյան; born 1950) is an Armenian physicist, political figure, statesman, candidate of biological sciences. Bezirjyan has been serving as Vice-Rector for Supplementary and Continuing Education at Public Administration Academy of the Republic of Armenia since 2016.

== Biography and career ==
Bezirjyan was born in 1950 in Yerevan. He holds Graduate Diploma in Physics from Yerevan State University, as well as Post-Graduate Studies at the Institute of Experimental Biology of Armenian Academy of Sciences with Academic degree of Candidate of Sciences in Molecular Biology /PhD/.

Bezirjyan started his career as a laboratory senior assistant at the Institute of Experimental Biology of Armenian Academy of Sciences in 1977. From 1981-1987 he was a Junior Researcher at the Institute of Experimental Biology of Arm.SSR Academy of Sciences, 1987-1991 he supervised the Laboratory at the Research Technological Institute of Amino Acids, Scientific Production Association “Armbiotechnology” of the Ministry of Medical and Biological Industry of the USSR. During 1990 he served in Central Electoral Commission of Armenia as a Deputy Chairman. 1990-1995 Bezirjyan had been a Member of the Parliament of RA, 1992-1994 he was a Member of the Armenian Delegation of Minsk Group Negotiations in Organization for Security and Co-operation in Europe (OSCE).
