= Nerses Yeritsyan =

Armenian politician

Deputy president of the Central Bank of Armenia
- In office December 21, 2010 – present

Minister of Economy of Armenia
- In office April 21, 2008 – December 17, 2010
- President: Serzh Sargsyan
- Preceded by: himself
- Succeeded by: Tigran Davtyan

Trade and Economic Development minister of Armenia
- In office June 2007 – April 21, 2008
- Preceded by: karen Chshmaritian
- Succeeded by: himself

Personal details
- Born: February 23, 1971 (age 55) Yerevan, Armenia
- Education: Yerevan State Institute of National Economy

Nerses Yeritsyan (Armenian: Ներսես Հենրիկի Երիցյան; born February 23, 1971, in Yerevan) is deputy president of the Central Bank of Armenia and former Minister of Economy. Since Armenia's independence he has actively been involved in the design and implementation of economic policies in Armenia.

== Biography ==
In 1988–1993 he studied at Yerevan State Institute of National Economy (degree in macroeconomics), then completed post-graduate studies at the Macroeconomics Department and received a PhD diploma in 1995.

In 1993–1994 Yeritsyan worked as chief expert of National Assembly of Armenia, then worked at Central Bank of Armenia as assistant of President, head of monetary and lending policy department, Chief adviser of President and acting head of the financial monitoring center. He was a member of Central Bank Board.

In 2001–2003 he was adviser to the Executive Director from the Dutch group of the International Monetary Fund. In June, 2007, according to the Decree on the appointment of Members of the Cabinet by the President Serzh Sargsyan, Yeritsyan became RA Minister of Trade and Economic Development, reformed to Ministry of Economy in 2008.

Executive Board member of Armenian International Policy Research Group.

Speaks Armenian, Russian and English.

== Books ==
- 2003 Textbook on Modern Banking in Armenia, co-author
