= Ardashes Der-Khachadourian =

- Born: Armenian: Արտաշէս Տէր Խաչատուրեան; June 16, 1931; Beit Mery, Lebanon
- Died: December 5, 1993 (aged 62); Beit Mery, Lebanon
- Occupations: Armenian diasporan linguist, bibliographer, philologist, historian, periodicals and book collector, lexicographer, grammarist, and editor
- Writing career
- Period: 1931–1993

Ardashes Der-Khachadourian (Armenian: Արտաշէս Տէր Խաչատուրեան; 1931–1993) was an Armenian diasporan linguist, bibliographer, philologist, historian, periodicals and book collector, lexicographer, grammatist, and editor.

== Biography ==
Ardashes Der-Khachadourian born in Beit Mery, Lebanon on June 16, 1931.

Ardashes Der-Khachadourian was a teacher at numerous schools, mainly the Armenian Evangelical College, and a professor at the National Armenological Institute in Beirut, Lebanon.

He held Bachelor's and Master's degrees from the American University of Beirut in European History.

His Armenological works are generally dedicated to the birth and development of Armenian written media and periodicals, and his periodicals’ bibliographies are main sources of reference. He is also known for his work on an expansive Western Armenian dictionary called Hayotz Lezvi Nor Pararan (Armenian Language's New Dictionary - Armenian: Հայոց լեզուի նոր բառարան).

He died on December 5, 1993, in Beirut, Lebanon.

== Books in Armenian ==
- Տարօն (Հաւաքածոյ ժողովրդային երգերու), Պէյրութ, 1950։ (in Armenian)
- Հայ Մամուլի Ցուցահանդէս, Պէյրութ, ա տիպ 1961, բ տիպ 1964։ (in Armenian)
- Ուղղագրական ուղեցոյց, ա տիպ 1963, բ տիպ 1970, գ տիպ 1987։ (in Armenian)
- Հայ Տպագրութեան նախակարապետը' Մեղապարտ Յակոբ, Պէյրութ, 1966։ (in Armenian)
- Հայոց Լեզուի Նոր Բառարան, Պէյրութ, 1968։ (in Armenian)
- Շահան Ռ. Պէրպէրեան (1891 – 1956), կենսագրութիւն եւ մատենագիտութիւն, Պէյրութ, 1969։ (in Armenian)
- Մատենագիտութիւն Լեւոն Շանթի, Պէյրութ, 1969։ (in Armenian)
- Լիբանանահայ մամուլի յիսուն տարին (1921 – 1971), Պէյրութ, 1971։ (in Armenian)
- Սուրիահայ մամուլի պատմութիւն, Պէյրութ, 1972։ (in Armenian)
- Շահան Պէրպէրեան, Գեղագիտութիւն եւ Գեղարուեստ, Պէյրութ, 1975։ (in Armenian)
- Մատենագիտութիւն Ռուբէն Զարդարեանի, Պէյրութ, 1977։ (in Armenian)
- Հայ մշակութային գանձերու փրկութեան եւ պահպանման հրամայականը, Պէյրութ, 1980։ (in Armenian)
- Տարօնի խոհագիրքը, Պէյրութ, 1984։ (in Armenian)
- Հայ մամուլի ցուցակ, Լոս Անճելըս, 1987։ (in Armenian)
- Հ.Յ.Դաշնակցութեան 100–ամեայ մամուլը 1890 - 1990, Պէյրութ, 1990։ (in Armenian)
- Ս.Դ. Հնչակեան կուսակցութեան մամուլը (1887 – 1992), Պէյրութ, 1990։ (in Armenian)
- Արտաշէս Տէր Խաչատուրեան, Հայ Գիրքի Մատենագիտական Գործեր, խմբագրութիւն Կարօ Յովհաննէսեանի, Պէյրութ, 2014։ (in Armenian)
- Արտաշէս Տէր Խաչատուրեան, Հայ Մամուլի Մատենագիտական Գործեր, խմբագրութիւն Կարօ Յովհաննէսեանի, Պէյրութ, 2014։ (in Armenian)
