= Vlad =

Vlad is a Romanian male name. It is more commonly a nativized hypocorism of Vladislav and can also be used as a surname. Alternately, it may be a hypocoristic form of the Slavic name Vladimir (although the normative nickname is Vova). It may refer to:

== Given name ==
=== People ===
- Vlad I of Wallachia (fl. 1394–1397), voivode (prince) of Wallachia
- Vlad II Dracul (before 1395 – 1448), voivode of Wallachia
- Vlad the Impaler (1428/31 – 1476/77), voivode of Wallachia as Vlad III, inspiration for the character Count Dracula
- Vlad Călugărul (before 1425? – 1495), voivode of Wallachia as Vlad IV, half-brother of Vlad the Impaler
- Vlad cel Tânăr (1494–1512), voivode of Wallachia as Vlad V
- Vlad VI Înecatul (c. 1508 – 1532), voivode of Wallachia
- Vlad Vintilă de la Slatina (died 1535), voivode of Wallachia as Vlad VII
- Vlad Achim (born 1989), Romanian footballer
- Vlad Bădălicescu (born 1988), Romanian rugby union footballer
- Vlad Bujor (born 1989), Romanian footballer
- Vlad Chiricheș (born 1989), Romanian footballer
- Vlad Danale (born 1998), Romanian footballer
- Vlad Dragomir (born 1999), Romanian footballer
- Vlad Filat (born 1969), Moldovan businessman and politician, former Prime Minister of Moldova
- Vlad Goian (born 1970), Moldovan football manager and former player
- Vladimir Guerrero (born 1975), Dominican retired Major League Baseball player
- Vladimir Guerrero Jr. (born 1999), Canadian Major League Baseball player, son of the above
- Vlad Hagiu, (born 1963), Romanian water polo coach
- Vlad Ioviță (1935–1983), Moldovan writer
- Vlad Ivanov (born 1969), Romanian actor
- Vlado Kreslin (born 1953), Slovene singer, songwriter and musician
- Vlad Lyubovny (born 1973), commonly known as DJ Vlad, Ukrainian-born American interviewer, journalist and director
- Vlad Miriță (born 1981), Romanian singer
- Vlad Moldoveanu (born 1988), Romanian basketball player
- Vlad Morar (born 1993), Romanian footballer
- Vlad Munteanu (born 1981), Romanian retired footballer
- Vlad Muțiu (born 1995), Romanian football goalkeeper
- Vlad Nistor (rugby union) (born 1994), Romanian rugby union player
- Vlad Olteanu (born 1996), Romanian footballer
- Vlad Popescu (born 1989), Romanian politician
- Vlad Rusu (born 1990), Romanian footballer
- Vlad Sokolovskiy (born 1991), Russian singer
- Vlad Topalov (born 1985), Russian singer, dancer and actor
- Vlad Sabajuc (born 1998) Moldovan singer
- Vlad Pristavka (born 2006) Russian criminal, killed about 20 people in Kemerovo

=== Fictional characters ===
- Prince Vlad, in The Phantom, the leader of a group of tiny extraterrestrials called The Little People, which lives on the Isle of Eden
- Vlad Plasmius, in the Nickelodeon TV series Danny Phantom
- Vlad Taltos, in Steven Brust's Dragaera novels
- Vlad Vladikoff, in the Dr. Seuss children's books
- Vlad, in the Ender's Game series
- Vlad Glebov, in the Grand Theft Auto IV video game
- Vlad, in the Hack/Slash comic series
- Vlad Dracula, in the CBBC show Young Dracula

== Stage name ==
- Vlad (musician), born Volodymyr DeBriansky in 1972, Ukrainian-born American guitarist, composer, songwriter and music producer
- Vlad Stashevsky, Russian pop singer Vladislav Stanislavovich Tverdohlebov (born 1974)

== Surname ==
- Alexandru Vlad (born 1989), Romanian footballer
- Andrei Vlad (born 1999), Romanian football goalkeeper
- Dan Vlad (born 1983), Romanian rugby union player
- Marcel Vlad (born 1948), Romanian wrestler
- Marina Marta Vlad (born 1949), Romanian composer
- Nicu Vlad (born 1963), Romanian weightlifter
- Roman Vlad (1919–2013), Italian composer, pianist and musicologist

== See also ==
- Vladik
