= Vardan Khachatryan (politician) =

Armenian politician (1959–2026)

Vardan Khachatryan (Armenian: Վարդան Խաչատրյան; 6 April 1959 – 5 February 2026) was an Armenian politician.

== Life and career ==
Khachatryan was born in Jermuk on 6 April 1959. He was the Minister of finance from 2000 to 2008.

On 31 May 2008, he was appointed counselor to the President.

== Death ==
Khachatryan died on 5 February 2026, at the age of 66.
