= Shahen Khachatrian =

Armenian art expert (1934–2021)

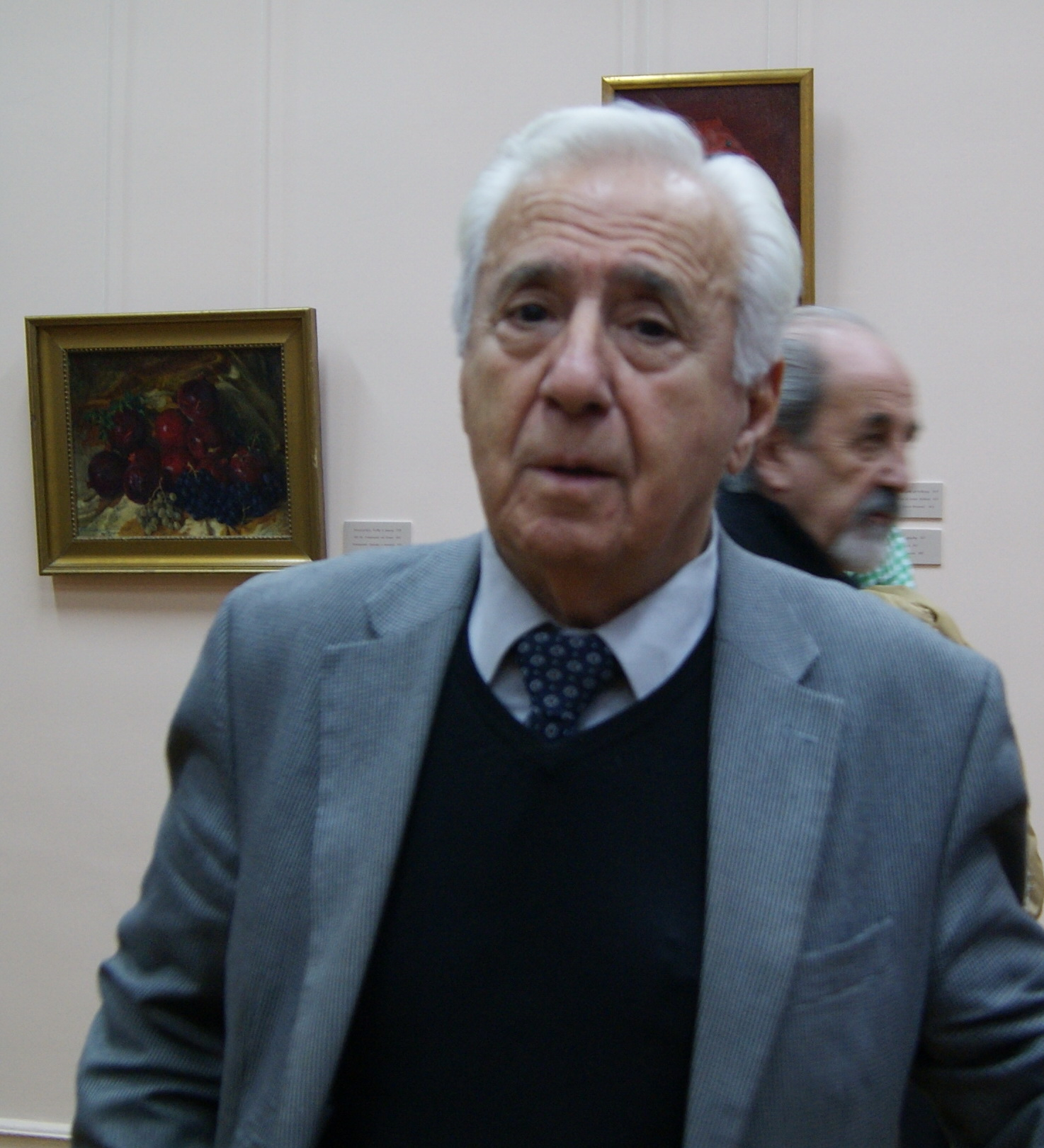

Shahen Gevorki Khachatryan (September 28, 1934 – October 27, 2021) was an Armenian art expert. He was the founding director of the Arshile Gorky Museum in Etchmiadzin.

== Biography ==
Khachatryan was born in Aleppo on September 28, 1934. In 1946, his family moved to Soviet Armenia. Khachatrian finished the Repin Institute of Arts. In 1967 Martiros Sarian appointed Khachatrian as the head of his museum. He directed the Martiros Sarian Museum for over 40 years. In 1991, Shahen Khachatrian also was appointed the head of National Gallery of Armenia. He enriched the gallery's collection with about 500 pieces purchased and collected from different countries and Armenian Diaspora. He led the gallery for 13 years.

Khachatrian published books dedicated to Sarian, Hakobian, Minas and Ayvazovski. He organized 60 exhibitions.

Khachatryan died on October 27, 2021, at the age of 87.

== Awards ==
- "Honored Artist of Armenia" (1984)
- "Movses Khorenatsi" medal (1998)
