= Russian-Armenian University =

University in Yerevan

- Российско-армянский университет Հայ-Ռուսական համալսարան
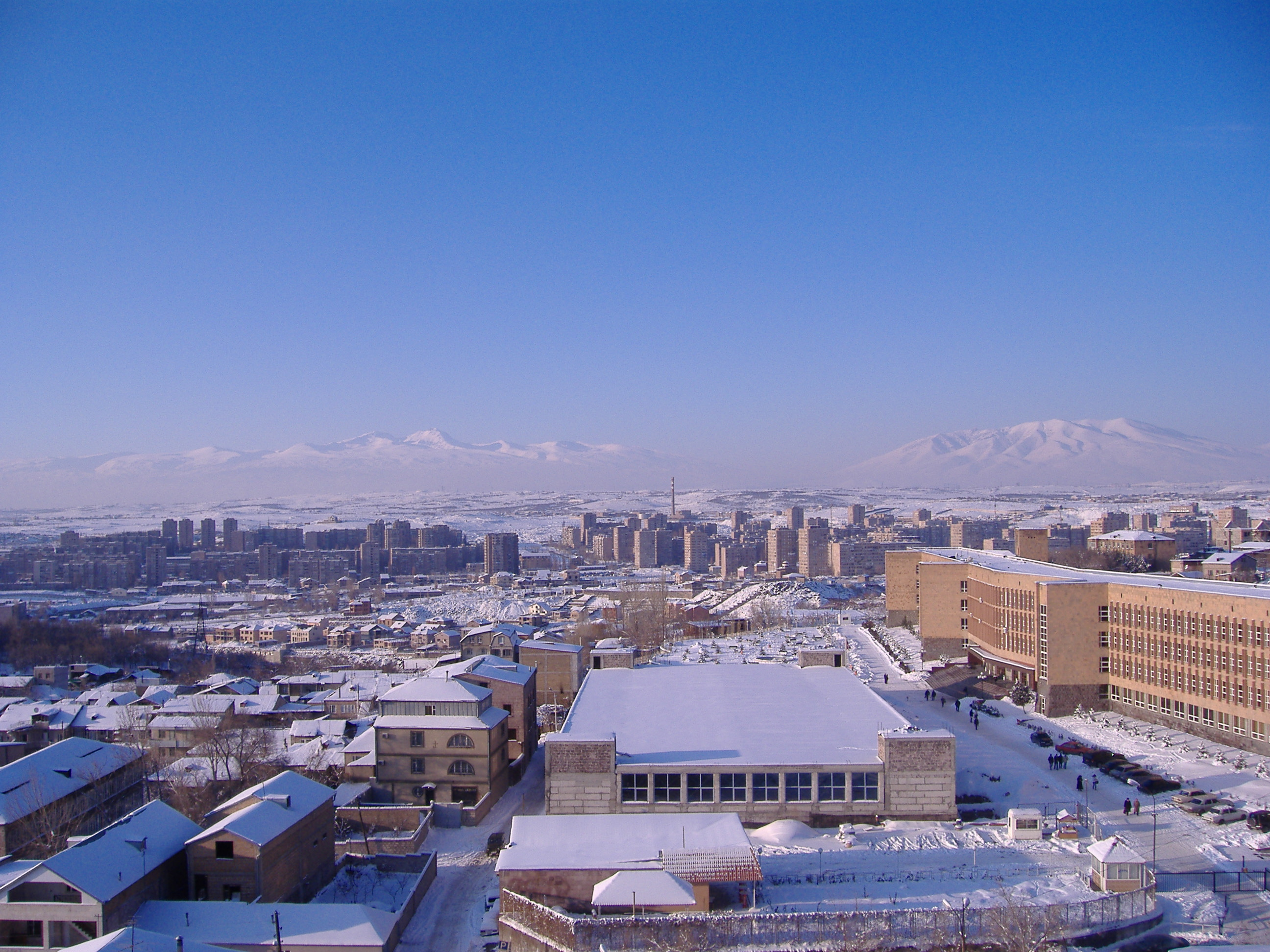
- Campus of the Russian-Armenian University (lower right)
- Type: Public
- Established: 1997; 29 years ago
- Rector: Edvard Sandoyan
- Administrative staff: 700
- Students: ~3800
- Location: Yerevan, Armenia; 40°12′37.84″N 44°30′11.84″E
- Website: http://www.rau.am/
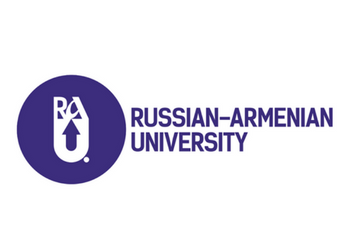

University rankings

Regional – Overall
- QS Emerging Europe and Central Asia: 128 (2022)

Russian-Armenian University (RAU; Russian: Российско-армянский университет, romanized: Rossiysko-armyanskiy universitet, РАУ; Armenian: Հայ-Ռուսական համալսարան, romanized: Hay-Rrusakan hamalsaran) is an intergovernmental university being under the joint authority of the Russian Federation and Armenia. The languages of instruction and communication at the university are Russian and Armenian.

There are Russian and Armenian education sectors operating at RAU. Upon graduation, students receive two state Diplomas: Armenian and Russian.

== History ==
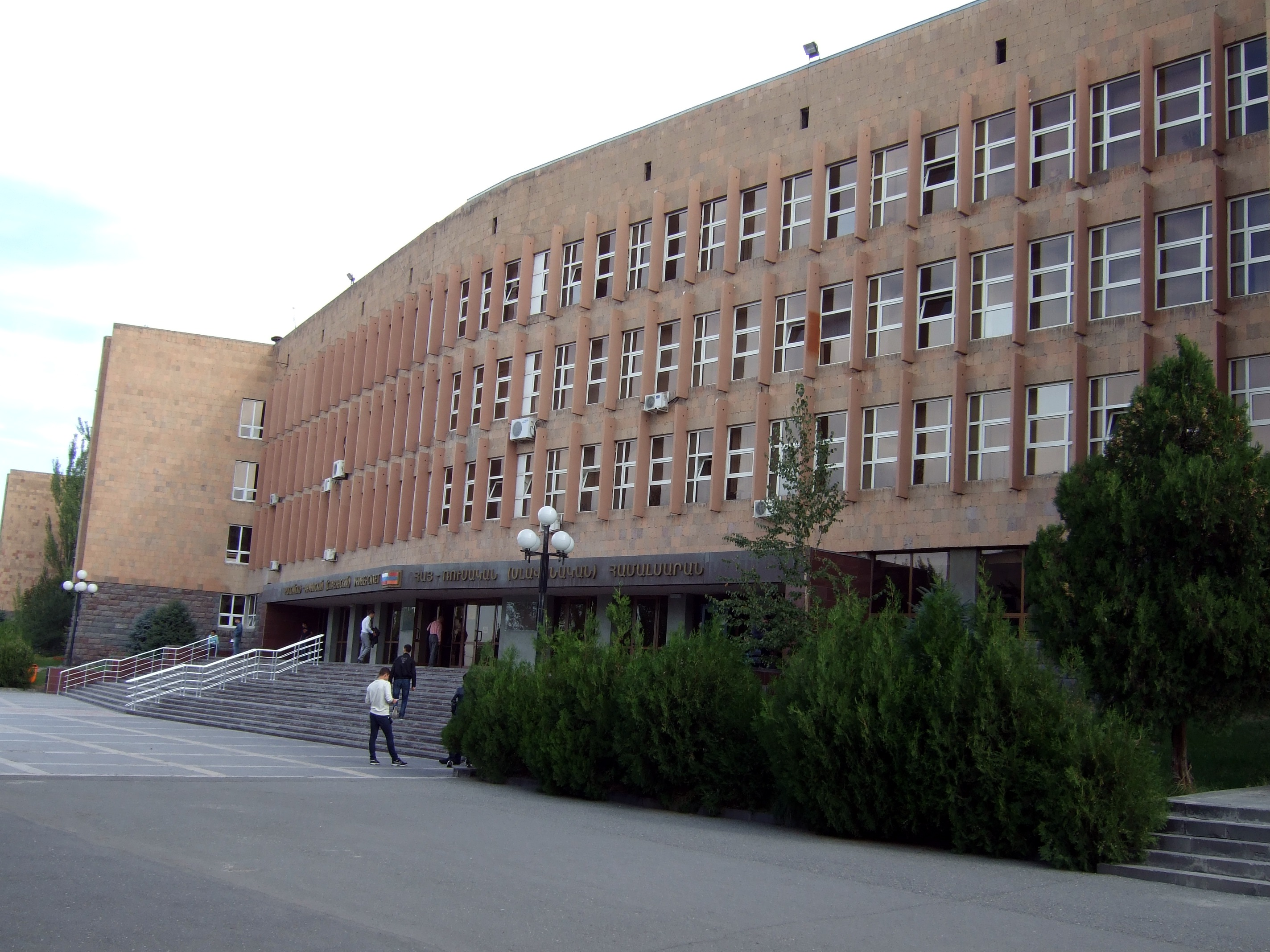
The main building

Russian-Armenian University was established following the inter-state agreement between Armenia and Russian Federation in 1997. In 1999, Academician Levon Mkrtchyan, Doctor of Philology, became university's first Rector. The current rector is Armen Darbinyan. The first students were enrolled in February 1999 in Law, Public and Municipal Administration and Journalism. Since then, the university has been constantly growing and encompassing new areas of education and research. Starting from 2002, scientific centers, institutions and problem research groups have been developing within the university. In the same year RAU opened a post-graduate course.

In 2004, the reconstruction of the main building was finished, while in 2009 RAU opened its own Sports Complex. On October 15, 2004, the Park of Gratitude was opened on the university premises as a symbol of the Russian-Armenian friendship. This very day has become the day of RAU. On April 29, 2005, RAU was accredited by the Ministry of Education and Science of the Russian Federation.

== Institutes and Departments ==
=== Institute of Law and Politics ===
- Department of Constitutional Law and Municipal Law
- Department of Political Science
- Department of International Law and European Law
- Department of Theory and History of Law and State
- Department of Criminal Law and Criminal Procedure Law
- Department of Civil Law and Civil Procedure Law
- Department of World Politics and International Relations

=== Institute of Mathematics and High Technology ===
- Department of Mathematics and Mathematical Modeling
- Department of System Programming
- Department of Mathematical Cybernetics
- Department of Quantum and Optical Electronics
- Department of General Physics and Quantum Nano-Structures
- Department of Materials Technology and Structure of Electronic Technique
- Department of Telecommunications
- Department of Bioengineering, Bioinformatics and Molecular Biology
- Department of General and Pharmaceutical Chemistry
- Department of Medical Biochemistry and Biotechnology
- Department of Microelectronic Schemes and Systems (jointly with "Synopsis Armenia" company)

=== Institute of Economics and Business ===
- Department of Economic Theory and Challenges of Transition Economies
- Department of Economics and Finance
- Department of Management, Business and Tourism

=== Institute of Humanities ===
- Department of Armenian Language and Literature
- Department of Theory of Language and Cross-cultural Communication
- Department of Psychology
- Department of World History and Area Studies
- Department of Philosophy
- Department of Russian Language and Professional Communication
- Department of World Literature and Culture

=== Institute of Media, Advertising and Film Production ===
- Department of Journalism
- Department of Creative Industries

=== University-wide Departments ===
- Department of Physical Education and Health
