= Vladik Khachatryan =

- Occupation: legislator

Vladik Khachatryan is the Minister of Science and Education in the Nagorno-Karabakh legislature.
