= Sason =

Municipality in Batman Province, Turkey

- Municipality
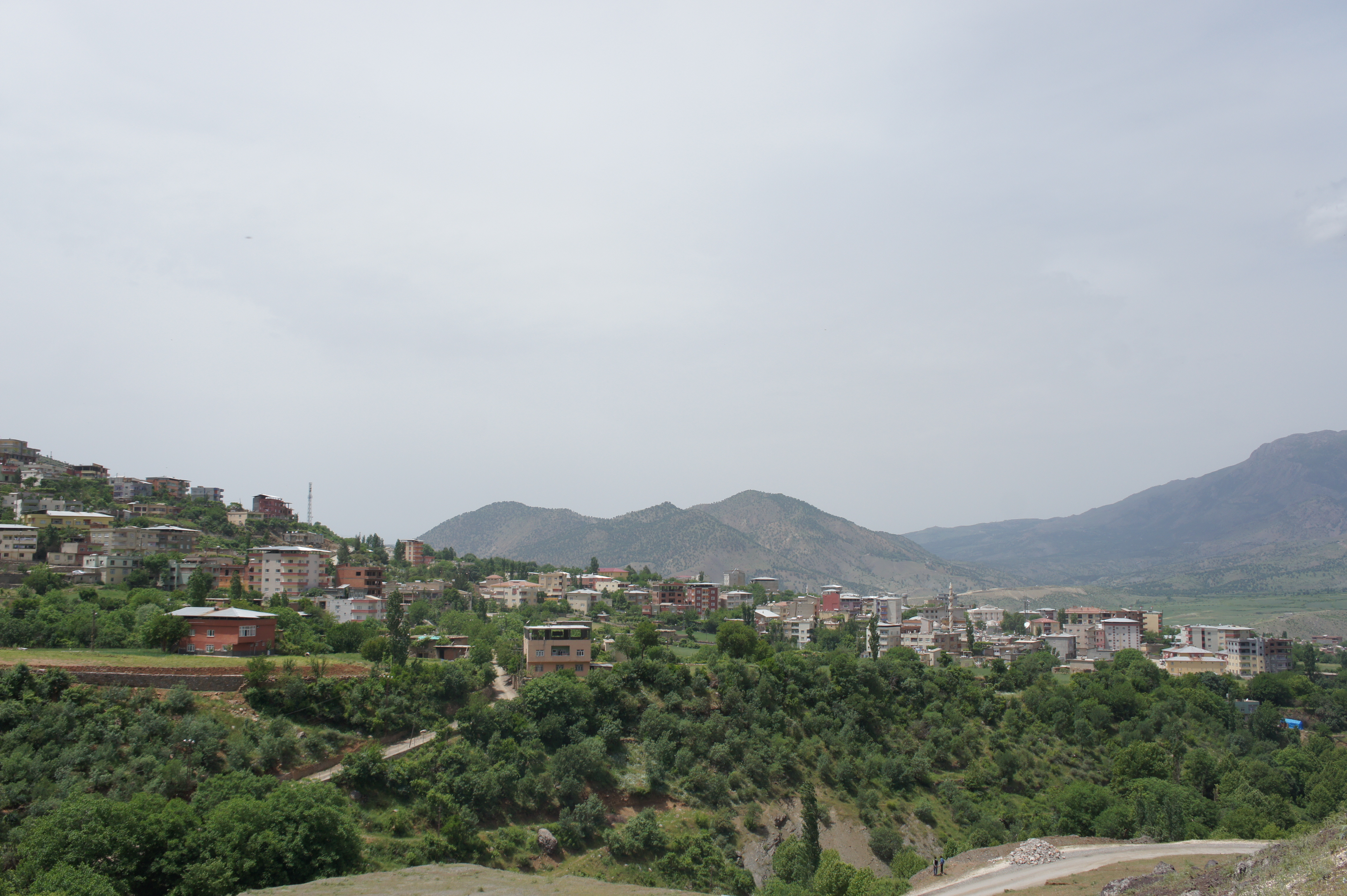

- Location within Turkey
- Coordinates: 38°22′49″N 41°23′43″E
- Country: Turkey
- Province: Batman
- District: Sason

Government
  - Mayor: Mehmet Şafi Yavuz (AKP)
- Population (2021): 12,696
- Time zone: UTC+3 (TRT)
- Postal code: 72500
- Website: www.sason.bel.tr

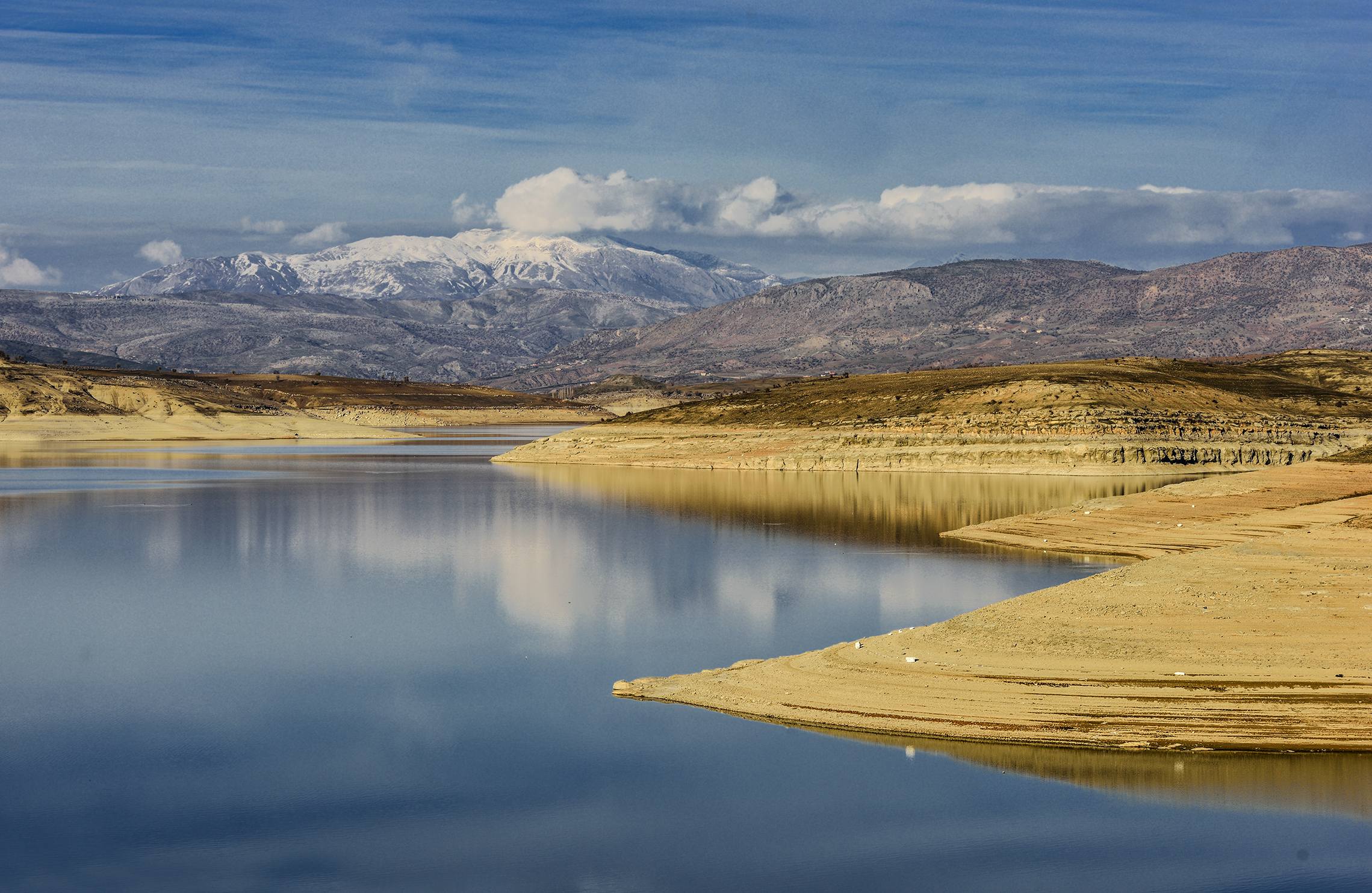
Sason region

Sason (Note: Armenian: Խաբլջոզ, romanized: Khabljoz, also Գաբլճոզ Gablchoz or Սասուն Sasun, etc.; Kurdish: Qabilcewz) is a town in the Batman Province of Turkey. It is the seat of the Sason District. Its population is 12,696 (2021). It was formerly known as Kabilcevz.

== Toponymy ==
Sason derives from the name of the historical region Sasun. In the Armenian tradition, the name of Sasun (from earlier Sanasunk) is traditionally associated with Sanasar (i.e., biblical Sharezer), the son of the Assyrian king Sennacherib who fled to Armenia after murdering his father․ Sanasar is said to have settled in the area around Mount Sim, which was called Sanasunk (as if meaning "Sanasar's progeny") after him and his descendants who populated the region.

The former name of the settlement, Kabilcevz, comes from the Arabic word jawz 'walnut' (Turkish ceviz), in reference to the abundance of walnut trees in the area.

== History ==
The now small town of Sason used to be a thriving city under the Baghratuni (Բաղրատունի) Kingdom of Armenia where it was created in the 10th century A.D. During the Ottoman period, Sason, then known as Kabilcevz, was located in the nahiye of Hazzo-Kabilcevz in the kaza (district) of Sasun within the Bitlis vilayet. Sometimes, it fell under the kaza of Kulp instead. Until 1915, it was a mixed Armenian-Kurdish village, reportedly with 105 Kurdish households and 45 Armenian households. It was the location of some of the most significant Armenian uprisings in 1884 and 1905. Most of the village's Armenians were deported and died during the Armenian genocide. The settlement became the center of the Sason District in 1925.

== Demographics ==
As of 2021, the population of the town was 12,696 (2021).

The town is inhabited by Arabs of the Bidri tribe and Kurds

== Government ==
In the local elections of March 2019, Muzaffer Arslan was elected Mayor. He was replaced by Mehmet Şafi Yavuz in February 2021.

== Culture ==
There are numerous ruins in the area, and also some historical water fountains, such as Sevek Çeşmesi, Nabuhan Çeşmesi, Hapyenk Çeşmesi, and Ağde Çeşmesi. There is also a türbe—a burial site of a holy man—called Şehan, which is the site of celebrations every July. The town had an Armenian church called Surp Stepanos.
