= Gagik Khachatryan (politician) =

Armenian politician (born 1955)

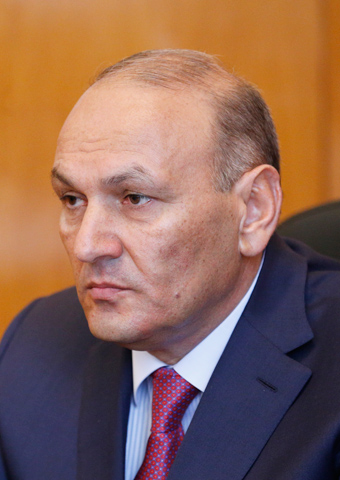
Khachatryan in 2014

Gagik Gurgeni Khachatryan (Armenian: Գագիկ Գուրգենի Խաչատրյան; born November 26, 1955) is an Armenian politician who held various positions in Armenia's state bureaucracy, notably serving as chairman of the State Revenue Committee from 2008 to 2014 and minister of finance from 2014 to 2016. He was popularly known as the "super minister" due to his numerous responsibilities. He is currently the defendant in a corruption-related criminal case in Armenia.

== Early life and education ==
Gagik Khachatryan was born in the village of Amasia in the Armenian SSR in 1955. He graduated from Yerevan Polytechnic University in 1977, majoring in industrial electronics. In 1987, he graduated from the Yerevan Institute of National Economy, receiving a degree in accounting and analysis of economic activity.

== Professional experience ==
- 1977–1978 worked as an electronics engineer in “Electron” factory
- 1978–1984 served as the second secretary of the initial organization of the Lenin Communist Youth Union Nairi regional committee
- 1984–1986 worked as the head of the department of the State Agro-technical school after G. Aghajanyan
- 1986–1989 served as the secretary of the initial party organization of Nor-Geghi State Technical College
- 1989–1996 – First Deputy Director of "Nairi" agro-firm
- 1996 worked as the Deputy Head of Hrazdan Tax Inspectorate
- 1996–1999 – Head of Mashtots Region Tax Inspectorate
- 1999–2000 – Head of the Tax Inspectorate of Erebuni region
- 2000 – Head of the Tax Inspectorate of Shahumyan region
- 2000–2001 – Deputy Head of the Tax Department of the RA Ministry of State Revenues
- 2001–2008 – Deputy Chairman of the RA State Customs Committee
- April 15 – June 4, 2008 – Acting Chairman of the RA State Customs Committee
- On June 4, 2008, by the decision of the Prime Minister of Armenia, he was relieved of the post of Deputy Chairman of the State Customs Committee under the Government of Armenia
- On June 4, 2008, by the decree of the President of Armenia he was appointed the Chairman of the State Customs Committee of Armenia
- On August 20, 2008, by the decree of the President of Armenia he was appointed the Chairman of the State Revenue Committee of Armenia
- On April 26, 2014, he was relieved of the post of Chairman of the State Revenue Committee under the Government of Armenia by the decree of the President of Armenia
- On April 26, 2014, by the Decree of the President of Armenia he was appointed Minister of Finance of Armenia.

== Personal life ==
Gagik Khachatryan is married and has two sons and one daughter. His sons, Gurgen and Artyom Khachatryan, are entrepreneurs and the co-founders of Galaxy Group of Companies. As evidenced by the interview given to banks.am, Khachatryan’s two sons have never had involvement in politics or state work, and have strictly engaged in business. In 2019, they announced the “Innovation and Technology Park” project in Yerevan, with an estimated number of 6,000 jobs.

== Legal issues ==
Khachatryan is currently the accused in major corruption-related case in Armenia. The accusing side claims that he caused $41 million worth of damages to the Armenian state. His two sons (who are currently wanted in Armenia) and two of his nephews are also accused in corruption-related cases.

In May 2022, the US government announced that it planned to seize a mansion in Los Angeles belonging to Khachatryan, contending that it was bought using bribe money. A trust representing Khachatryan and his sons bought the mansion for $14.4 million in 2011. In July 2024, the US Justice Department announced that it had reached a settlement to recover the property. Under the terms of the settlement, the mansion will be forfeited to the US government, which will then sell the property and retain 85% of the net proceeds of the sale. The remaining proceeds will be delivered to Khachatryan's sons and a corporation they own. Some or all of the forfeited proceeds will be transferred to Armenia.

== Titles and awards ==
On December 29, 2011, Gagik Khachatryan was awarded the special rank of Lieutenant General of the Customs Service by the decree of the president of Armenia. He received the Medal of Anania Shirakatsi in 2012.
