= First Lady of Armenia =

Spouse of the President of Armenia

- Flag of Armenia
- Incumbent; Anahit Minasyan since March 13, 2022
- Residence: Residence of the President of Armenia
- Term length: Depends on the president
- Inaugural holder: Lyudmila Ter-Petrosyan
- Formation: November 11, 1991

First Lady of Armenia (Armenian: Հայաստանի առաջին տիկին, romanized: Hayastani arrajin tikin) refers to the wife of the president of Armenia. The current first lady of Armenia is Anahit Minasyan, who has held the position since March 13, 2022. To date, there have been no first gentlemen of Armenia.

This position is not to be confused with the spouse of the prime minister of Armenia, who is sometimes referred to as the "First Lady of Armenia".

== First ladies of Armenia (since 1991) ==
First Lady	Portrait	Term begins	Term ends	President of Armenia
Lyudmila Ter-Petrosyan		November 11, 1991	February 3, 1998	Levon Ter-Petrosyan
Bella Kocharyan		February 3, 1998	April 9, 2008	Robert Kocharyan
Rita Sargsyan		April 9, 2008	April 9, 2018	Serzh Sargsyan
Nouneh Sarkissian		April 9, 2018	February 1, 2022	Armen Sarkissian
Mariam Margaryan (Acting)		February 1, 2022	March 13, 2022	Alen Simonyan (Acting)
Anahit Minasyan		March 13, 2022	Incumbent	Vahagn Khachaturyan

== See also ==
- Spouse of the prime minister of Armenia
