= Spouse of the prime minister of Armenia =

Spouse of the Prime Minister of Armenia
- Հայաստանի վարչապետի ամուսին
- Flag of Armenia
- Incumbent; Vacant since 27 February 2026
- Residence: Residence of the Prime Minister of Armenia
- Term length: Depends on the prime minister
- Inaugural holder: Varduhi Ishkhanyan
- Formation: 25 September 1991

The spouse of the prime minister of Armenia (Armenian: Հայաստանի վարչապետի ամուսին, romanized: Hayastani varch’apeti amusin) is the person who the prime minister of Armenia is married with.

While sometimes called the "First Lady of Armenia", this position is not to be confused with the First Lady of Armenia, who is the wife of the president of Armenia.

== Spouses of the prime minister of Armenia (since 1991) ==
| Spouse of the Prime Minister | Portrait | Term begins | Term ends | Prime Minister of Armenia |
|---|---|---|---|---|
| Varduhi Ishkhanyan | | 25 September 1991 | 22 November 1991 | Vazgen Manukyan |
| Anahit Khachatryan | | 22 November 1991 | 30 July 1992 | Gagik Harutyunyan |
| Brliantina Harutyunyan | | 30 July 1992 | 2 February 1993 | Khosrov Harutyunyan |
| | | 2 February 1993 | 4 November 1996 | Hrant Bagratyan |
| Nouneh Sarkissian | | 4 November 1996 | 20 March 1997 | Armen Sarkissian |
| Bella Kocharyan | | 20 March 1997 | 10 April 1998 | Robert Kocharyan |
| | | 10 April 1998 | 11 June 1999 | Armen Darbinyan |
| Vacant | | 11 June 1999 | 27 October 1999 | Vazgen Sargsyan |
| Vacant | | 27 October 1999 | 3 November 1999 | Vacant |
| | | 3 November 1999 | 2 May 2000 | Aram Sargsyan |
| Susanna Margaryan | | 2 May 2000 | 25 March 2007 | Andranik Margaryan |
| Rita Sargsyan | | 25 March 2007 (Acting) | 4 April 2007 (Acting) | Serzh Sargsyan |
| Rita Sargsyan | | 4 April 2007 | 7 April 2008 | Serzh Sargsyan |
| Vacant | | 7 April 2008 | 9 April 2008 | Vacant |
| Gohar Sargsyan | | 9 April 2008 | 13 April 2014 | Tigran Sargsyan |
| Julieta Abrahamyan | | 13 April 2014 | 8 September 2016 | Hovik Abrahamyan |
| Vacant | | 8 September 2016 | 13 September 2016 | Vacant |
| Lilit Karapetyan | | 13 September 2016 | 17 April 2018 | Karen Karapetyan |
| Rita Sargsyan | | 17 April 2018 | 23 April 2018 | Serzh Sargsyan |
| Lilit Karapetyan (Acting) | | 23 April 2018 | 8 May 2018 | Karen Karapetyan (Acting) |
| Anna Hakobyan | | 8 May 2018 | 27 February 2026 | Nikol Pashinyan |
| Vacant | | 27 February 2026 | Incumbent | Nikol Pashinyan |

== See also ==
- First Lady of Armenia
