= Anna Hakobyan =

Armenian journalist and Second Lady of Armenia

- Աննա Հակոբյան
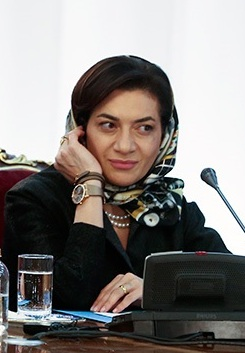
- Hakobyan in 2023

Spouse of the Prime Minister of Armenia
- In role 8 May 2018 – 27 February 2026
- Prime Minister: Nikol Pashinyan
- Preceded by: Lilit Karapetyan (Acting)
- Succeeded by: Vacant

Personal details
- Born: 1 February 1978 (age 48) Yerevan, Armenian SSR, Soviet Union (now Armenia)
- Domestic partner: Nikol Pashinyan (sep. 2026)
- Children: 4
- Education: Yerevan State University
- Profession: Journalist
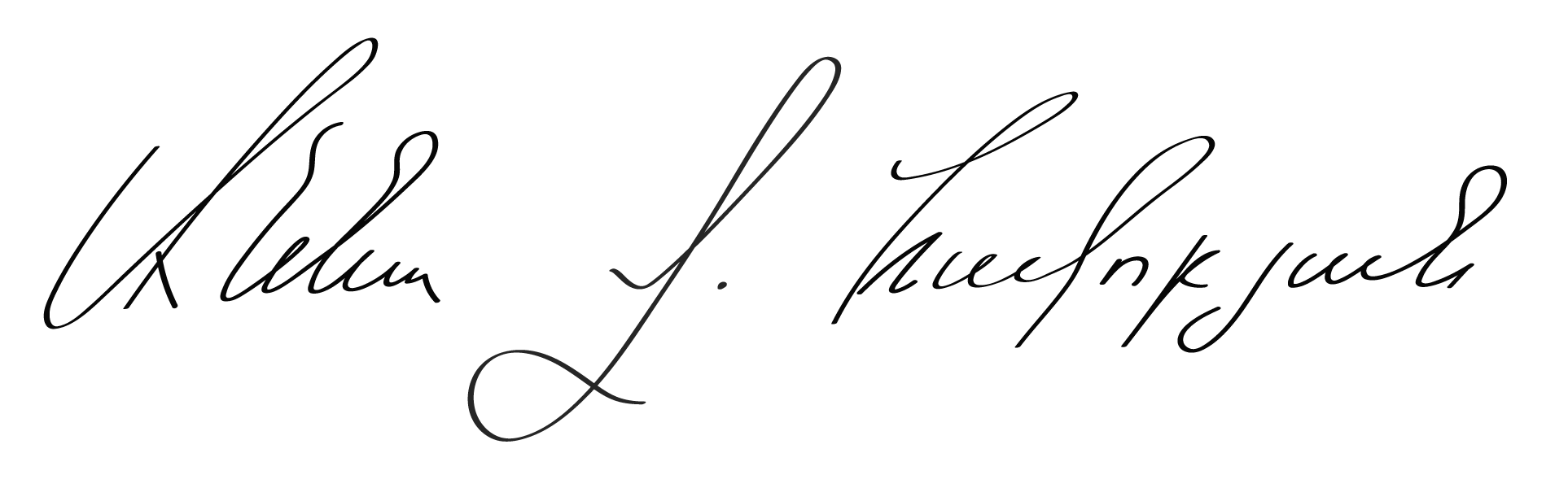
- Signature
- Website: Official website

Anna Vachiki Hakobyan (Armenian: Աննա Վաչիկի Հակոբյան; born 1 February 1978) is an Armenian journalist and the editor-in-chief of the Haykakan Zhamanak (Armenian Times) newspaper. From 2018 until their separation in 2026, she was the partner of the Prime Minister of Armenia, Nikol Pashinyan. Unofficially, Hakobyan was regarded as the "First Lady of Armenia", a position that is reserved for the spouses of the President of Armenia.

== Education and career ==
Anna Hakobyan was born on 1 February 1978, in the Armenian SSR. She graduated from Yerevan Secondary School No. 119 in 1995. She graduated from the Yerevan State University. Hakobyan graduated from the Faculty of Philology, Department of Journalism at Yerevan State University in 1999, earning a Bachelor’s degree in Journalism. After she graduated, she began working as a journalist in Armenia. She is currently the editor-in-chief of the largest newspaper in Armenia, Haykakan Zhamanak. In 2025, she enrolled at Beijing Normal University, where she is pursuing a Master’s degree in Chinese Philosophy.

=== 2018 Velvet Revolution ===
Hakobyan played an active role in the 2018 Armenian Revolution, which were a series of anti-government peaceful mass protests in response to the past president's third consecutive term. On 8 May 2018, Nikol Pashinyan was elected Prime Minister.

== Partner of the Prime Minister ==
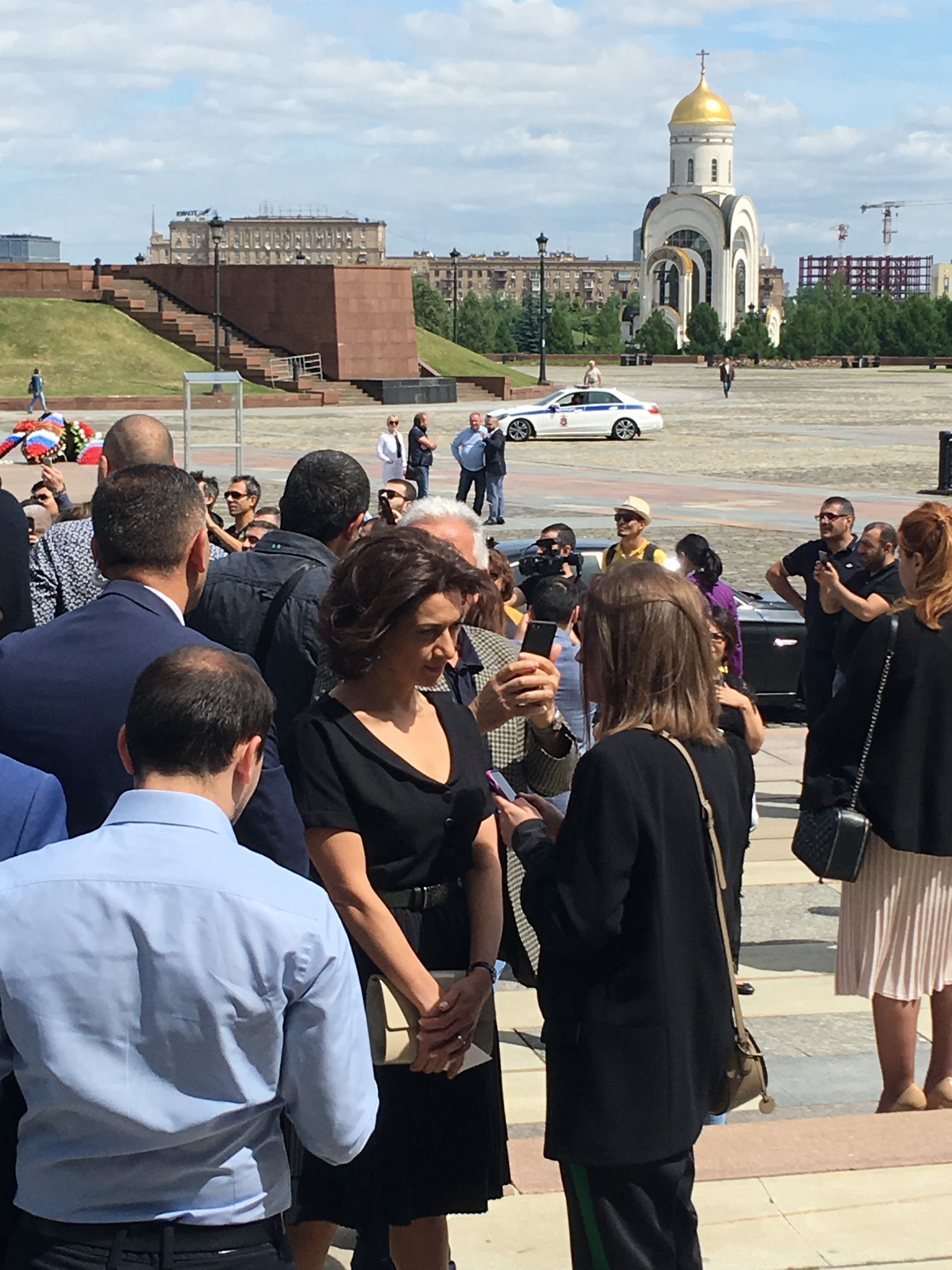
Hakobyan in Moscow

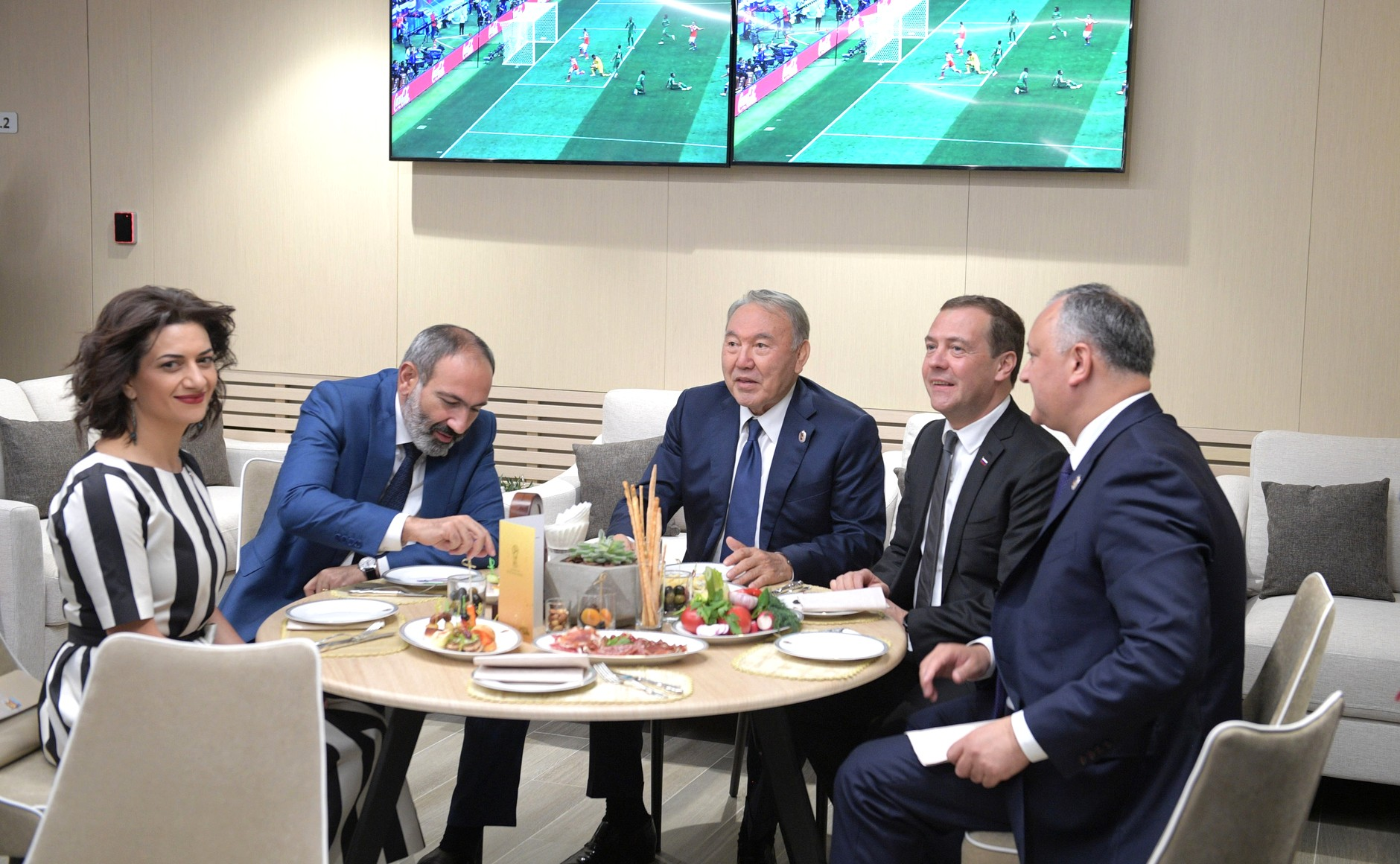
Hakobyan with Nikol Pashinyan, Kazakh President Nursultan Nazarbayev, Russian Prime Minister Dmitry Medvedev and Moldovan President Igor Dodon.

Hakobyan became the official partner of the prime minister on 8 May 2018.

On 27 February 2026, Hakobyan announced that she had broken off her relationship with Nikol Pashinyan. Pashinyan noted their marriage was not registered with the Armenian Apostolic Church and wrote "In all my difficult days for the past 30 years, she has stood by my side and been my refuge and support. I am not sure that I have been like that for her. Perhaps I have caused her more bitterness, for which I apologize."

=== Charity work ===
Just after the election, Hakobyan initiated a meeting with the charitable organisations involved in pediatric cancer and specialists. During the meeting session under her leadership, a working group to improve the state of pediatric cancer in Armenia was formed. Currently, a charitable foundation, of which Hakobyan is the Honorary President, is in the formation process to support the development of pediatric oncology and hematology in Armenia.

From 2018 to 2020, Hakobyan served as the Chairwoman of the Board of Trustees of the City of Smile Charitable Foundation. In this capacity, she facilitated cooperation among pediatric oncology organizations and specialists, which led to the formation of a dedicated working group tasked with improving pediatric cancer treatment conditions in Armenia.

In 2018, Hakobyan co-founded the My Step Charitable Foundation and served as the Chairwoman of its Board of Trustees until 2024, when she transitioned to the role of Executive Director. Following this transition, Lena Nazaryan was appointed as the Chairwoman of the Board of Trustees.

In July 2018, she launched the Women for Peace initiative, aimed at promoting dialogue and the role of women in peacebuilding.

On 7 September 2023, on behalf of the Government of the Republic of Armenia, Hakobyan personally handed over 1,000+ smartphones, tablets and laptops for primary schoolchildren at the Ministry of Education and Science of Ukraine in Kyiv, Ukraine. This was Armenia’s first humanitarian aid for Ukraine since the Russian invasion of Ukraine started in February 2022.

=== Second Nagorno-Karabakh War ===
During the Second Nagorno-Karabakh War, Hakobyan went through a week-long training program for combat. She founded the Erato Detachment, which is the first all-women military unit in the Armenian Armed Forces.

=== Foreign trips ===
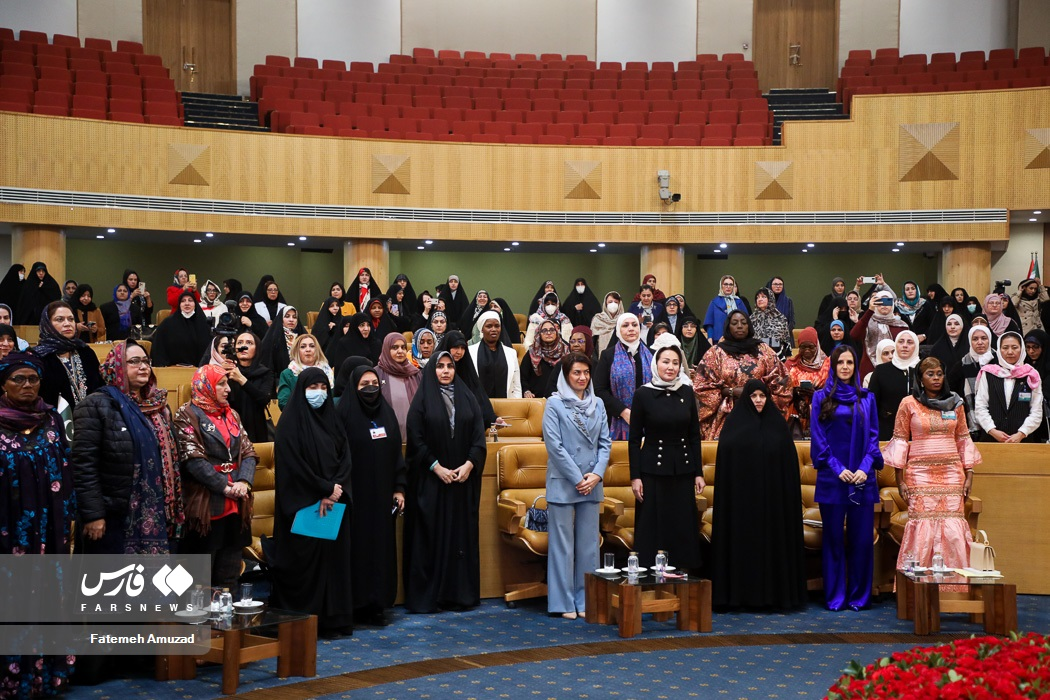
1st International Congress for the Women of Influence

From December 14 to 16, 2018, she visited Geneva, where she participated in various community meetings. Her itinerary included a visit to the "Lamps of Memory" (Les Réverbères de la Mémoire) memorial and attendance at the graduation ceremony of the Topalian College. Between September 19 and 21, 2018, she traveled to Saint Petersburg, to attend the Second Eurasian Women's Forum, titled "Women for Global Security and Sustainable Development". On February 1, 2019, she visited the Charité University Hospital in Berlin, where she met with Professor Angelika Eggert to discuss prospects for cooperation in the field of pediatric oncology. From July 7 to 9, 2019, she accompanied Nikol Pashinyan on an official visit to Singapore.

On 25 September 2019, she accompanied Nikol Pashinyan to New York, where she attended an official reception hosted by then-President Donald Trump in honor of the heads of delegations participating in the 74th session of the United Nations General Assembly.

On November 12, 2019, she accompanied Nikol Pashinyan to Paris, France, where she attended the 40th session of the UNESCO General Conference at UNESCO headquarters. Alongside heads of state and international delegations, she participated in the thematic discussion titled "Rethinking Learning." On March 4, 2020, in Washington, D.C., she attended the U.S. Department of State's International Women of Courage (IWOC) Awards ceremony. On May 26, 2022, she participated in the Women Political Leaders (WPL) Summit held in Davos, Switzerland. On November 8, 2022, she attended the Reykjavík Global Forum – Women Leaders in Reykjavík, Iceland.

From June 17 to 18, 2025, she participated in the workshop for First Ladies and Partners titled "Soft Power and Geopolitics" in Vienna. Between July 8 and 10, 2025, she attended the "Global First Ladies Academy" in New York, USA. On August 31, 2025, she accompanied Nikol Pashinyan to the Shanghai Cooperation Organization (SCO) Summit held in Beijing. On February 19, 2026, she met with Reverend Pannakarat, the initiator of the "Step for Peace" movement, in Fort Worth, Texas.

=== Learning Is Trendy movement ===
In October 2024, Hakobyan initiated the Learning is Trendy movement, aimed at promoting lifelong learning and expanding access to education.

== Personal life ==
Until 2026, she was in a relationship with Nikol Pashinyan, and they have four children (Ashot, Mariam, Shushan, and Arpi).

Honorary titles
| Preceded by Lilit Karapetyan; Acting | Spouse of the Prime Minister of Armenia; 2018–2026 | Vacant |
