= Rita Sargsyan =

First Lady of Armenia (1962–2020)

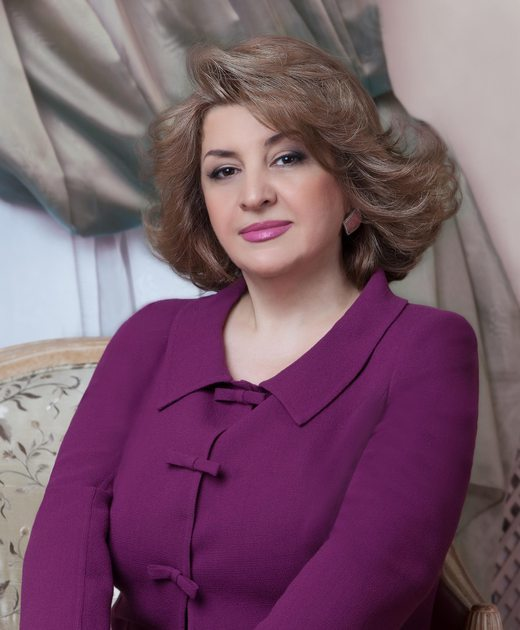

First Lady of Armenia
- In role 9 April 2008 – 9 April 2018
- President: Serzh Sargsyan
- Preceded by: Bella Kocharyan
- Succeeded by: Nouneh Sarkissian

Spouse of the Prime Minister of Armenia
- In role 17 April 2018 – 23 April 2018
- Prime Minister: Serzh Sargsyan
- Preceded by: Lilit Karapetyan
- Succeeded by: Lilit Karapetyan (Acting)
- In role 4 April 2007 – 9 April 2008; Acting: 25 March 2007 – 4 April 2007
- Prime Minister: Serzh Sargsyan
- Preceded by: Susanna Margaryan
- Succeeded by: Gohar Sargsyan

Personal details
- Born: Rita Aleksandri Dadayan; 6 March 1962 Stepanakert, Nagorno-Karabakh Autonomous Oblast, Soviet Union
- Died: 20 November 2020 (aged 58) Yerevan, Armenia
- Spouse: Serzh Sargsyan (m. 1983)
- Children: 2
- Profession: Music teacher
- Religion: Armenian Apostolic Church
- Website: Official website

Rita Aleksandri Sargsyan (née Dadayan; Armenian: Ռիտա Ալեքսանդրի Սարգսյան, née Dadayan (Դադայան), 6 March 1962 – 20 November 2020) was the wife of Serzh Sargsyan, the President of Armenia from 2008 to 2018.

She was born to a military family and was a music teacher by profession.

== Biography ==
In 1983, she married her husband Serzh. They have two daughters, Anush and Satenik and four grandchildren, Mariam, Rita, Ara, and Serzh.

=== Activities as First Lady ===
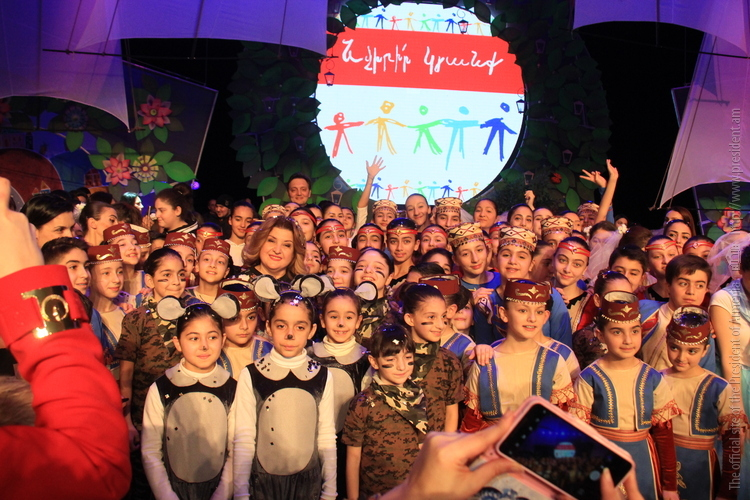
The First Lady of Armenia at the concert dedicated to the International Day for the Fight against Childhood Cancer

Rita Sargsyan sponsored the Donate Life charity foundation, which assists children suffering from blood cancer and other severe diseases, as well as the Autism and Aragil national foundations. Since 2010 on Sargsyan was the Chairperson of Board of Trustees of the Foundation. The following international competitions were held under the auspices of First Lady Sargsyan, with notable events having included the Aram Khachaturian International Contest of Classical Music and the Yerevan International Music Festival hosted by the Armenian National Philharmonic Orchestra.

== Death ==
On 20 November 2020, Rita Sargsyan died from COVID-19 at the age of 58. Condolences were given by Prime Minister Nikol Pashinyan, noting that she "led valuable social and public activities aimed at fostering cultural life in the country." President Armen Sarksyan personally visited Serzh to express his condolences.
