= Anahit Minasyan =

First Lady of Armenia

- Անահիտ Մինասյան

First Lady of Armenia
- Current
- Assumed role 13 March 2022
- President: Vahagn Khachaturyan
- Preceded by: Nouneh Sarkissian; Mariam Margaryan (acting)

Personal details
- Spouse: Vahagn Khachaturyan
- Children: 2

Anahit Minasyan (Armenian: Անահիտ Մինասյան) is the First Lady of Armenia since March 2022 as the wife of President of Armenia Vahagn Khachaturyan.

Not much is known about Minasyan's biography, as unlike it was done to previous First ladies, the President's office chose not to publish an official biography of Minasyan. Minasyan is known as possibly the least active of any First Lady in the country's history since independence.

== Career ==
Minasyan became First Lady of Armenia as a result of the 2022 Armenian presidential election, where her husband, Vahagn Khachaturyan, was elected president.

As reported in 2025, she worked as chief expert at the "Academician Emil Gabrielyan Center for Drug and Medical Technology Expertise" CJSC. She and her son have not declared their wealth for 2024.

== Personal life ==
Minasyan and her husband Vahagn Khachaturyan have two children, a son and a daughter, and two grandchildren together. Their son, Aram Khachaturyan, worked at the "Armenian Card" ("ARCA") Card Payment System CJSC.

In 2022, Minasyan was known to have possessed €2,480, $1,089, and an apartment in Yerevan purchased in 1997.

Honorary titles
Preceded by Mariam Margaryan; Acting	First Lady of Armenia; 2022–present	Current holder
