= Lyudmila Ter-Petrosyan =

First First Lady of Armenia, wife of the President of Armenia

- Людмила Тер-Петросян

First Lady of Armenia
- In role 11 November 1991 – 3 February 1998
- President: Levon Ter-Petrossian
- Preceded by: Office established
- Succeeded by: Bella Kocharyan

Personal details
- Born: Lyudmila Froimi Pleskovskaya; 20 December 1948 (age 77) Leningrad, Russian SFSR, Soviet Union
- Spouse: Levon Ter-Petrossian (m. 1972)
- Children: David Ter-Petrosyan

Lyudmila Froimovna Ter-Petrosyan (née Pleskovskaya; Russian: Людмила Фроимовна Тер-Петросян; Armenian: Լյուդմիլա Տեր-Պետրոսյան, born December 20, 1948) was the first First Lady of Armenia from 1991 to 1998, wife of the President of Armenia, Levon Ter-Petrosyan. She is the founder (1994) and leader of All-Armenian Women Union, a non-governmental organization working to protect the rights of women and children.

== Biography ==
Lyudmila Ter-Petrossian was born Pleskovskaya (Russian: Плесковская) in Leningrad, Soviet Union. Her father was an army officer who fought in World War II and her mother was a doctor who took part in the defense of Leningrad. She graduated from the Department of Germanistics of the Leningrad State University. In 1972, she married Levon Ter-Petrossian, then a young post-graduate student, and moved to Yerevan. During the 20 years, she worked at Armenian State Radio as a journalist and editor.

Since the 1990s, she became a public activist, working for the children's rights and supporting disabled children in Armenia. For her public activities in 1995 she was awarded by a medal from UNICEF. In 1996, at the initiative of Ter-Petrossian and the All Armenian Women's Union, the National Assembly of Armenia was one of the first among the post-USSR republics of to adopt a law on the rights of children. In 1997, the Developmental Services for Armenia (DSA) organization was established in Los Angeles by the initiative of Lyudmila Ter-Petrossian.

Ter-Petrossian was an honorary participant of different International conferences organized by Hillary Clinton, Rosalynn Carter, Anne-Aymone Giscard d'Estaing and others. She organized 4 International Women Conferences (1994, 2005, 2006, 2007) in Armenia. In 2006, she established an informal club for the women of the South Caucasus.

She has one son, David Ter-Petrossian, and four grandchildren.
