= Nouneh Sarkissian =

First Lady of Armenia from 2018 to 2022

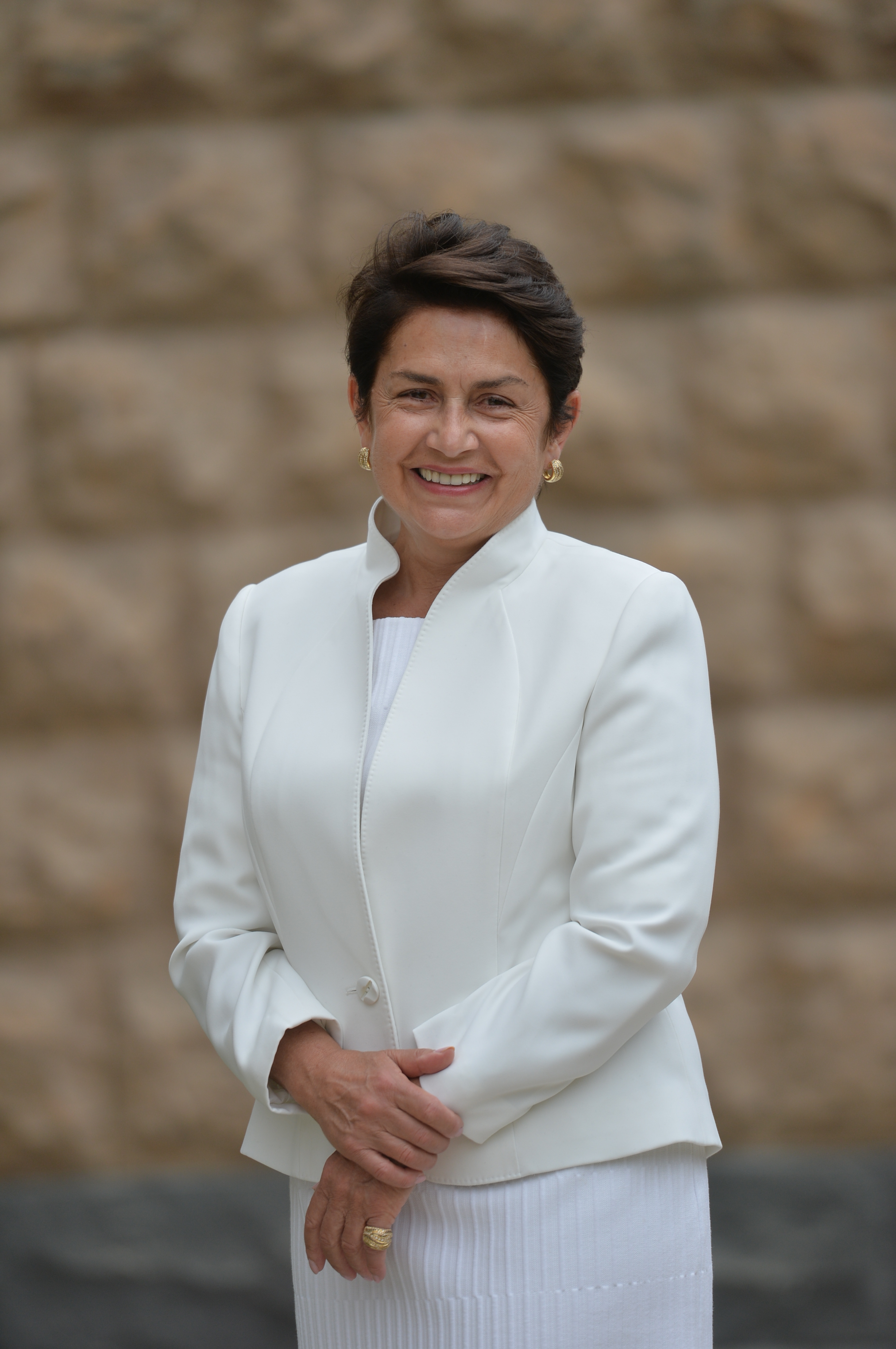
- Sarkissian in 2018

First Lady of Armenia
- In role 9 April 2018 – 1 February 2022
- President: Armen Sarkissian
- Preceded by: Rita Sargsyan
- Succeeded by: Mariam Margaryan (acting); Anahit Minasyan

Spouse of the Prime Minister of Armenia
- In office 4 November 1996 – 20 March 1997
- Prime Minister: Armen Sarkissian
- Preceded by: Vacant
- Succeeded by: Bella Kocharyan

Personal details
- Born: Նունե Սարգսյան; 26 March 1954 (age 72) Yerevan, Armenian SSR, Soviet Union
- Spouse: Armen Sarkissian (m. 1978)
- Children: 2
- Occupation: Author
- Religion: Armenian Apostolic Church
- Website: Official website

Nouneh Sarkissian (Note: Her surname is also rendered as Sargsyan.) (Armenian: Նունե Սարգսյան, born 26 March 1954) is an Armenian art historian and author. She is married to former Armenian President Armen Sarksyan and is the former First Lady of Armenia.

== Education ==
Nouneh Sarkissian graduated from the Department of Romano - Germanic Languages of Yerevan State University. Studied at Goldsmiths College, London University and graduated with MA degree in History of Arts. Received specialization in Art Studies at Sotheby’s Institute of Art. Later, continued her studies in painting and drawing at Westminster College, London.

== Professional activities ==
Nouneh Sarkissian worked at Matenadaran - the Mesrop Mashtots Scientific Research Institute of Ancient Manuscripts. She has authored essays and reviews on art, culture, and music which were published in Armenia, the United States, and a number of European countries. She also organized a number of exhibitions and concerts of classical music in different concert halls.

She is the author of more than two dozen children’s books in Armenian, Russian, and English. Some of her fairy tales have been published in Eastern Armenian, Western Armenian as well as in dialects of Artsakh, Gavar and Gyumri. Some of her fairy tales, such as the Bald Hedgehog, have been staged at the State Puppet Theater and Tzuk Mzuk has been on the stage of Karapet Puppet Theatre.

Nouneh Sarkissian was appointed by UNICEF an extraordinary defender of children.

== Personal life ==
In 1978, she married Armen Sarkissian. They have two sons, Vardan and Hayk Sargsyan, three grandchildren.

== Honours ==
=== Foreign honour ===
- Italy: Knight Grand Cross of the Order of Merit of the Italian Republic (25 July 2018)

== Notes ==
Honorary titles
Preceded by Rita Sargsyan	First Lady of Armenia; 2018–2022	Succeeded by Mariam Margaryan; Acting
