= Bella Kocharyan =

Former First Lady of Armenia

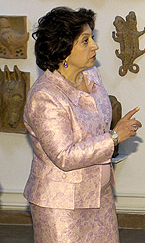
- Bella Kocharyan in 2005

First Lady of Armenia
- In role 9 April 1998 – 9 April 2008
- President: Robert Kocharyan
- Preceded by: Lyudmila Ter-Petrosyan
- Succeeded by: Rita Sargsyan

Spouse of the Prime Minister of Armenia
- In office 20 March 1997 – 9 April 1998
- Prime Minister: Robert Kocharyan
- Preceded by: Nouneh Sarkissian
- Succeeded by: Vacant

Personal details
- Born: 31 January 1954 (age 72) Stepanakert, Nagorno-Karabakh Autonomous Oblast, Soviet Union
- Spouse: Robert Kocharyan
- Children: Sedrak, Gayane, Levon

Bella Levoni Kocharyan (Armenian: Բելլա Լևոնի Քոչարյան; born 31 January 1954, Stepanakert) is the wife of former Armenian President Robert Kocharyan and is the former First Lady of Armenia.

Kocharyan graduated the Yerevan Medical Institute's Sanitary-Hygienic Medicine Department in 1978. She worked first as a doctor-bacteriologist and then as a doctor-epidemiologist at the sanitary-epidemiological station in Nagorno-Karabakh. She also held the position of the deputy chief physician of the regional sanitary-epidemiological station and during her final years there (1991-1993) she headed a department at the station.

Currently, she is the Honorary President of the All-Armenian Bone Marrow Donor Registry and the Honorary President of the Armenian Branch of Vladimir Spivakov's international benevolent fund Talented Children of Armenia.
