= Haykakan Zhamanak =

Newspaper in Armenia

Haykakan Zhamanak Armenian Times
- Founder: Nikol Pashinyan
- Publisher: Dareskizb
- Editor-in-chief: Anna Hakobyan
- Relaunched: 1999
- Language: Armenian, Russian
- Headquarters: 37 Israyelyan Street, Yerevan, Armenia
- ISSN: 1829-2380
- Website: www.armtimes.com

Haykakan Zhamanak (Armenian: Հայկական Ժամանակ, Armenian Times) is a daily newspaper in Armenian published in Yerevan, Armenia, since 1999. It is a follow-up of the daily newspaper Oragir (Օրագիր) established in 1998 and shut down by the Armenian government during its clamp-down on opposition. Armenian journalist Nikol Pashinyan was the long serving editor-in-chief of Haykakan Zhamanak from 1999 until 2008, when Pashinyan went underground and then was imprisoned for his political activism․ On December 23, 1999 Pashinyan was beaten by a "gang" of dozen men who were reportedly led by a local businessman who was angered by an article in Haykakan Zhamanak that accused him of corruption. In 2004 Radio Free Europe/Radio Liberty described the newspaper as "sympathetic to Armenia’s former leadership [Ter-Petrosyan's government], is known for its hard-hitting coverage of President Robert Kocharian and his government."

With the imprisonment of Pashinyan, the editorial responsibilities passed to his wife Anna Hakobyan. The paper at that time was affiliated with the minor opposition Democratic Homeland Party, led by former MP Petros Makeyan which had split off from the Levon Ter-Petrosyan led Pan-Armenian National Movement. Pashinyan was eventually released and was elected to the Armenian parliament and later became Prime Minister of Armenia. Haykakan Zhamanak has been described as Pashinyan's "family newspaper."
