= Vahagn Khachaturyan =

President of Armenia since 2022

His Excellency Vahagn Khachaturyan
- Վահագն Խաչատուրյան
- Khachaturyan in 2022

5th President of Armenia
- Incumbent
- Assumed office 13 March 2022
- Prime Minister: Nikol Pashinyan
- Preceded by: Armen Sarkissian; Alen Simonyan (Acting)

Minister of High-Tech Industry
- In office 4 August 2021 – 3 March 2022
- Prime Minister: Nikol Pashinyan
- Preceded by: Hayk Chobanyan
- Succeeded by: Davit Sahakyan (Acting); Robert Khachatryan

Mayor of Yerevan
- In office 4 December 1992 – 22 February 1996
- Preceded by: Hambardzum Galstyan
- Succeeded by: Ashot Mirzoyan

Personal details
- Born: 22 April 1959 (age 67) Sisian, Armenian SSR, Soviet Union
- Party: Independent
- Other political affiliations: Armenian National Congress (2013–2022)
- Spouse: Anahit Minasyan
- Children: 2
- Occupation: Economist
- Website: www.vahagnhacaturyan.com

Vahagn Garniki Khachaturyan (Armenian: Վահագն Գառնիկի Խաչատուրյան, pronounced [vɑˈhɑɡən χɑt͡ʃʰɑtuɾˈjɑn]; born 22 April 1959) is an Armenian economist and politician who has served as the fifth and current president of Armenia since 2022. He previously served as mayor of Yerevan from 1992 to 1996 and minister of High-Tech Industry from 2021 to 2022 under Prime Minister Nikol Pashinyan.

He was a member of the Armenian National Congress (ANC) until his resignation in 2022, although he had not participated in party activities since 2017. He led the ANC list in the 2013 Yerevan City Council election.

== Early life and career ==
Khachaturyan was born in 1959 in Sisian. He graduated from the Yerevan Institute of National Economy in 1980, with the qualification of an economist. From 1980 to 1982, he served in the Soviet Army. After fulfilling his national service, he carried out, for the next decade, pedagogical activities at the Yerevan Institute, working for the first eight years at the HrazdanMash (Hrazdan Instrumental Production) Enterprise as an economist and then at the Mars Factory as the deputy general director until 1992.

== Political career ==
From 1990 to 1996, Khachaturyan was a member of the Yerevan City Council, and from 1992 to 1996 he held the mayorship of Yerevan. He was a deputy in the National Assembly of Armenia from 1995 to 1999. From 1996 to 1998, he was an adviser to President Levon Ter-Petrosyan.

In 2002, he became Vice President of the Center for Political Science, Law, and Economic Research. He was appointed to the government as Minister of High-Tech Industry in 2021.

== Presidency (2022–present) ==
List of foreign visits by Vahagn Khachaturyan
Date(s)	Country	Locations	Type of Visit
May 30, 2022	Georgia	Tbilisi	First official foreign visit. Met with President Salome Zourabichvili and PM Irakli Garibashvili to discuss regional cooperation.
June 16–18, 2022	Russia	St. Petersburg	Attended the St. Petersburg International Economic Forum (SPIEF).
September 18–19, 2022	United Kingdom	London	Attended the State funeral of Queen Elizabeth II and the official reception hosted by King Charles III.
October 5–6, 2022	Bulgaria	Sofia	Met with President Rumen Radev.
November 6–8, 2022	Egypt	Sharm El Sheikh	Attended the 2022 United Nations Climate Change Conference (COP27).
January 15–17, 2023	Estonia	Tallinn	Met with President Alar Karis, and Prime Minister Kaja Kallas.
January 16–19, 2023	Switzerland	Davos	Attended the World Economic Forum (WEF).
April 18–20, 2023	Lithuania	Vilnius	Met with President Gitanas Nausėda.
May 5–6, 2023	United Kingdom	London	Attended the Coronation of Charles III and Camilla.
May 22–24, 2023	Qatar	Doha	Participated in the Qatar Economic Forum and held talks with Emir Tamim bin Hamad Al Thani.
July 24–25, 2023	Vatican City	Vatican City / Rome	Received in an audience by Pope Francis. Held talks with Cardinal Secretary of State Pietro Parolin and Italian President Sergio Mattarella.
October 11–12, 2023	Turkmenistan	Ashgabat	Met with President Serdar Berdimuhamedov.
December 9–12, 2023	Argentina	Buenos Aires	Attended the presidential inauguration ceremony of Javier Milei.
December 13–15, 2023	Uruguay	Montevideo	Met with President Luis Lacalle Pou.
January 15–18, 2024	Switzerland	Davos	Attended the World Economic Forum (WEF).
February 5-7, 2024	Hungary	Budapest	State visit
February 16–18, 2024	Germany	Munich	Attended the Munich Security Conference (MSC).
April 22–23, 2024	Georgia	Tbilisi	Met with Prime Minister Irakli Kobakhidze.
May 27–29, 2024	Kazakhstan	Astana	Held talks with Kazakh President Kassym-Jomart Tokayev.
July 25–27, 2024	France	Paris	Attended the official opening ceremony of the 2024 Summer Olympics at the invitation of the IOC and President Emmanuel Macron.
October 2024	Germany	Berlin	
October 11, 2024	Turkmenistan	Ashgabat	Participated in an international forum commemorating the 300th anniversary of the poet Magtymguly Pyragy.
May 2025	Vatican City	Vatican City	Inauguration of Pope Leo XIV
June 2025	France	Paris	
January 2026	Switzerland	Davos	Attended the annual World Economic Forum (WEF) sessions.
February 2026	Greece	Athens	State visit.

=== Nomination and election ===
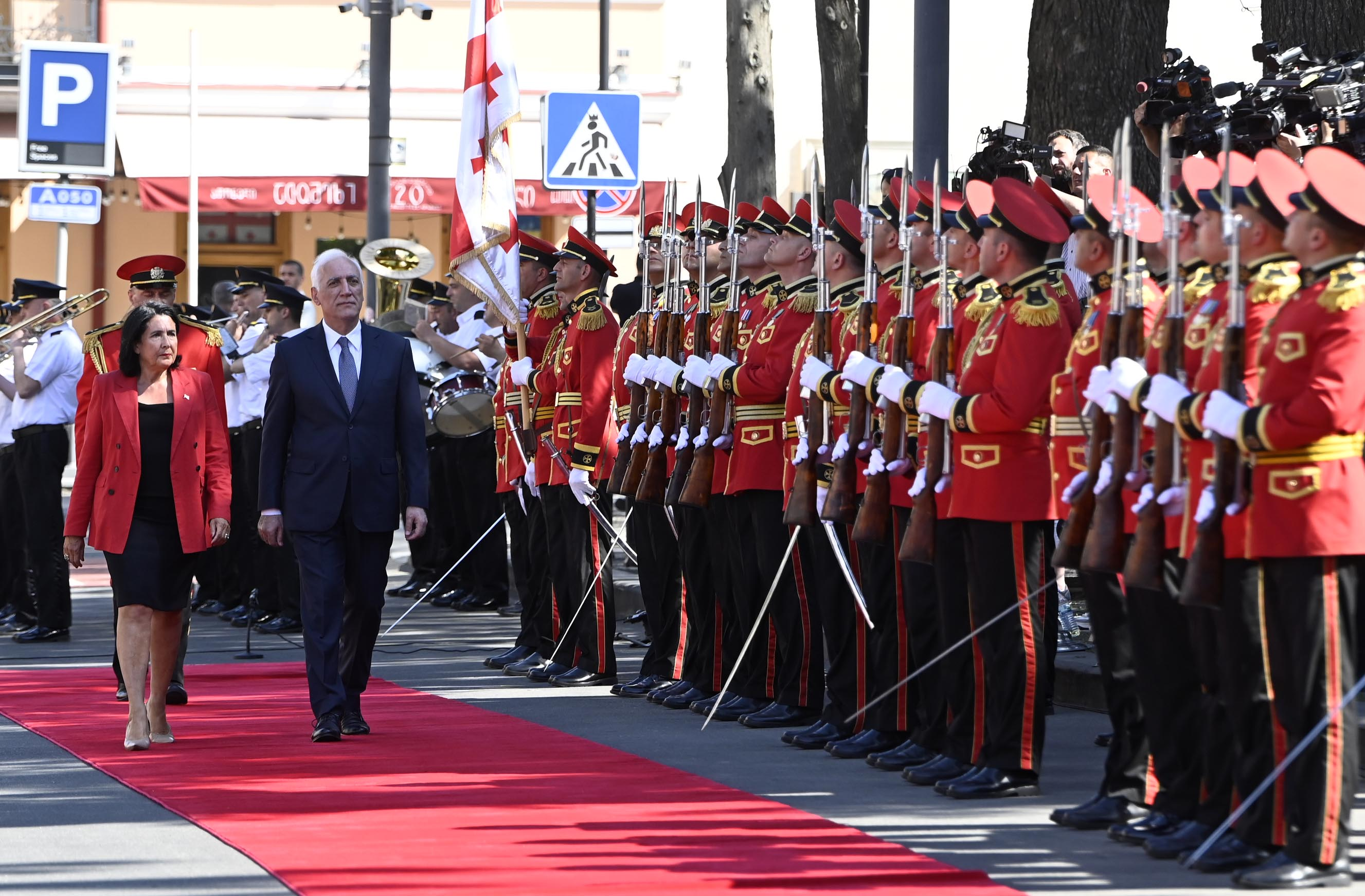
Salome Zourabichvili and President Khachaturyan meeting in Tbilisi, 30 May 2022.

Following the resignation of President of Armenia Armen Sarkissian in January 2022, the ruling Civil Contract Party nominated Khachaturyan for the presidency. He was elected president by the Armenian parliament in the second round of voting. He was inaugurated on 13 March 2022.

=== Domestic activities ===
Khachaturyan actively promotes Armenia's high-tech sector as a key area of economic diversification.

=== Foreign activities ===
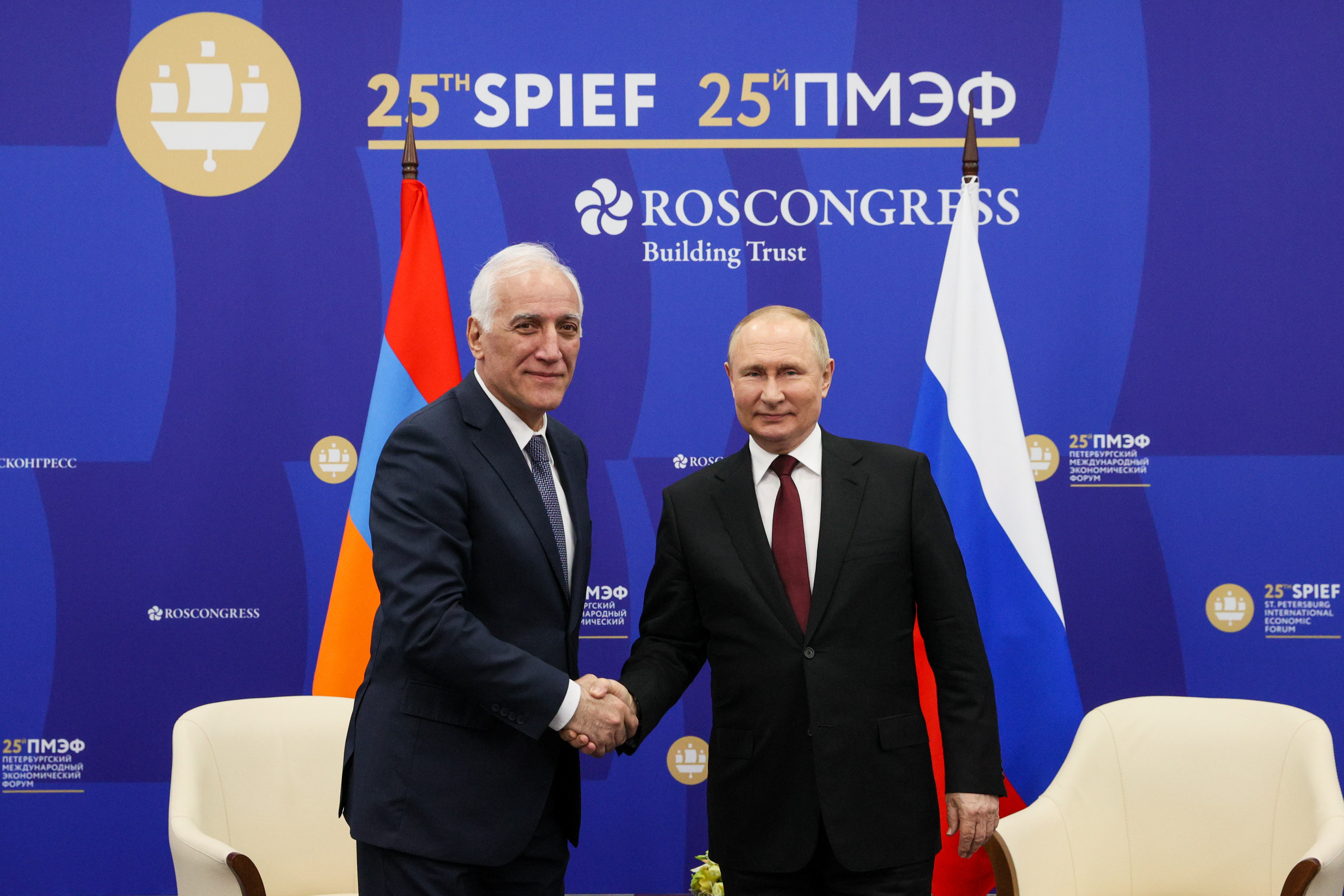
Khachaturyan and Russian President Vladimir Putin, 16 June 2022

In June 2022, he visited the St. Petersburg International Economic Forum on its 25th anniversary in St. Petersburg, Russia. In February 2024, he visited Hungary, the first state visit since the restoration of diplomatic relations and the second visit of an Armenian president since 1989. He met with President Katalin Novák, Speaker László Kövér, Prime Minister Viktor Orbán and representatives of the Armenian community of Hungary. He also visited Pázmány Péter Catholic University.

In an interview with Russian media outlet RTVI, Khachaturyan declared that Armenia had transitioned away from a "little brother" dynamic with Russia in favor of a new and equal partnership with Moscow.

== Personal life ==
He is married to Anahit Minasyan and has two children. Besides his native Armenian, he also speaks Russian and English.

== Other activities ==
- 2000: Founding member of the ARMAT Center for Democracy and Civil Society Development
- 2006: Founding member of the social and political initiatives "Aylyntrank"
- 2019–2021: Member of the Board of the Armeconombank

== Awards ==
- Jubilee Medal "In honor of the 300th anniversary of Magtymguly Fragi" (11 October 2024, Turkmenistan)
- Knight Grand Cross of the Order of the Savior (2026, Greece)
- Knight Grand Cross of the Legion of Honor (2026, France)

Political offices
Preceded by Hambardzum Galstyan	Mayor of Yerevan; 1992–1996	Succeeded by Ashot Mirzoyan
Preceded by Hayk Chobanyan	Minister of High-Tech Industry; 2021–2022	Succeeded by Davit Sahakyan; Acting
Preceded by Alen Simonyan; Acting	President of Armenia; 2022–present	Incumbent
