= Serzh Sargsyan =

President of Armenia from 2008 to 2018

- Սերժ Սարգսյան
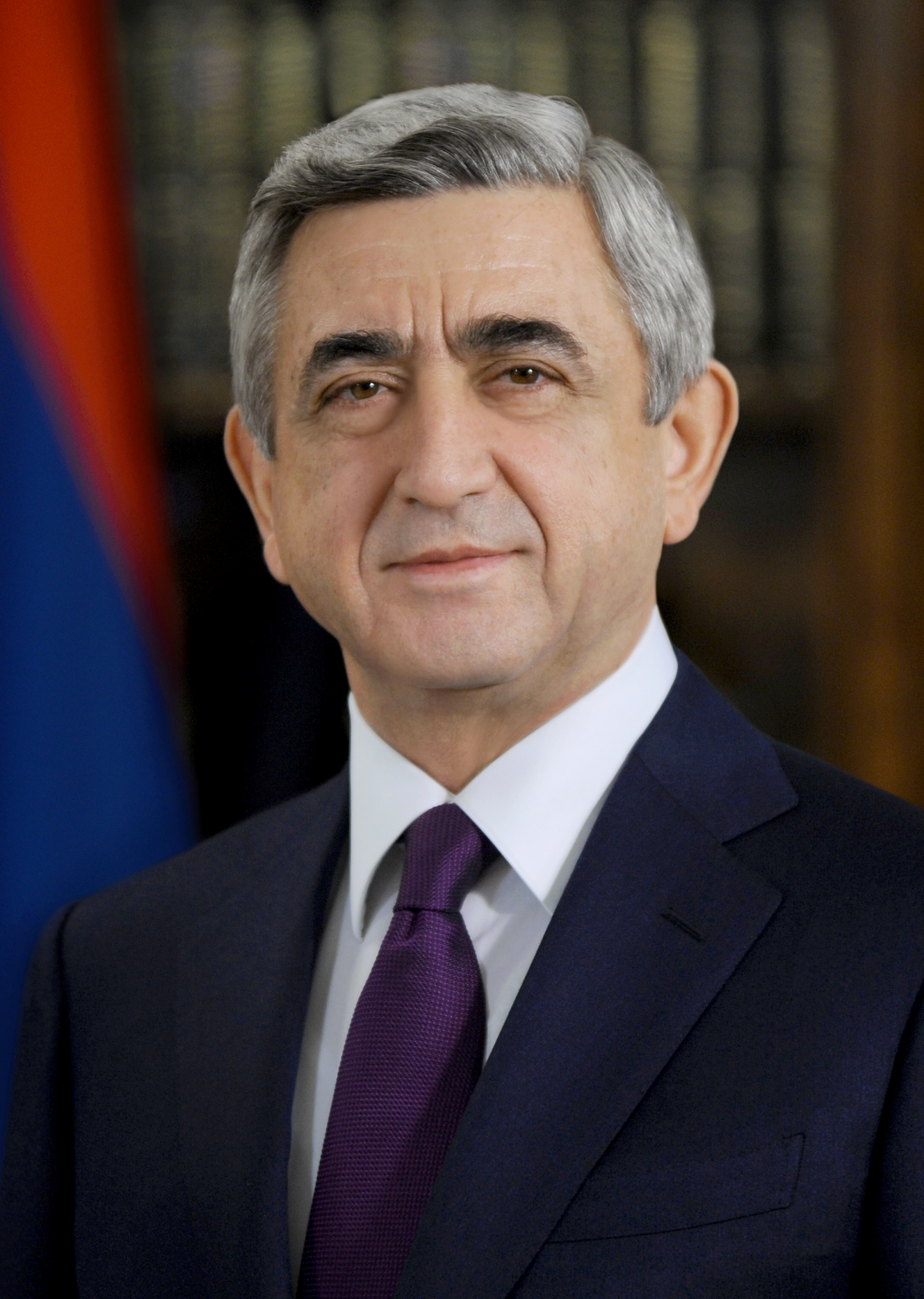
- Official portrait, 2013

3rd President of Armenia
- In office 9 April 2008 – 9 April 2018
- Prime Minister: Tigran Sargsyan; Hovik Abrahamyan; Karen Karapetyan
- Preceded by: Robert Kocharyan
- Succeeded by: Armen Sarkissian

11th and 15th Prime Minister of Armenia
- In office 17 April 2018 – 23 April 2018
- President: Armen Sarkissian
- Preceded by: Karen Karapetyan (Acting)
- Succeeded by: Karen Karapetyan (Acting)
- In office 4 April 2007 – 9 April 2008; Acting: 25 March 2007 – 4 April 2007
- President: Robert Kocharyan
- Preceded by: Andranik Margaryan
- Succeeded by: Tigran Sargsyan

Minister of Defence
- In office 20 May 2000 – 26 March 2007
- Prime Minister: Andranik Margaryan
- Preceded by: Vagharshak Harutiunyan
- Succeeded by: Mikael Harutyunyan
- In office 21 August 1993 – 17 May 1995
- Prime Minister: Hrant Bagratyan
- Preceded by: Vazgen Manukyan
- Succeeded by: Vazgen Sargsyan

Minister of Interior and National Security
- In office 4 November 1996 – 11 June 1999
- Prime Minister: Armen Sarkissian; Robert Kocharyan; Armen Darbinyan
- Preceded by: Vano Siradeghyan
- Succeeded by: Suren Abrahamyan

Personal details
- Born: Serzhik Azati Sargsyan; 30 June 1954 (age 72) Stepanakert, Nagorno-Karabakh Autonomous Oblast, Soviet Union
- Party: Communist Party (?–1988); Pan-Armenian National Movement (1989–?); Republican Party (2006–present)
- Spouse: Rita Sargsyan (m. 1983; died 2020)
- Children: 2
- Education: Yerevan State University
- Website: www.serzhsargsyan.com/en

Military service
- Allegiance: USSR; Nagorno-Karabakh Republic
- Branch/service: Soviet Army; Nagorno-Karabakh Defense Army
- Years of service: 1972–1974; 1989–1992
- Battles/wars: First Nagorno-Karabakh War

Serzh Azati Sargsyan (Armenian: Սերժ Ազատի Սարգսյան, pronounced [sɛɾʒ sɑɾkʰəsˈjɑn]; born 30 June 1954) is an Armenian politician who served as the third President of Armenia from 2008 to 2018, and twice as the Prime Minister of Armenia from 2007 to 2008 and again from 17 to 23 April 2018, when he was forced to resign in the 2018 Armenian revolution.

He won the February 2008 presidential election with the backing of the ruling Republican Party of Armenia, a party in which he serves as chairman, and took office in April 2008. On 18 February 2013, he was re-elected as president and served the entire term.

Despite pledging in 2014 not to become prime minister again while supporting an amendment of the constitution in 2015 that would allow it, Sargsyan was again elected prime minister in April 2018, in what opposition figures described as a "power grab". Six days after taking office, Sargsyan resigned after large-scale protests. Sargsyan is currently the leader of the Republican Party, which was the ruling party of Armenia from 1999 to 2018 and is currently represented in parliament as a part of the opposition I Have Honor Alliance.

== Early life and career ==
Serzh Sargsyan (born Serzhik Azati Sargysan) was born on 30 June 1954 in Stepanakert in the Nagorno-Karabakh Autonomous Oblast. He is the son of Azat Avetisi Sargsyan (1929–2013) and Nora Sargsyan․ His father's family hailed from the village of Tegh in the Armenian SSR, and moved to Stepanakert after the arrest of Serzh Sargsyan's grandfather during the 1937 Great Purge. He entered Yerevan State University in 1971 and served in the Soviet Armed Forces in the Ural region from 1971 to 1972. He began his career in 1975 at the Electrical Devices Factory in Yerevan. He graduated from the Philological Department of Yerevan State University in 1979. In 1983, he married his wife, Rita (née Dadayan). In addition to his native Armenian, he is fluent in Russian and also knows Azerbaijani. He is not related to the former Prime Minister of Armenia, Tigran Sargsyan, who served under him, nor to his successor as President Armen Sarkissian.

== Political career ==
=== Early career ===
Starting in 1979, Sargsyan held several positions in the Stepanakert Komsomol Committee: first as division head, then second secretary and first secretary (his long-time political ally Robert Kocharyan served as his deputy). He then became the Stepanakert City Committee Propaganda Division Head, the Nagorno-Karabakh Regional Committee Communist Organizations' Unit Instructor, and finally became assistant to Genrikh Poghosyan, the First Secretary of the Nagorno-Karabakh Regional Committee.

In November 1989, Sargsyan was a delegate from Nagorno-Karabakh to the first congress of the Pan-Armenian National Movement. He was elected to the Supreme Council of Armenia in 1990. During the First Nagorno-Karabakh War, Sargsyan was involved in organizing the defense of Nagorno-Karabakh and the formation of the NKR Defense Army in various capacities. In January 1992, when the first government of the Nagorno-Karabakh Republic (NKR) was formed with Oleg Yesayan as prime minister, Sargsyan was appointed head of the Defense Committee, a position he held until the dissolution of the government in August 1992. Sargsyan then became a member of the seven-man State Defense Committee of the NKR (effectively the government of the NKR) which was formed in August 1992. Sargsyan held the position of minister of the army within the State Defense Committee.

From 1993 to 1995 he served his first term as Armenia's Minister of Defense under President Levon Ter-Petrosyan. In 1995 he became Minister of National Security of Armenia (initially called the State Security Department) and from 1996 to 1999 he concurrently served as Minister of Interior. In February 1998, Sargsyan, along with then-Prime Minister Robert Kocharyan and Defense Minister Vazgen Sargsyan, forced President Ter-Petrosyan to resign in order to prevent him from accepting a peace plan for the Nagorno-Karabakh conflict put forward by international mediators in September 1997. The proposal envisioned the return of most of the Armenian-occupied territories surrounding Nagorno-Karabakh to Azerbaijan in exchange for security guarantees, but left the final resolution of the status of Nagorno-Karabakh for future negotiations. From 1999 to 2000 he served as the Chief of Staff for President Robert Kocharyan, and then served once again as the Defense Minister of Armenia from 2000 to 2007. He was also the Secretary of the National Security Council led by President Kocharyan from 1999 to 2007. On 4 April 2007 Sargsyan was appointed as the Prime Minister of Armenia, following the sudden death of Andranik Margaryan.

=== Presidential election ===
Sargsyan, with President Kocharyan's backing, was viewed as the strongest contender for the post of the President of Armenia in the February 2008 presidential election. Full provisional results showed him winning about 53% of the vote, a first round majority, well ahead of second place candidate Levon Ter-Petrosyan. The 2008 Presidential election was hailed as largely democratic by OSCE, the European Union (EU) and Western monitors.

Ter-Petrosyan's supporters, disputing the official results, held large protests in Yerevan for over a week following the election, until they were violently broken up on 1 March; ten people (eight protestors and two police officers) were killed, and a state of emergency was imposed for 20 days, ending on 20 March 2008.

== Presidency (2008–2018) ==
Serzh Sargsyan was sworn in as president at the Yerevan Opera House on 9 April 2008. Referring to the "painful events" that followed the election, he "urge[d] everybody to look forward, together, to seek and find the way for reconciliation, development, and future of Armenia." He appointed Tigran Sargsyan, who had been the Chairman of the Central Bank and is not a member of a political party, as Prime Minister. According to the Freedom House report "In 2011, the government took concrete steps to fulfill longstanding and often repeated promises to confront corruption. E-government services reduced opportunities for bribery, while new regulations and stricter enforcement led to higher numbers of corruption lawsuits and fines against senior officials and large companies. Owing to a more consolidated government effort to eradicate corruption, Armenia's corruption rating improve[d] from 5.50 to 5.25."

During Sargsyan's presidency the record of the freedom of speech and the freedom of press in general also improved in Armenia. Internet penetration rose sharply – from 6.2 percent in 2008 to 37 percent in 2011, providing greater access to online media, which rapidly grew in number, including blogosphere – with over 10,000 bloggers in 2011.

After the elections Sargsyan also authorized opposition rallies to take place in Yerevan and pledged to comply with the Council of Europe's demands for an end to the government's crackdown on the opposition.

Civil society also grew considerably during Sargsyan's presidency, with the number of non-governmental organizations growing at a higher rate and with civic activists succeeding in raising public awareness and holding important campaigns in the sphere of human rights, environmental protection and social justice. However, according to Freedom House, public advocacy still had limited impact on public policy.

=== Economy ===
The start of Sargsyan's presidency coincided with the Great Recession. In 2009, Armenia's GDP contracted over 14%, which according to the World Bank was the fifth worst in the world that year after the three Baltic states and Ukraine. GDP growth subsequently stabilized at around 3% by 2013. As of 2014, Armenia's GDP is below the pre-crisis levels. During his first term of presidency, the official poverty rate doubled and reached 32.4% in 2012. According to official data, some 213,000 people have left Armenia from 2008 to 2013. In 2012, Armenia was ranked 39th out of 179 economies according to the Index of Economic Freedom and ranked 19th freest among the 43 countries in the Europe region.

In September 2013 and under Sargsyan's direction, Armenia announced its intentions of joining the Eurasian Economic Union with Belarus, Kazakhstan and Russia. The Eurasian Economic Union (EAEU or EEU) is an economic union of Belarus, Kazakhstan and Russia, and came into force on 1 January 2015. Treaties aiming for Armenia's accession to the Eurasian Economic Union was signed on 9 October 2014. Armenia's accession treaty came into force on 2 January 2015. The Eurasian Economic Union has an integrated single market of 176 million people and a gross domestic product of over 4 trillion U.S. dollars (PPP). The EEU introduces the free movement of goods, capital, services and people and provides for common transport, agriculture and energy policies, with provisions for a single currency and greater integration in the future.

=== Foreign policy ===
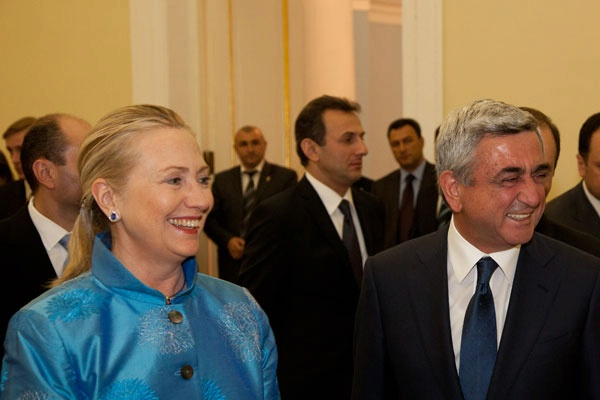
Sargsyan and U.S. State Secretary Hillary Clinton in Yerevan, 4 June 2012

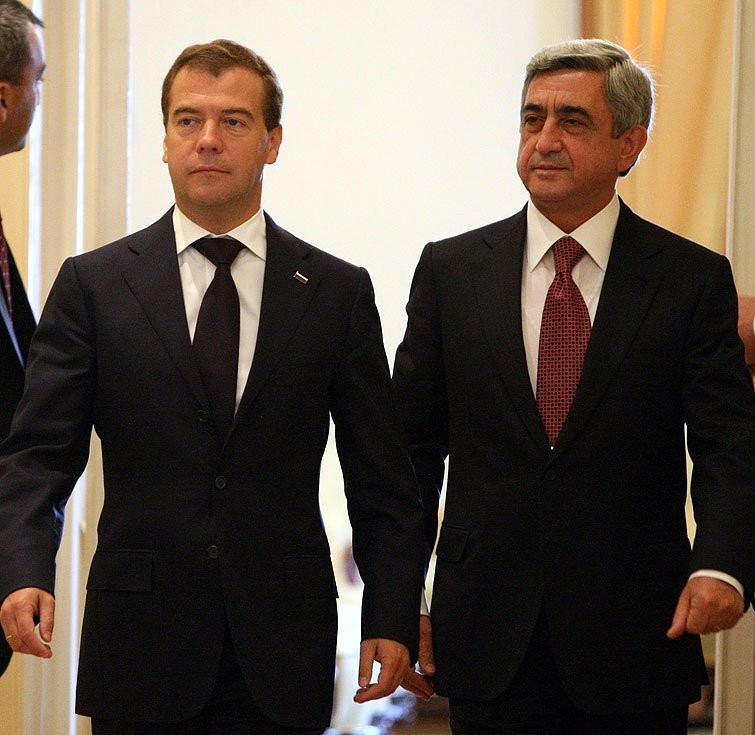
Dmitry Medvedev in Armenia, 20 August 2010

==== Nagorno-Karabakh ====
Sargsyan made his first address in front of the 63rd session of the United Nations General Assembly in New York on 25 September 2008. In his speech he referenced the 2008 South Ossetia conflict and emphasized the need for the United Nations to help bring peaceful resolution to armed conflicts around the world, including the one in Nagorno-Karabakh. He also mentioned how Azerbaijan's military buildup along with increasing war rhetoric and threats risked causing renewed problems in the South Caucasus.

Sargsyan continued the policy towards the peaceful resolution of the Nagorno-Karabakh conflict pursued by his predecessors, which constitutes one of the main goals of the Armenian foreign policy. Sargsyan repeatedly stated that the Armenian side is interested in finding a just and exclusively peaceful solution to the conflict and that the OSCE Minsk Group is the viable format within which the peace talks should continue. He continued negotiations with Azerbaijan and had a number of meetings with the president of Azerbaijan within the framework of OSCE Minsk Group. On 2 November 2008, Ilham Aliyev and Serzh Sargsyan traveled to Moscow for talks with Dmitry Medvedev. The talks ended in the three Presidents signing a declaration confirming their commitment to continue talks. The two presidents met again in 2009 in Saint Petersburg and on 22 November 2009, together with several world leaders, in Munich where President Aliyev once more threatened to resort to military force to reestablish control over the region if the two sides did not reach an agreeable settlement.

Sargsyan blames the Azerbaijani side for hampering the peace process and for pursuing an openly anti-Armenian stance. According to him, the anti-Armenian policies of Azerbaijan, such as "state-supported falsifications of history", "hostile propaganda against Armenia and Armenians" and "military build-up" prove that Azerbaijan does not want peace.

The most vivid expression of anti-Armenian policies of Azerbaijan was the hero's welcome given to the convicted ax murderer Ramil Safarov who had brutally killed Armenian officer Gurgen Margaryan during the NATO's Partnership for Peace program in Budapest in 2004. The fact that after his extradition to Azerbaijan in 2012 Safarov was pardoned by president Aliyev, promoted to the rank of major, given an apartment with over eight years of back pay and was made a national hero, hampers the negotiation process and proves, in Sargsyan's words, that "the Azeri propaganda brings up an entire generation in the atmosphere of xenophobia and intolerance."

Sargsyan has also clearly stated:

The Armenophobic and aggressive stance of Azerbaijan reinforces our conviction that Nagorno-Karabakh has no future within Azerbaijan. Moreover, Azerbaijan has neither legal nor political or moral grounds to claim over Nagorno-Karabakh.

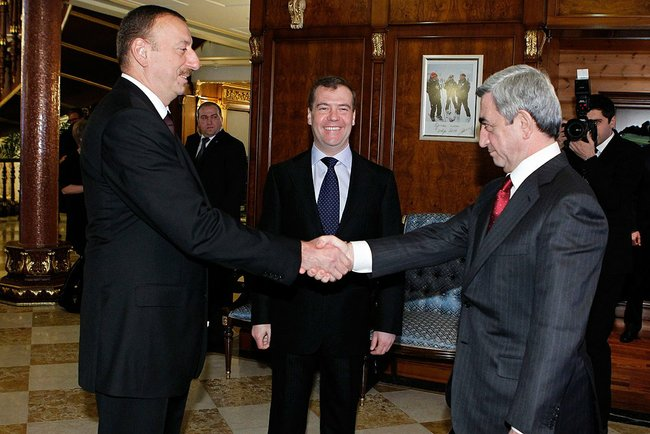
Serzh Sargsyan and Azerbaijan's Ilham Aliyev, 23 January 2012

In his speech made at the British Chatham House Sargsyan said:

Our belief is that the settlement of the Karabakh conflict should be based on human rights and the will of the Karabakh people… It is the only way to achieve lasting, feasible, and peaceful settlement. The alternative to this settlement is the forcing of the Karabakh people back into Azerbaijan, which will inevitably lead to attempts of new ethnic cleansing of Armenians in Karabakh. There is no alternative here."

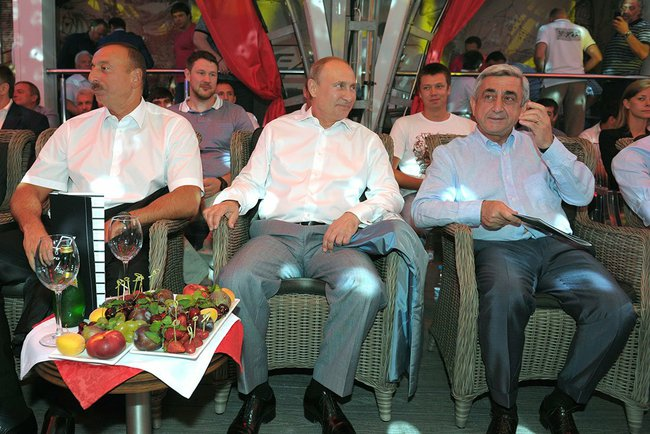
Russian President Vladimir Putin, Ilham Aliyev and Serzh Sargsyan in Sochi, 9 August 2014

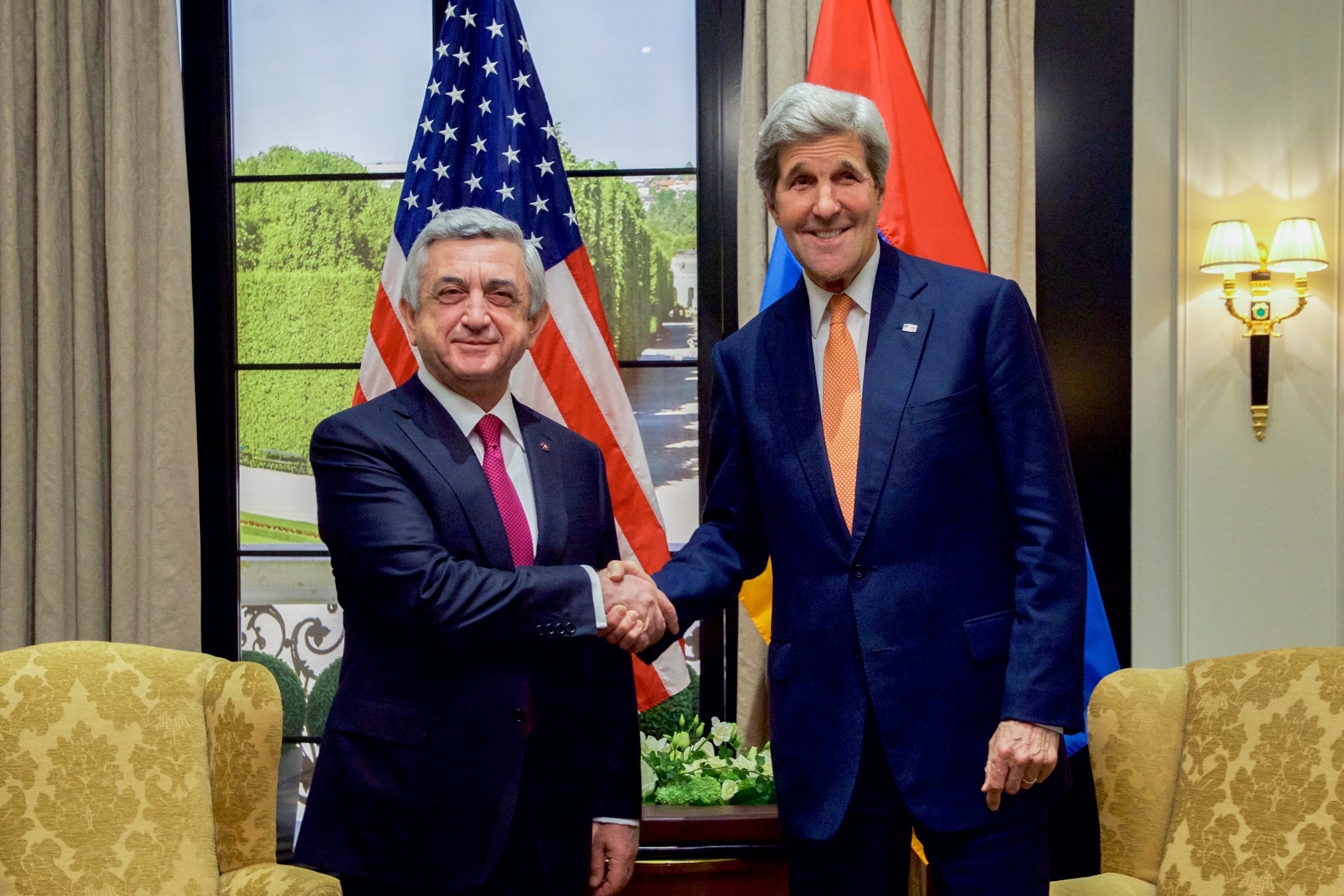
Sargsyan with U.S. Secretary of State John Kerry, 16 May 2016

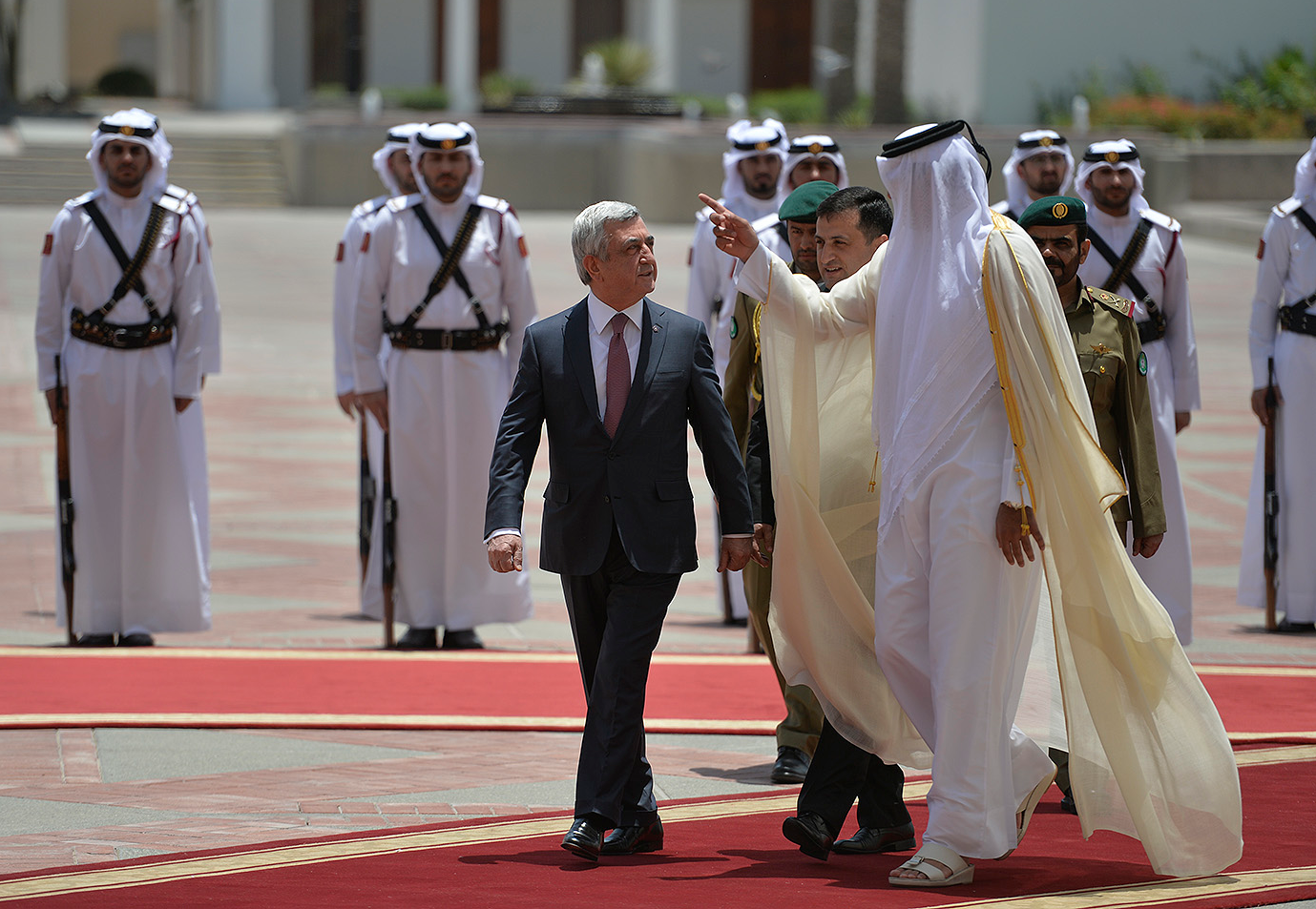
Sargsyan in Doha, Qatar, 24 July 2017

Responding to the persistent war rhetoric of Azerbaijan, Sargsyan has condemned it as a violation of the norms of the international law, as the parties had signed a truce which Azerbaijan, the "defeated aggressor", had asked for.

He repeatedly said that his country is categorically against the resumption of military hostilities, but at the same time is ready to counter any military aggression. In 2014, Sargsyan stated "We don't want war and never wanted, but at that time [i.e. during Nagorno-Karabakh war] we had to defend our Motherland. If the time comes again, this time our blow will be final and deadly."

In this regard, Sargsyan declared that in the case of military aggression from Azerbaijan "Armenia will have no other choice but to recognize the Nagorno-Karabakh Republic de jure and to employ all its capabilities to ensure the security of the people of Artsakh."

Sargsyan met with Ilham Aliyev again in Russian-mediated talks in Kazan in June 2011, where the two sides reportedly came close to an agreement. The basic principles discussed at Kazan envisioned the return of five of the seven districts of Azerbaijan occupied by Armenia in exchange for "interim status" for Nagorno-Karabakh and the deployment of international peacekeepers, with the final status of the region to be decided by a legally-binding referendum. The proposals made at Kazan were ultimately rejected by the Azerbaijani side.

In his electoral program of 2013, Sargsyan promised to increase the security guarantees of Nagorno-Karabakh and its people given Azerbaijan's policy of Armenophobia. He also highlighted the importance of strengthening the defensive system of Armenia "as a factor restraining the Azerbaijani aggression and ensuring stability in the South Caucasus". He also promised to take all the necessary efforts to ensure that Karabakh becomes a negotiating side in the peace talks as well as to foster the ties between Karabakh and the international community.

As for the position of Armenia concerning the independence of Kosovo, Sargsyan stated that "Armenia's possible recognition of Kosovo's independence will not strain the Armenian-Russian relations" but also noted that the "Kosovo recognition issue needs serious discussion... Armenia has always been an adherent to the right of nations to self-determination and in this aspect we welcome Kosovo's independence."

In April 2016, Sargsyan led Armenia through the 2016 Nagorno-Karabakh conflict (also known as the Four-Day War or the April War), the most significant outbreak of violence on the Nagorno-Karabakh line of contact after the 1994 ceasefire and before the 2020 Nagorno-Karabakh war. The four days of fighting resulted in at least dozens of deaths and the loss of approximately 800 hectares of land. Sargsyan described the outcome of the four-day clashes as a victory for Armenia, although he faced criticism for shortcomings during the clashes as well as accusations that he had agreed to cede territory to Azerbaijan in the wake of the fighting. In order to stop this purported cession of territory, a group of armed men calling themselves "Daredevils of Sasun" seized a police headquarters in Yerevan in July 2016 and took hostages, demanding Sargsyan's resignation. The crisis, which coincided with mass protests in support of the attackers, ended with the surrender of the gunmen on 31 July 2016.

Reflecting on his presidency and the negotiation process after the 2020 Nagorno-Karabakh war, during which the Armenian side lost much of the territory it controlled in and around Nagorno-Karabakh, Sargsyan stated that he intended to achieve a final negotiated solution to the Nagorno-Karabakh conflict and that this was the reason for his decision to remain as prime minister in 2018, which led to protests that forced his resignation. He denied that he had deliberately delayed the negotiation process in order to maintain the status quo or that he had ever held the view that "not one inch of land" could be handed over to Azerbaijan in order to resolve the conflict. He added that he was "ready to bear the label of traitor, but resolve the [Nagorno-Karabakh] question."

==== Turkey ====
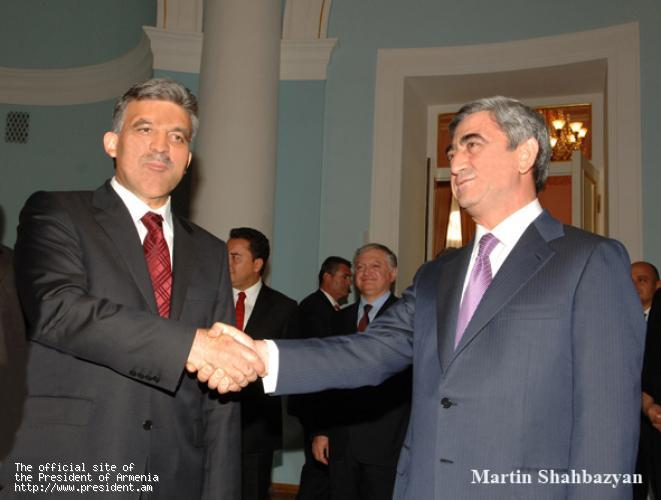
Sargsyan with Turkish President Abdullah Gül in Yerevan, 6 September 2008

Having been elected as a president for his first term in 2008, Sargsyan pledged to continue Armenia's policy towards Turkey, to normalize relations without any preconditions while continuing to strive for international recognition of the 1915 Armenian genocide.

Coming to power, Sargsyan took steps towards the normalization of ties with Turkey, a policy termed as "football diplomacy". In 2008, Sargsyan took a historical initiative to invite Turkish President Abdullah Gül to Armenia to watch a 2010 FIFA World Cup qualifier match between Armenia and Turkey. Abdullah Gül attended the game in Armenia while Serzh Sargsyan made a reciprocal visit to Turkey to watch the second match.

On 10 October 2009 the foreign ministers of Armenia and Turkey signed protocols on establishing diplomatic relations between the two countries without any preconditions. The accord also presupposed the opening of the border between Armenia and Turkey which had been closed by Turkey in 1993. The protocols were signed in Geneva, Switzerland under the international mediation, chiefly that of the United States.

Sargsyan's policy of rapprochement with Turkey received controversial reaction among the Armenian people. While one part was for the opening of the border and fostering trade with Turkey the other part was concerned that by this move Armenia would be forced to make concessions to Turkey in the most vital and strategic matters. Armenian influential opposition parties, most notably the Armenian Revolutionary Federation were categorically against the signing of the protocols, given the recognition of the existing Turkish-Armenian border and the setting up of a joint commission of historians researching the Armenian Genocide, as envisioned by the protocols. They considered these steps as a sellout and staged mass protests against the signing of the protocols. The Armenian Diaspora was also largely opposed to this type of reconciliation with Turkey, arguing (despite Sargsyan's assurances to the contrary) that this would jeopardize the international recognition of the Armenian genocide as well as the prospects of legitimate territorial claims of Armenians from Turkey.

The process of reconciliation, however, was suspended after a year. In Armenia, before sending the protocols to the parliament, it was sent to the Constitutional Court to have their approval. The Constitutional Court made references to the preamble of the protocols underlying three main issues. One of them stated that the implementation of the protocols did not imply Armenia's official recognition of the existing Turkish-Armenian border established by the Treaty of Kars. By doing so, the Constitutional Court rejected one of the main premises of the protocols, i.e. "the mutual recognition of the existing border between the two countries as defined by relevant treaties of international law". This was regarded by the Turkish Government as effectively revising the protocols and thus the reason to back down from the process. As a consequence, the Turkish Parliament did not ratify the protocols. The Armenian side accused Turkey to tie the reconciliation process with the resolution of the Nagorno-Karabakh conflict, expecting concessions on the Armenian side, which was unacceptable for the latter. Sargsyan explained the suspension of the reconciliation process by the Armenian side in the following way:

For a whole year, Turkey's senior officials have not spared public statements in the language of preconditions. For a whole year, Turkey has done everything to protract time and fail the process... We consider unacceptable the pointless efforts of making the dialogue between Armenia and Turkey an end in itself; from this moment on, we consider the current phase of normalization exhausted."

Sargsyan however has also stated that unlike Ankara, Yerevan remains committed to its initiative to normalizing relations with Turkey.

==== European Union ====
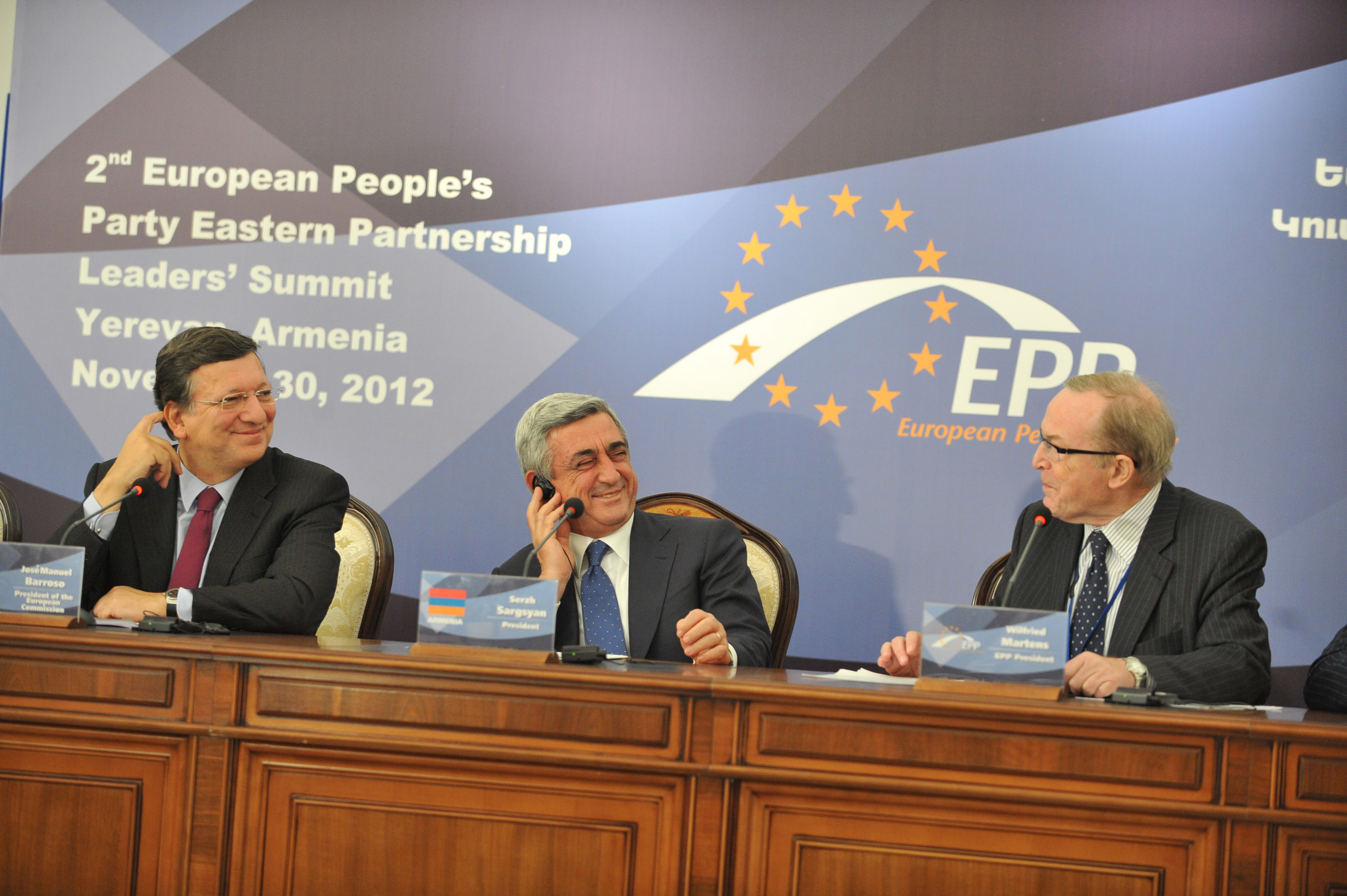
Sargsyan with President of the European Commission Jose Manuel Barroso and the President of the European People's Party Wilfried Martens at the European People's Party Eastern Partnership Leaders' Summit in Yerevan, 30 November 2012

President Sargsyan supported Armenia's efforts to ink an Association Agreement with the EU, which contains a Deep and Comprehensive Free Trade Area, for several years. Under his presidency, the negotiations for the agreement were completed and Armenia was set to sign the agreement at an upcoming EU Summit. However, President Sargsyan made a drastic policy reversal when in September 2013, after a meeting with President Vladimir Putin in Moscow, he opted to join the Russian-led Eurasian Economic Union. It was widely believed that Russian pressure and threats killed Armenia's deal with the EU. Even though such a reversal was made, President Sargsyan's administration was determined to further EU inspired reforms in law and governance, and this led to Armenia signing the Comprehensive and Enhanced Partnership Agreement with the European Union on 24 November 2017. Behind the scenes, Russia granted approval to Armenia to sign the deal after any economic provisions were removed from the deal.

=== Protests against Sargsyan's presidency ===
Major protests against Sargsyan's regime began in 2011, with the president's 2008 rival Levon Ter-Petrosyan at their helm. In a concession to protesters, Sargsyan said on 20 April 2011 that the government would recommit to a thorough investigation of the post-election violence of three years prior.

In July 2016, thousands of Armenians protested in the capital Yerevan in support of the "Daredevils of Sasun," an armed group that stormed police headquarters in Yerevan and took hostages while calling for the release of all political prisoners and the resignation of president Serzh Sargsyan. The National Security Service of Armenia called the takeover (which resulted in the deaths of three policemen) a terrorist attack, but a growing number of Armenians disagreed with that assessment.

== Prime Minister (2018) ==
Shortly after the end of his presidency on 9 April 2018, Sargsyan was elected Prime Minister of Armenia on 17 April. Opposition figures described this as a "power grab" and there were large-scale protests against him. On 22 April, Sargsyan held a three-minute televised meeting with opposition MP and leader of the protests Nikol Pashinyan. Sargsyan accused the opposition of delivering an ultimatum for his resignation instead of engaging in dialogue, and left the meeting early; Pashinyan was detained by police hours after the meeting. The continuing protests were eventually successful in pressuring Sargsyan. On 23 April, Pashinyan was released from detention and Sargsyan announced his resignation. Former Prime Minister Karen Karapetyan succeeded Sargsyan as acting Prime Minister. Armenia's National Assembly, still controlled by Sargsyan's Republican Party, elected Nikol Pashinyan Prime Minister on 8 May 2018.

== Criminal prosecution ==
Sargsyan has been under criminal prosecution within the scope of a criminal case on embezzlement. The Special Investigative Service of Armenia on 4 December 2019, has brought embezzlement charges against Sargsyan, particularly for the organization of the embezzlement of half a billion AMD within the scope of the state program on assisting farmers to obtain diesel fuel on affordable price in 2013. In January 2020, based on sufficient evidence collected, the Special Investigative Service has indicted Sargsyan for embezzlement on especially large scale (AMD ֏489,160,310) and the criminal case with the indictment has been handed to the prosecutor supervising the case for approval and sending it to court.

== Honours and awards ==
Serzh Sargsyan has thus far been conferred the following honors:

- Order of first Degree "Martakan Khach" ("Combat Cross") (Armenia, 1994)
- Hero of Artsakh (Republic of Artsakh, 2000)
- Order of "Voske Artsiv" (Golden Eagle) (Republic of Artsakh, 2000)
- Order of Tigran Mets (named after Tigranes the Great) (Armenia, 2006)
- Order of Honor (Georgia, 2010)
- Grand Cross of the Legion of Honour (France, 2011)
- The First Class of the Order of Prince Yaroslav the Wise (Ukraine, 2011)
- Order of the Republic of Serbia (2013)
- Presidential Order of Excellence (Georgia, 2013)
- National Order of Merit (France, 2014)
- Order of the Golden Fleece (Georgia)

== Personal life ==
In 1983, he married his wife, Rita Sargsyan née Dadayan, with whom he has two daughters, Anush and Satenik. They have two granddaughters, Mariam and Rita, and two grandsons, Ara and Serzh. Sargsyan is also the chairman of the Armenian Chess Federation. His wife Rita died on 20 November 2020, from COVID-19 at the age of 58.

Sargsyan has two younger brothers: Alexander (Sashik), a businessman and former member of Armenia's parliament, and Levon, a diplomat and professor at Yerevan State University.

=== Other details ===
Other transcriptions of his given name are Serge and Serj, of the surname Sarkissian, Sarkisyan, Sargsyan, Sarkissyan, the transliteration is Serž Azati Sargsyan (see Romanization of Armenian). His name during the Soviet era was Russified as Serzh Azatovich Sargsyan (Серж Аза́тович Саргся́н).

Political offices
Preceded by Andranik Margaryan	Prime Minister of Armenia; 2007–2008	Succeeded by Tigran Sargsyan
Preceded by Robert Kocharyan	President of Armenia; 2008–2018	Succeeded by Armen Sarkissian
Preceded by Karen Karapetyan; Acting	Prime Minister of Armenia; 2018	Succeeded by Karen Karapetyan; Acting
