= Armen Sarkissian =

President of Armenia from 2018 to 2022

- Արմեն Սարգսյան
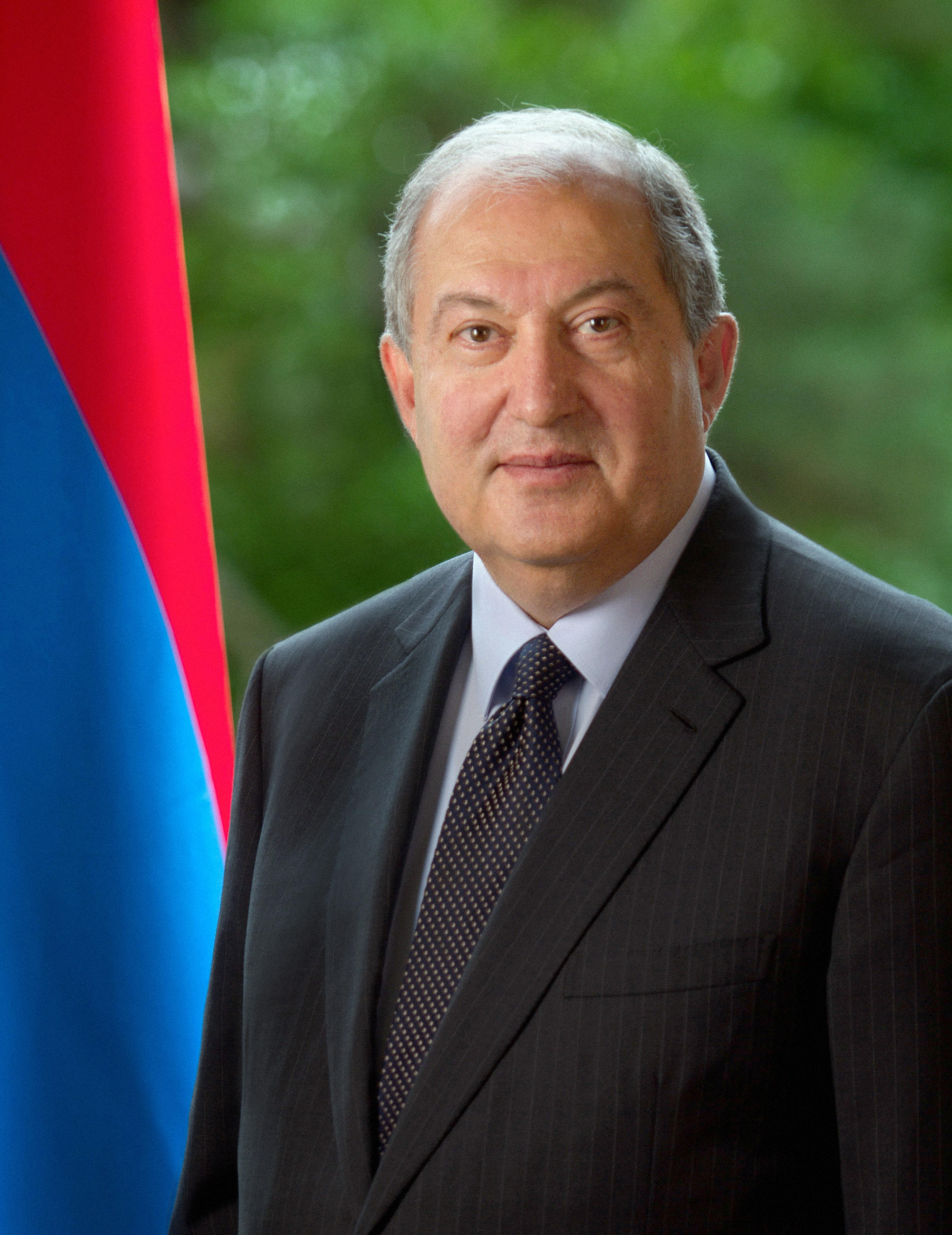
- Official portrait, 2018

4th President of Armenia
- In office 9 April 2018 – 1 February 2022
- Prime Minister: Karen Karapetyan (acting); Serzh Sargsyan; Karen Karapetyan (acting); Nikol Pashinyan
- Preceded by: Serzh Sargsyan
- Succeeded by: Alen Simonyan (acting); Vahagn Khachaturyan

5th Prime Minister of Armenia
- In office 4 November 1996 – 20 March 1997
- President: Levon Ter-Petrosyan
- Preceded by: Hrant Bagratyan
- Succeeded by: Robert Kocharyan

Personal details
- Born: 23 June 1953 (age 73) Yerevan, Armenian SSR, Soviet Union
- Party: Independent
- Spouse: Nouneh Sarkissian
- Children: 2
- Education: Yerevan State University
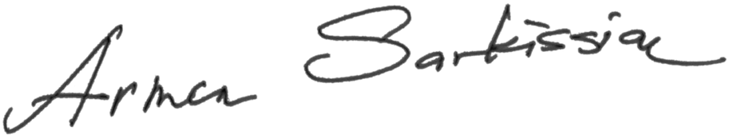
- Signature

Armen Vardani Sarkissian (Armenian: Արմեն Վարդանի Սարգսյան; (Note: The surname Armenian: Սարգսյան is normally transliterated as Sargsyan, but as director of Eurasia House, he used the spelling Armen Sarkissian, which is the French transcription of his name in Russian (Армен Саркисян). On former Soviet passports, the Russian names were usually romanized using a transcription system to French, then the common language in diplomacy.) born 23 June 1953) is an Armenian politician, physicist, investor, businessman, and computer scientist who was the 4th president of Armenia from 2018 to 2022. He also was Prime Minister of Armenia from 1996 to 1997. He was the first president of post-Soviet Armenia born in the former Armenian SSR.

Sarkissian has been one of the longest serving ambassadors of any country to the United Kingdom, a role to which he was first appointed in 1992-1996, before returning in 1998 and 2013. He was also Armenia's maiden ambassador to the Vatican, the European Union, NATO, the Netherlands, Luxembourg and Belgium, and served as "Senior Ambassador" to Europe.

Sarkissian served as the first chairman of the Global Council on Energy Security at the World Economic Forum, with which he has had a long association. He authored numerous scientific articles and was a speaker and commentator on international affairs. His op-eds and essays have appeared in publications such as the Times, the Financial Times, the Daily Telegraph, Time magazine, Newsweek, Hollywood Reporter and the Wall Street Journal.

Sarkissian released a book titled The Small States Club: How Small Smart States can Save the World, published by Hurst Publishers in 2023 following his resignation as president the year before. In January 2023, The Small States Club was listed alongside forthcoming books by Martin Wolf and Peter Frankopan as one of the "15 books to look forward to in 2023" by the Diplomatic Courier.

== Education and early career ==
Sarkissian graduated from the Yerevan State University Department of Theoretical Physics and Mathematics. He was an Honorary Doctor of the National Academy of Sciences of Armenia and member of the National Competitiveness Council of Armenia. From 1976 to 1984, he was assistant and later associate professor of Physics at Yerevan State University. In 1984, he became a visiting research fellow and visiting professor at the University of Cambridge. where he worked alongside Stephen Hawking and Lord Martin Rees.

In 1988, he established and subsequently became the Head of the Department of Computer Modeling of Complex Systems at Yerevan State University.

Sarkissian was one of the co-creators of the 1991 Tetris spinoff game Wordtris. Later packaged with Tetris as Tetris Gold, it was for a period the most popular videogame in the world by sales. In an article in The Hollywood Reporter in March 2023, Sarkissian detailed the "tense and dramatic events" surrounding the creation of Wordtris and its sale to Spectrum Holobyte. In April, he appeared on a podcast alongside Henk Rogers, the co-founder of The Tetris Company, and Alexey Pajitnov, the creator of the game, of whom he had last seen in the Soviet Union.

Before becoming president of Armenia from 2018 to 2022, Armen Sarkissian worked in science and technology, where his background included theoretical physics and co-creating the videogame Wordtris..

== Political, diplomatic, business career ==
In November 1991, Sarkissian established the Armenian Embassy in London, the first Armenian diplomatic mission in the West. In addition to his diplomatic mission in the UK, he went on to become Senior Ambassador to Europe, and ambassador to NATO, to Belgium and the Netherlands, Luxembourg and the Vatican. In 1995–96, he was the Head of Mission of Armenia to the European Union.

In 1996, Sarkissian was elected Prime Minister of Armenia. In his short tenure, he initiated significant economic and political changes, including the abolition of the Ministry of Information, which paved the way for press freedom for the first time since Armenia's independence in 1992. He also presided over a restructuring of Armenia's energy sector, which had suffered serious setbacks during the war with Azerbaijan, and oversaw reforms in the government and civil service. Sarkissian resigned in 1997 after being diagnosed with cancer and was succeeded by Robert Kocharyan.

Following his recovery, Sarkissian was appointed as Special Advisor to the President of the European Bank for Reconstruction and Development (EBRD) and as a Governor of EBRD from 1998 to 2000. Sarkissian also built a lucrative private career as a consultant and business adviser to some of the world's biggest multinationals.

Sarkissian was also one of the directors of Eurasia House International, a Vice Chairman of the EastWest Institute in New York, and the Founding Director of the Eurasia Centre at Cambridge University's Judge Business School (2001-2011). Sarkissian has held various honorary and executive positions, including as a Member of Dean's Advisory Board at Harvard Kennedy School, Dean's Advisory Board at Harris School of Public Policy Studies at the University of Chicago, Member of the Board of Trustees of the International School in Dilijan, Member of the Euro-Atlantic Security Initiative, Member of International Research & Exchanges Board (IREX), Member of the Global Leadership Foundation and Member of the International Economic Alliance and Global Leadership Foundation. Sarkissian's focus in these roles has often involved supporting democratic leadership, preventing and resolving conflict through mediation, and prompting good governance in the form of democratic institutions, open markets, human rights and the rule of law.

Sarkissian is a trustee of the Armenian General Benevolent Union, the largest Armenian charity worldwide based in New York. He was an Honorary Senior Research Fellow at the School of Mathematical Sciences at Queen Mary University of London.

== President of Armenia ==
=== Election ===
President Serzh Sargsyan offered the presidency to Sarkissian on an official television broadcast on 19 January 2018 with a public request to shoulder responsibility in enhancing Armenia's foreign relations, diaspora affairs, foreign investment, science, education and culture. Sarkissian's candidacy was supported by the ruling Republican Party. He also enjoyed additional support from the ARF bloc, as well as from the Tsarukian Parliamentary bloc.

Sarkissian was elected president by a majority of the National Assembly on 2 March 2018, winning 90 votes in a 105-member House.

=== Inauguration ===
Sarkissian was inaugurated on 9 April 2018. The ceremony took place at the Karen Demirchyan Complex in Yerevan. Following the ceremony, the newly elected 4th President of Armenia visited the Yerablur military pantheon.

=== Presidency ===
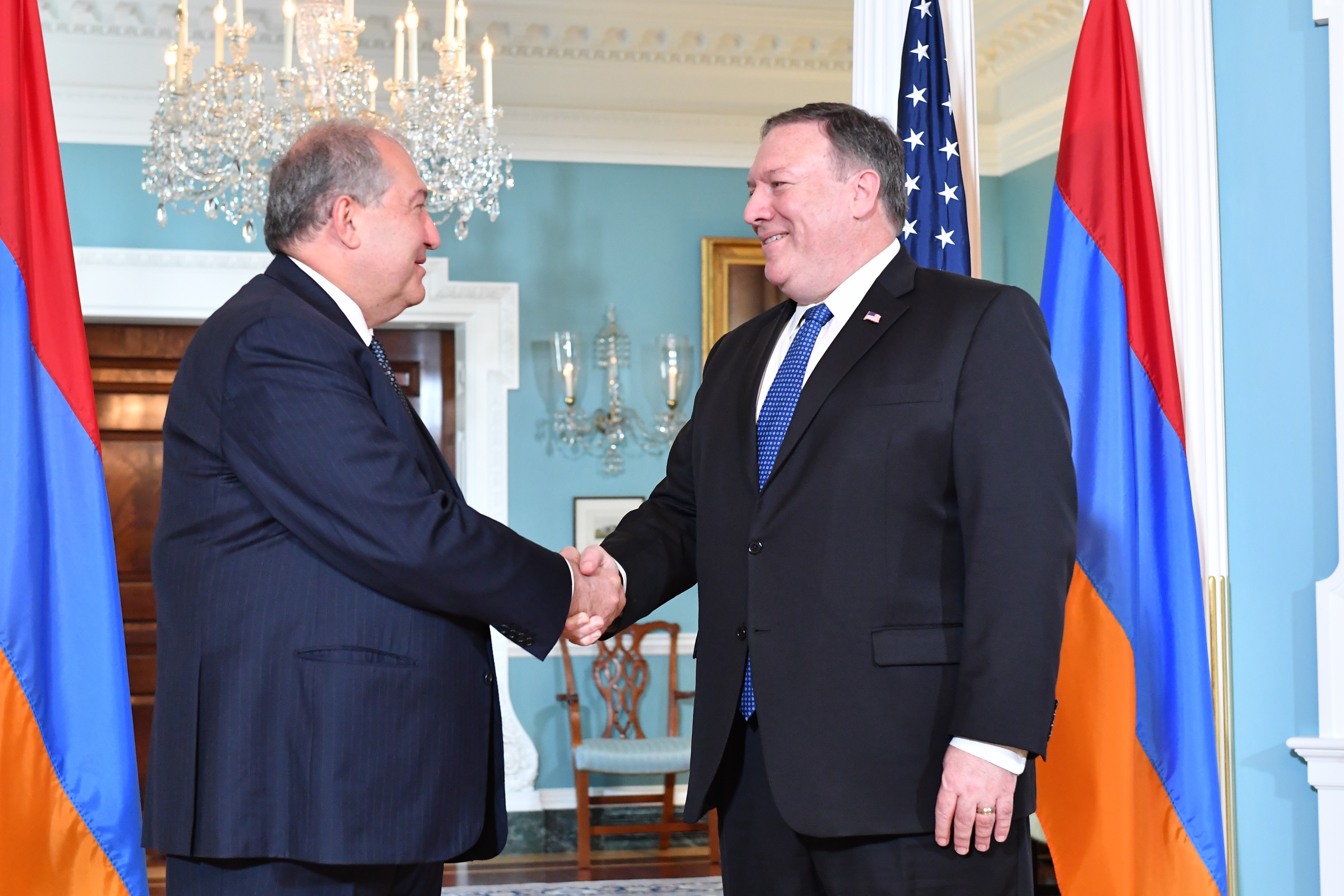
Sarkissian meets with U.S. Secretary of State Mike Pompeo in 2018.

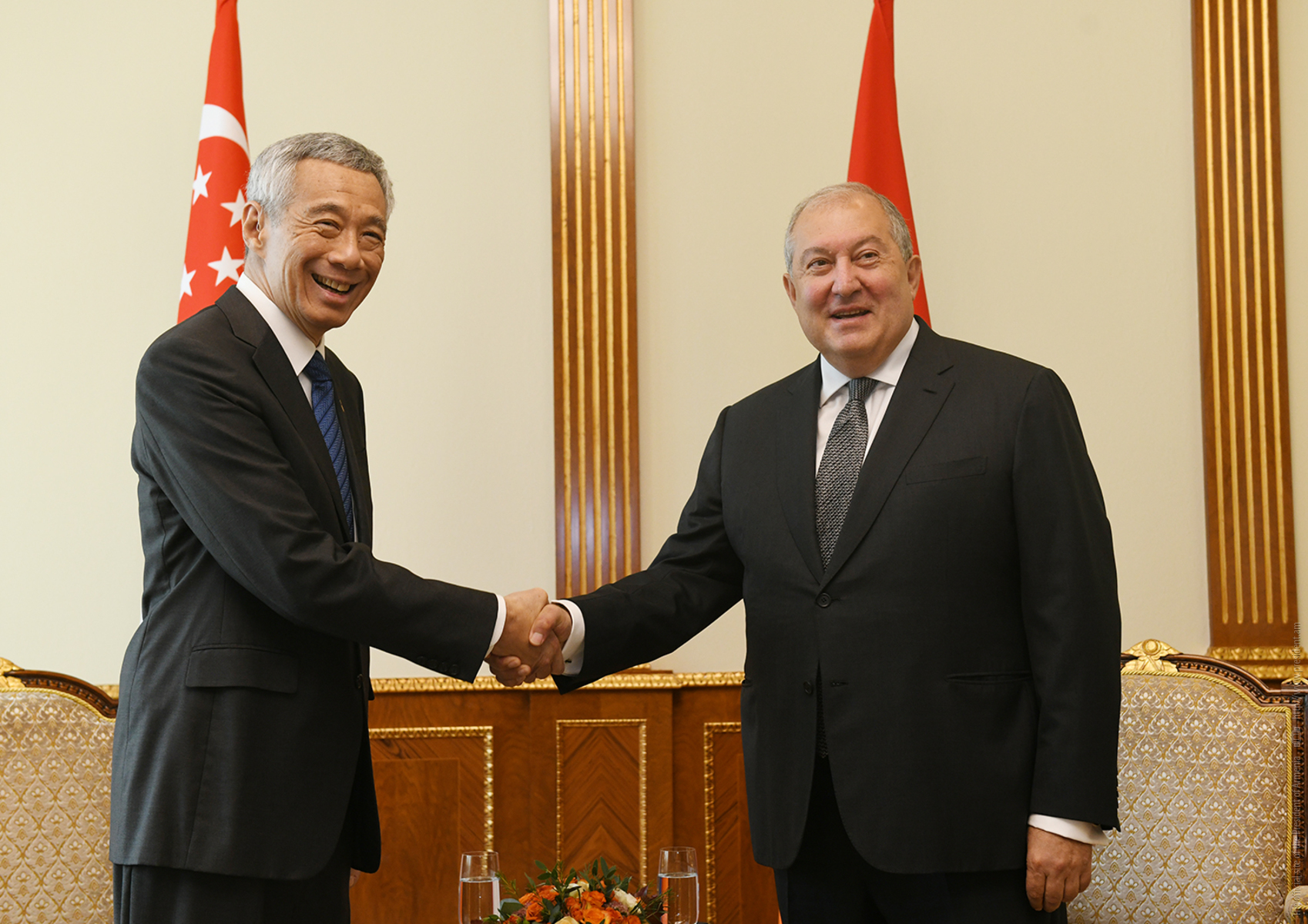
Sarkissian and Prime Minister of Singapore Lee Hsien Loong on 29 September 2019

On inauguration day, the government led by Karen Karapetyan resigned and parties in the National Assembly had a week to put forward their proposals for prime minister. Former president Serzh Sargsyan was unanimously nominated by the members of ruling parties in the National Assembly on 16 April, and was confirmed as prime minister on 17 April. However, Sargysyan's election as prime minister was met by large-scale protests, known as The Velvet Revolution.

Armen Sarkissian is credited with playing a pivotal role in finding a peaceful solution, threatening to resign if there was any use of violence. He attained international attention when he walked into the crowds without security escort and interacted with the protesters. An extensive profile of Sarkissian in the British magazine Spectator later observer that, "The Velvet Revolution was not preordained to be peaceful. It was Sarkissian's intervention that kept the peace."

Serzh Sargysyan resigned six days after taking the office. Karapetyan was subsequently appointed to serve as acting prime minister. On 8 May 2018, Nikol Pashinyan was elected prime minister by the National Assembly in a 59–42 vote.

Sarkissian visited Tbilisi on 26 May 2018 in his first official foreign visit to participate in the centennial celebrations of the founding of the Democratic Republic of Georgia. During his visit, he held talks with his Georgian counterpart Giorgi Margvelashvili as well as held meetings with Bidzina Ivanishvili and Salome Zourabichvili.

In June 2018, Sarkissian proposed changes to the constitution to balance the President's power with the Prime Minister's power. On the eve of the centennial anniversary of the end to First World War, Sarkissian told the Schweizer Radio und Fernsehen in an interview said that he would say the following to Turkish President Recep Tayyip Erdoğan in regards to the Armenian genocide:

"First, I would tell him good morning Mr. President, I think we have an issue to discuss together. You are the President of Turkey and I am the President of Armenia. My family, my grandparents are from Erzrum, Van and Bitlis and there is a history behind my own family. Why not start talking about the relations between Turkey and Armenia? Why not speak about our individual stories?"

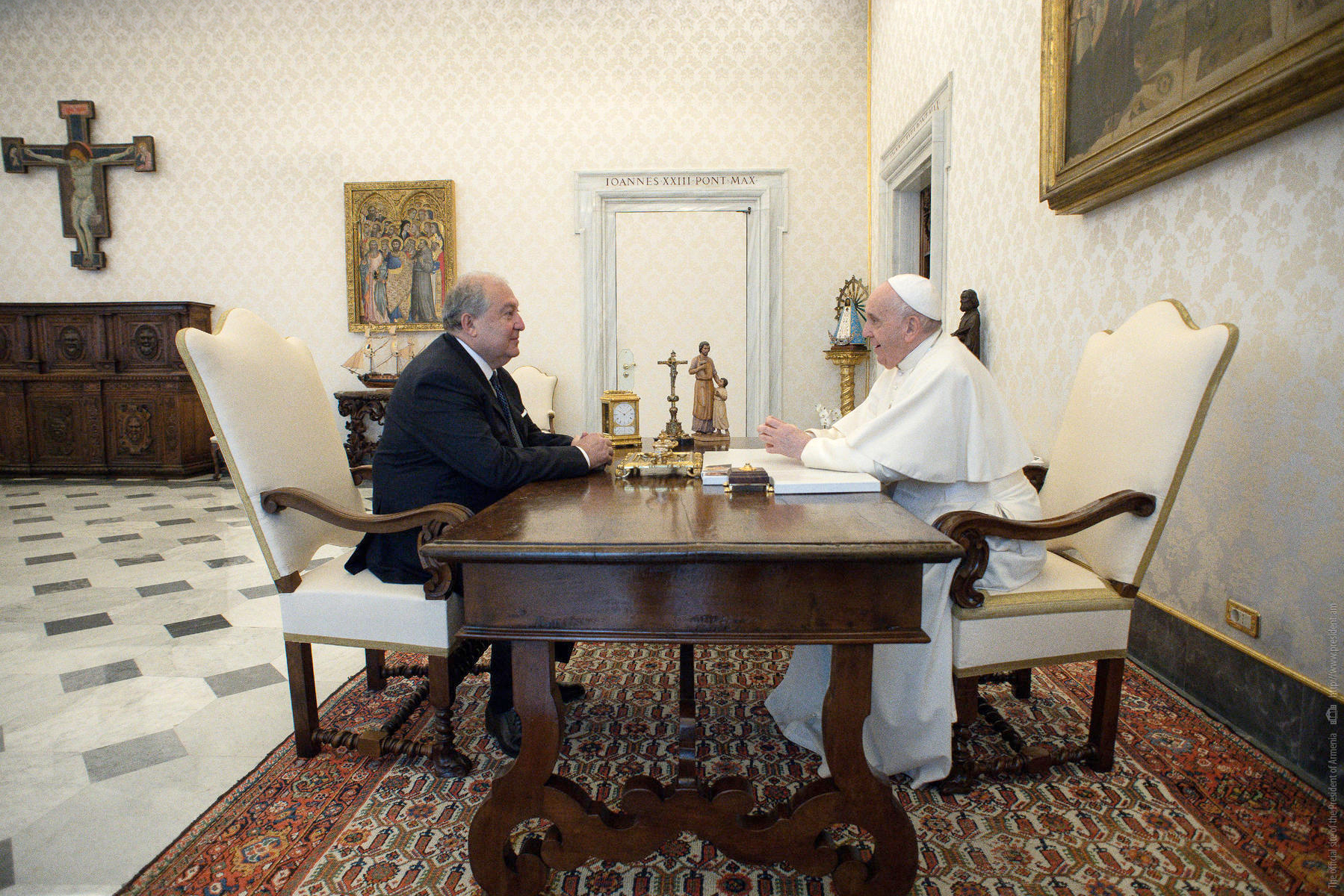
Pope Francis receives Armenian President Armen Sarkissian on 11 October 2021

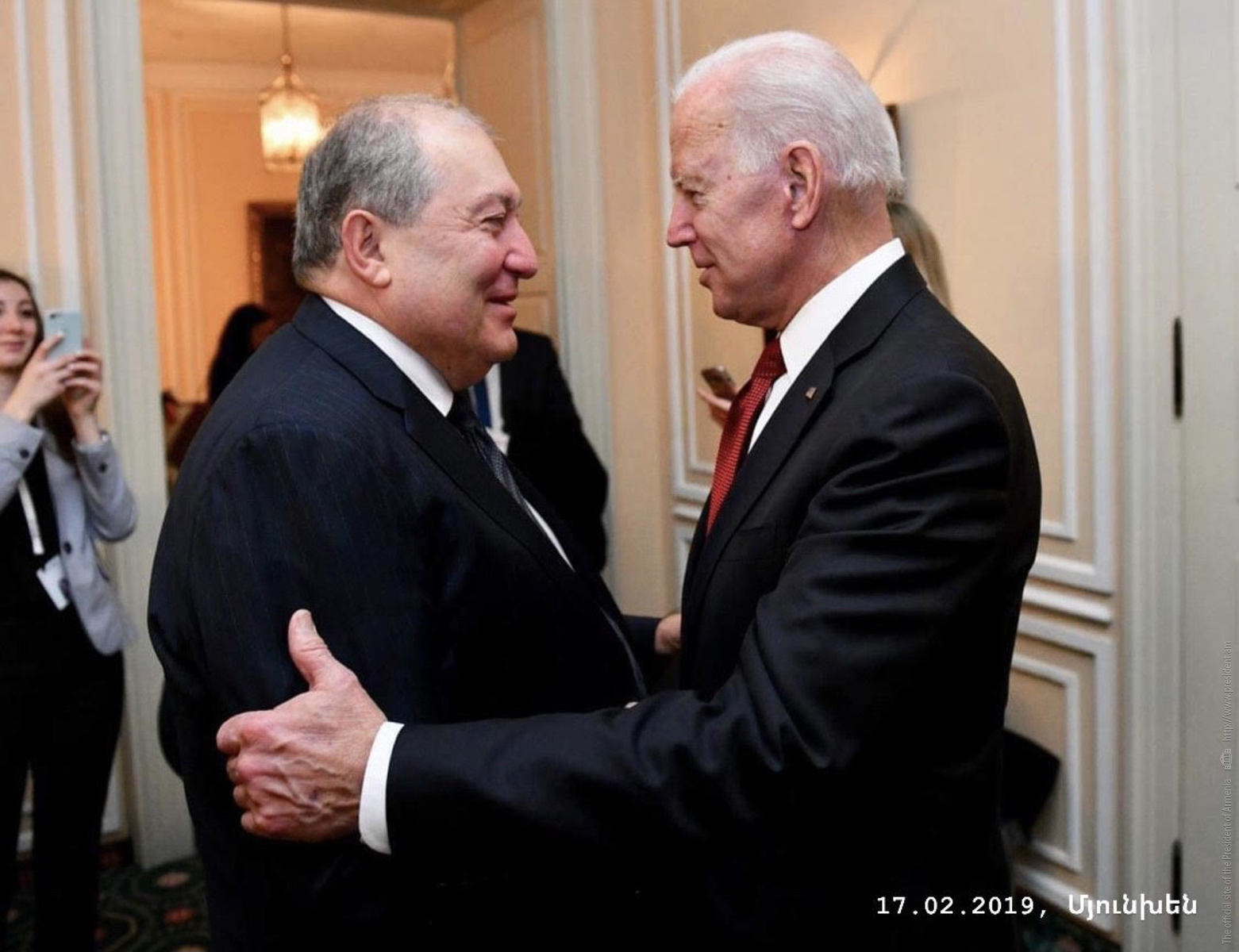
Armenian President Armen Sarkissian congratulated Joe Biden on his inauguration as the 46th President of the United States of America on 17 February 2019.

While visiting the Kazakhstani city of Almaty in May 2019, he said that his country could become an "international financial center" and can become a "cooperation bridge between Eurasia and EU". He said his remarks at the 15th annual Eurasian Media Forum, of which he was a co-founder.

In 2018, Sarkissian founded the Armenian chapter of the international Summit of Minds in the spa town of Dilijan. The annual summits drew various heads of state, industrialists, bankers, investors and thinkers to Armenia.

During the 44-day-war in Nagorno-Karabakh, Sarkissian was described by foreign observers of Armenia as the country's strongest diplomatic asset. But due to the limits placed on his office by the Constitution, he was not allowed to play a role in the management of the war or the subsequent diplomatic negotiations. This was seen as a major factor in his subsequent decision to step down.

In October 2021, Sarkissian made a historic visit to Saudi Arabia, becoming the first Armenian official to visit the kingdom. Since Armenia and Saudi Arabia do not have diplomatic relations, the visit was groundbreaking. Sarkissian was said to have used his personal relationships to make it happen. He was received by Crown Prince Mohammed bin Salman.

Sarkissian was also subject of often lurid conspiracy theories in some sections of the Armenian press, which routinely accused him of being a British spy, adducing as evidence for the allegations his friendships with British politicians and the then-Prince of Wales (now Charles III, who visited Armenia as a private guest of Sarkissian's in 2013.

Sarkissian had long expressed frustration with the constraints on the presidency and the government's refusal to honour its pledge to reform the Constitution. He had hinted to the British magazine The Spectator that he would resign if the Constitution remained unchanged, saying "I did not accept this job to feel honoured. I accepted it to serve Armenia. And I will not stay in it a second longer if it means impeding Armenia's progress."

In January 2022, Sarkissian resigned as President, issuing a strongly-worded statement in which he called attention to Armenia's "paradoxical situation, where the President performs the functions of the guarantor of statehood having no real tools" and described the country as a "parliamentary republic in shape, but not in content". Sarkissian said Armenians were being forced to live:

In a peculiar reality where the President cannot influence issues related to war and peace. In a reality where he cannot veto those bills that he considers inappropriate for the state and people. In a reality where the President's capabilities are not perceived as an advantage for the state but are viewed as a threat to various political groups. In a reality where the President cannot use a crucial part of his potential to solve systemic domestic and foreign policy issues. In a reality where the world appears to be a zone of constant turbulence and the President does not have the constitutional tools to help his country. In a reality where the head of state and sometimes even his family become targets for attacks by various political groups… I thought it thoroughly and decided to resign as the President of the Republic of Armenia after almost four years of active work. This step of mine is entirely non-emotional and comes from a certain logic. In the current challenging period for the state and the nation, the President does not have the necessary tools to influence the fundamental processes in domestic and foreign policy.

Days after Sarkissian's resignation and the publication of the real reasons of his resignation (see above), the Organised Crime and Corruption Reporting Project alleged that Sarkissian possessed a St. Kitts and Nevis passport. Under Armenian law, the president is not allowed to hold dual citizenship. Sarkissian denied that his decision was connected with the OCCRP report, which was published after he had left office. He explained that he had made a historic investment of $500,000 in a luxury hotel in St. Kitts and Nevis, which has conferred citizenship on foreign investors under a "citizenship-by-investment" programme since 1984. Sarkissian clarified that he had renounced his right to citizenship under the programme.

Sarkissian had long been the target of frenzied speculation and allegations, including the claim that he had not disclosed his private wealth and that he was actively engaged as director in an overseas company while serving as President. Following a lengthy investigation that lasted more than a year after Sarkissian's resignation, the Corruption Prevention Commission of Armenia found the allegations to be baseless. It also noted that Sarkissian had in fact made a full disclosure of all his private income.

In the early stages of the 2020 Nagorno-Karabakh conflict, Sarkissian gave numerous interviews to international news organizations during which he appealed for action against the Government of Turkey and the actions of the Azerbaijani Armed Forces, telling CNBC's Hadley Gamble to "Imagine Caucasus becoming another Syria?" In another interview to the German Bild tabloid, he compared the situation in Stepanakert to German towns during World War II.

After the ceasefire agreement was signed in early November, Sarkissian held a meeting with Karekin II, where they both made a call to declare 22 November as the Day of Remembrance of the Heroes who fell for the Defense of the Motherland in the Artsakh Liberation War.

On 10 November, as Armenia was gripped by protests against the prime minister, Sarkissian publicly called for Pashinyan's resignation. On 16 November, in an address to the nation, he concluded that snap parliamentary elections were essential in light of the protests, proposing the creation of an interim "National Accord Government" to oversee the process of stabilising the country and holding fresh elections. In early 2021, he called for the creation of a "Fourth Republic".

=== Official visits hosted by Sarkissian ===
Country	Dates	Leader	Notes
Italy	30 July 2018	President Sergio Mattarella	He awarded Sarkissian with the Order of Merit of the Italian Republic
Germany	24 August 2018	Chancellor Angela Merkel	
Georgia	13 March 2019	President Salome Zurabishvili	
Greece	5 November 2019	President Prokopis Pavlopoulos	
Jordan	11–13 February 2020	King Abdullah II	
France	October 2020	President Emmanuel Macron	
Italy	October 2020	President Sergio Mattarella	

== Personal life ==
He married Nouneh Sarkissian (born 1954), a researcher at the Matenadaran, in 1978. Together, they have two adult children. Besides Armenian and Russian, two languages that Sarkissian grew up speaking, he was also fluent in English as a result of his time spent in the United Kingdom. He was a personal friend of Charles III, who (as Prince of Wales) made a private visit to Armenia in 2013 as Sarkissian's guest. He also knew the Soviet intelligence officer Gevork Vartanian. and sought his help to build Armenia's intelligence capabilities.

In January 2021, Sarkissian tested positive for the COVID-19 while on a visit to London. He was shifted to a hospital and returned to Armenia following his recovery.

== Awards ==
Domestic

- In 2017, Sarkissian was awarded the first degree medal For Services to Homeland Armenia
- In 2008, Sarkissian received the St. Gregory the Illuminator medal from Garegin II, Catholicos of All Armenians.
- In 1997, Sarkissian received the St. Gregory the Great Order from Pope John Paul II

Foreign

- In 2021, Sarkissian was awarded the highest order of the Holy See, the Grand Collar of the Papal Order of Pius IX
- (Italy) In 2018, Sarkissian was awarded the highest Italian award - Knight of the Grand Cross Order of Merit of the Italian Republic
- John Edwin Mroz Global Statesman Award (EastWest Institute, 2018)

== Notes ==
Political offices
Preceded by Hrant Bagratyan	Prime Minister of Armenia; 1996–1997	Succeeded by Robert Kocharyan
Preceded by Serzh Sargsyan	President of Armenia; 2018–2022	Succeeded by Alen Simonyan; Acting
