= President of Armenia =

Head of state

- Հայաստանի նախագահ (Armenian)
- Presidential emblem

- Presidential standard

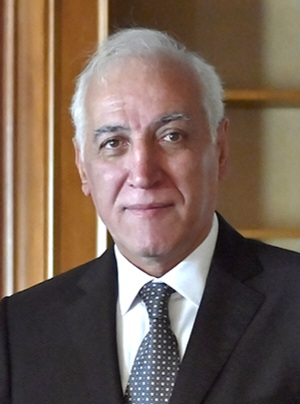
- Incumbent; Vahagn Khachaturyan since 13 March 2022
- Office of the President of Armenia
- Style: Mr. President (formal); His Excellency (diplomatic, abroad)
- Type: Head of state
- Residence: Presidential Palace
- Seat: Yerevan
- Appointer: National Assembly
- Term length: Seven years; non renewable
- Constituting instrument: Constitution of Armenia (1995)
- Precursor: Chairman of the Supreme Council of Armenia
- Formation: 11 November 1991; 35 years ago
- First holder: Levon Ter-Petrosyan
- Deputy: President of the National Assembly
- Salary: ֏ 15,873,600 annually
- Website: president.am

The president of Armenia (Armenian: Հայաստանի Նախագահ, romanized: Hayastani Nakhagah) is the head of state and the guarantor of independence and territorial integrity of Armenia elected to a single seven-year term by the National Assembly of Armenia. Under Armenia's parliamentary system, the president is simply a figurehead and holds ceremonial duties, with most of the political power vested in the parliament and prime minister.

Vahagn Khachaturyan has been serving as president since 13 March 2022.

== Background ==
The president of the republic strives to uphold the constitution, and to ensure the regular functioning of the executive and judicial powers. They are the guarantor of the independence, territorial integrity and security of the republic. The president of the republic is immune: they cannot be prosecuted or held liable for actions arising from their status during and after their term of office. For the actions not connected with their status the president of the Republic may be prosecuted when their term of office expires.

According to Article 60 of the Constitution of Armenia, in case when the office of the president of the republic is vacant and before the newly elected president assumes the office, the chairman of the National Assembly, or, if it is impossible, the prime minister performs the duties of the president.

=== Post-foundation history ===
The post of the president of Armenia was founded by the decision of Armenian SSR Supreme Council of 3 May 1990.

On 21 June 1991, RA Supreme Council made a decision which determined that an election based on the common and equal electoral rights of the citizens of RA would take place before 31 December of 1991. On the basis of RA Supreme Council's decision of 25 June 1991, the elections of the president of the Republic of Armenia were scheduled to be held on Wednesday, 16 October 1991.

Armenia became an independent state on 21 September 1991 after the independence referendum earlier that year. The first presidential election was held on 17 October 1991. Levon Ter-Petrosyan won the majority of the votes and became the first president of independent Armenia. He was re-elected in 1996; however, he did not finish his second term as president and resigned in 1998. Robert Kocharyan followed him in the office until 2008. President Serzh Sargsyan was elected in February 2008 and re-elected in February 2013 for a second term until 2018. Armen Sarkissian replaced him as president on 9 April 2018, and he was in turn replaced by the current office holder Vahagn Khachaturyan on 13 March 2022.

== Election process ==
=== Election process until constitutional changes in 2015 ===
The elections of the president are held according to the procedures defined by the Constitution and the law. The president of the republic used to be elected by the citizens of the Republic of Armenia for a five-year term of office. Every person having attained the age of thirty-five, having been a citizen of the Republic of Armenia for the preceding ten years, having permanently resided in the Republic for the preceding ten years, and having the right to vote was eligible to be elected as president of the republic. The same person could not be elected for the post of the president of the republic for more than two consecutive terms. The election of the president of the republic was held fifty days prior to the expiration of their term of office according to the procedure defined by the Constitution and the law. The candidate who had received more than half of the votes is elected president of the republic.

If the election involves more than two candidates and none of them receives the required number of votes, a second round of election is held on the fourteenth day following the voting. The two candidates having received the highest number of votes may participate in the second round of election of the president of the republic. In the second round the candidate who receives the highest number of votes is elected president of the republic. If only one candidate runs for the election, they can be elected if they receive more than half of the votes of electors participated in the polls. If the president of the republic is not elected, a new election is appointed and the voting is held on the fortieth day following the date of appointment of the new election. The president of the republic takes office on the day when the term of office of the previous president expires. If the president of the republic is elected by new or extraordinary elections, they shall take office on the twentieth day following the elections.

In case if insuperable obstacles for one of the candidates arise, the elections of the president of the republic should be held off for two weeks. In case if the insuperable obstacles are not removed, new elections should be held upon end of the two-week term, on the fortieth day. In case of decease of one of the candidates before the elections day, new elections are held, and the voting takes place on the fortieth day after the appointment of the new election day.

If the president of the republic resigns, dies, is incapable to perform their duties or is removed from office extraordinary elections are held on the fortieth day following the vacancy of the office of the president. During martial law or state emergency election of the president should not be held and the president in this case continues their responsibilities. The new election of the President of Republic is held fortieth day after the expiration of the term of the martial law or state of emergency

=== Oath ===
The president of the republic assumes their duties as stated in the law. In National Assembly's special session the President should swear the following oath to the people "Assuming the office of the President of the Republic of Armenia I swear to fulfill the requirements of the Constitution in an unreserved manner, to respect fundamental human and civil rights and freedoms, to ensure the protection, independence, territorial integrity and security of the Republic to the glory of the Republic of Armenia and to the welfare of the people of the Republic of Armenia".

== Constitutional powers and duties ==
The powers of President of Armenia are determined by the Constitution. The president is the one to ensure the regular functioning of the Executive, Legislative and Judicial powers of the Republic of Armenia. They do not directly control any of those branches, but they hold the power to interfere in their actions.

=== Roles in the executive branch ===
According to Article 1 of the Law on the President of the Republic of Armenia adopted on 1 August 1991, the president is the head of the executive branch.

==== Government formation ====
The president appoints as prime minister the person enjoying the confidence of the majority of the deputies. This is done on the basis of the distribution of the seats in the National Assembly and consultations held with the parliamentary factions. If the appointment of the prime minister according to the above-mentioned procedures is impossible, the president of the Republic can appoint as the prime minister the person enjoying the confidence of the maximum number of the deputies. The Government is formed within 20 days after the appointment of the Prime Minister. Upon the recommendation of the prime minister, the president of the Republic can appoint and dismiss from office the members of the Government. They also may appoint one of the ministers as a deputy prime minister, with the suggestion of the prime minister. President appoints state office positions, forms and presides over Security Council, and may establish other advisory bodies if necessary.

==== Government operations ====
The procedure for the organization of operations of the Government and other public administration bodies under the Government are defined by the decree of the president. The president may cancel the action of governmental decision for one month and apply to Constitutional Court to deal with the problem. The president is the one who validates decisions of the government about appointing and rejecting governors. Governmental sessions on issues connected to external policy and national security are also initiated by the president. According to Article 111 of the constitution the president is the one who can call a referendum to make amendments in the Constitution of the Republic of Armenia

==== Government resignation ====
The president of the Republic accepts the resignation of the Government only in one of the following days/cases:

1. When the first sitting of the newly elected National Assembly is held
2. When the President of the Republic assumes office
3. When the National Assembly expresses no confidence in the Government
4. When the National Assembly does not give an approval to the Program of the Government.
5. When the Prime Minister resigns or when the office of Prime Minister remains vacant

After the acceptance of the resignation of the Government by the president of the Republic the members of the Government continue performing their responsibilities until the new Government is formed.

=== Roles in the legislative branch ===
The president of the republic signs and promulgates the laws passed by the National Assembly. Within the period of twenty-one days they may remand the law passed by the National Assembly and return it in form of a letter, where they note their objections and recommendations and requests new deliberations on the issue. After the recommendations and objections of the president are considered, they should, within five days, sign and promulgate the law readopted by the National Assembly. The president has the power to dissolve National Assembly and hold extraordinary elections if the National Assembly does not give an approval to the program of the Government two times in succession within two months. The president of Republic may also dissolve the National Assembly upon the recommendation of the chairman of the National Assembly or the prime minister in the following cases:

1. If the National Assembly fails within three months to resolve on the draft law that was considered to be urgent by the decision of the Government;
2. If in the course of a regular session no sittings of the National Assembly are convened within three months;
3. If in the course of a regular session the National Assembly fails, for more than three months, to adopt a resolution on issues under consideration.

The president of the Republic also has the power to:

- Put a veto on the decision of the National Assembly to adopt a law;
- Initiate the amendment of the constitution.

==== Legal acts issued by the President ====
According to the Law on Legal acts, the president of the Republic of Armenia may adopt only regulatory or individual decrees or executive orders. Decrees and orders issued by the president cannot contradict the Constitution and laws of the Republic of Armenia and are subject to implementation throughout the territory of the Republic.

=== Roles in the judicial branch ===
The president of the Republic of Armenia appoints 4 members of the Constitutional Court and, if the National Assembly fails to appoint the president of the Constitutional Court in the period prescribed in Article 83 Clause 1 of the Constitution, appoints the president of the Constitutional Court from among the members of the Constitutional Court.

They may, on the basis of a conclusion of the Constitutional Court terminate the powers of any of their appointees in the Constitutional Court or give their consent to involve the member as an accused, detain them, or authorize to institute a court proceeding to subject them to administrative liability. Upon the recommendation of the Council of Justice, the president appoints the presidents and the judges of the Court of Cassation and its chambers, the Court of Appeal, First Instance Court and specialized courts.

The president appoints two legal scholars as members of the Council of Justice. They can also grant pardon to convicted persons and suggest the National Assembly to declare an amnesty.

== Termination of powers ==
The President's powers are suspended if they resign, die, are incapable to perform their duties or are removed from office. The President of the Republic submits their resignation to the National Assembly.

=== Impeachment ===
The president may be impeached for treason or other grave crimes. In order to obtain a conclusion on impeaching the president of the Republic, the National Assembly appeals to the Constitutional Court by a resolution adopted by the majority of the total number of deputies. The resolution to remove the president of the Republic from office is passed by the National Assembly by a two-thirds majority vote of the total number of deputies, based on the conclusion of the Constitutional Court. If the Constitutional Court concludes that there are no grounds for impeaching the president of the Republic the impeachment is removed from the agenda of the National Assembly.

=== Health issues ===
In case of serious illness of the president of the Republic or other insurmountable obstacles which make it impossible for the President to perform their responsibilities, the National Assembly, upon the recommendation of the Government, the conclusion of the Constitutional Court and with a minimum of two-thirds majority vote of the total number of its members, adopts a decision that states the incapacity of the president of the Republic to discharge their powers. If the Constitutional Court concludes that there are reasons for the incapacity of the president of the Republic to discharge their responsibilities, the Government cannot apply to the National Assembly with such an issue.

== Official residence ==
The official residence of the president of Armenia is located at Baghramyan Avenue 26 in Yerevan. Since 2018, the Honour Guard Company of the Ministry of Defense performs public duties at the residence, the gates of which are usually open to visitors on weekends and for a short period on weekdays.

== Office of the President ==
=== Press Service ===
The following have served as Press Secretary to the President:

- Ruben Shugaryan (1992–1993)
- Aram Abrahamyan (1993–1995)
- Levon Zurabyan (1995–1995)
- Kasia Abgaryan (1998–1999)
- Vahe Gabrielyan (1999–2003)
- Ashot Kocharyan (2003–2005)
- Viktor Soghomonyan (2005–2008)
- Samvel Farmanyan (2008–2010)
- Armen Arzumanyan (2010–2013)
- Arman Saghatelyan (2013–2015)
- Vladimir Hakobyan (since 2015)

== List of officeholders ==
No.	Name (Birth–Death)	Portrait	Elected	Took office	Left office	Time in office	Office powers	Party
1	Levon Ter-Petrosyan (born 1945)		1991	11 November 1991	11 November 1996	6 years, 84 days	Head of Executive	Pan-Armenian National Movement
1	Levon Ter-Petrosyan (born 1945)		1996	11 November 1996	3 February 1998 (Resigned)	6 years, 84 days	Head of Executive	Pan-Armenian National Movement
2	Robert Kocharyan (born 1954)		—	3 February 1998	9 April 1998	10 years, 66 days	Head of Executive	Independent
2	Robert Kocharyan (born 1954)		1998	9 April 1998	9 April 2003	10 years, 66 days	Head of Executive	Independent
2	Robert Kocharyan (born 1954)		2003	9 April 2003	9 April 2008	10 years, 66 days	Head of Executive	Independent
3	Serzh Sargsyan (born 1954)		2008	9 April 2008	9 April 2013	10 years	Head of Executive	Republican Party
3	Serzh Sargsyan (born 1954)		2013	9 April 2013	9 April 2018	10 years	Head of Executive	Republican Party
4	Armen Sarkissian (born 1953)		2018	9 April 2018	1 February 2022 (Resigned)	3 years, 298 days	State representation, Guarantor of Constitution	Independent
–	Alen Simonyan (born 1980)		—	1 February 2022	13 March 2022	40 days	State representation, Guarantor of Constitution	Civil Contract
5	Vahagn Khachaturyan (born 1959)		2022	13 March 2022	Incumbent	4 years, 247 days	State representation, Guarantor of Constitution	Independent

=== Election results ===
Presidential elections were held on 2 March 2018, and per the constitutional reforms implemented by the ruling party, it was the first time in Armenia's history when the president was elected by the National Assembly instead of a popular vote.

Candidate	First round	
Candidate	Votes	%
Armen Sarkissian	90	85.71
Invalid/blank votes	1	0.95
Abstentions	10	9.52
Total	101	96.19
Eligible Voters	105	100
Source: Reuters

Following the resignation of Armen Sarkissian in January 2022, the ruling Civil Contract Party nominated Vahagn Khachaturyan for the presidency. He was elected president by the Armenian parliament in the second round of voting. He was inaugurated on 13 March 2022.

=== Timeline ===
This is a graphical lifespan timeline of the presidents of Armenia. They are listed in order of first assuming office.

The following chart lists presidents by lifespan (living presidents on the green line), with the years outside of their presidency in beige.

The following chart shows presidents by their age (living presidents in green), with the years of their presidency in blue. The vertical black line at 35 years indicates the minimum age to be president.

== Presidential awards ==
The president of Armenia grants the following awards.

- RA Presidential Award
- RA Presidential Youth Award in the area of Classical Music
- RA Presidential Youth Award
- RA Presidential Award for Considerable Contribution to the Process of Recognition of the Armenian Genocide
- Global Award of the President of the Republic of Armenia for Outstanding Contribution to Humanity through IT (Global IT Award)
- Educational Awards of the President of the Republic of Armenia in the Sphere of Information Technologies

== See also ==
- Deputy Prime Minister of Armenia
- List of leaders of Armenia
- President of the National Assembly of Armenia
- Prime Minister of Armenia
- Vice President of Armenia
