= Armenian calendar =

Today (at UTC+00)
- Sunday, 23 August 2026
- Armenian: 4 Hoṙi 1476
Other calendars
Aztec	Atemoztli 5, 5 Ācatl
Babylonian	9 Abu, 2337 SE
Balinese pawukon	Menga, Kajeng, Jaya, Paing, Urukung, Redite of Matal, Guru, Gigis, Sri
Bengali	8 Bhadro, BS 1433
Chinese	Yin Earth Snake・Room Mansion; 11 Qīyuè, Bǐngwǔnián (Chushu, 15 days until Bailu)
Common Era	23 August 2026 CE
Coptic	17 Mesori, AM 1742
Egyptian	9 Tybi, 2775 NE
Ethiopian	17 Naḥasē, 2018 Amätä Məhrät
French Republican	Décade I, Sextidi de Fructidor de l'Année 234 de la République
Gregorian	23 August, AD 2026
Hebrew	10 Elul, AM 5786
Hindu	5127 KY・1,872,810・Rāudra; Solar: 7 Bhādrapada, 1948 SE; Lunisolar: Ekādaśī, Śukla pakṣa of Śrāvaṇa, 2083 VE
Icelandic	Sunnudagur, 29 Heyannir 2026
Islamic	9 Rabi' al-awwal, AH 1448 (using tabular method)
ISO week date	2026-W34-7
Japanese	11 Fumizuki, Reiwa 8 (Shosho, 15 days until Hakuro)
Julian	10 August, AD 2026 (AM 7534)
Julian day	2461276
Maya	13.0.13.15.13; 6 Mol, 5 Ben
Roman	ante diem IV Idus Augustas, MMDCCLXXIX AUC
Solar Hijri	1 Shahrivar, SH 1405

The Armenian calendar is the calendar traditionally used by the Armenian people, and remains in use today for cultural and religious purposes. In 1918, the civil calendar in Armenia was changed to the Gregorian calendar.

In the Julian calendar year 352, tables compiled by Andreas of Byzantium were introduced in Armenia to determine the religious holidays. When those tables exhausted on 11 July 552 (Julian), the Armenian calendar was introduced. The epoch (Year 1) of the Armenian calendar began on 11 July 552. The calendar was adopted at the Second Council of Dvin.

An analytical expression of the Armenian date includes the ancient names of days of the week, Christian names of the days of the week, days of the month, Date/Month/Year number since the epoch, and the religious feasts. The Armenian calendar is divided into 12 months of 30 days each, plus an additional (epagomenal) five days, called aweleacʿ ("additional").

Years in the Armenian era are usually given in Armenian numerals (written in Armenian letters) preceded by the abbreviation Թ̅Վ̅, for t’vin (թուին, meaning "in the year"). For example, Թ̅Վ̅ ՌՆԾԵ, which means "the year 1455." Another prefix is Թ.Հ., standing for t’vin Hayocʿ (թուին Հայոց "in the Armenian year").

The Armenian calendar is based on an invariant year length of 365 days. Because a solar year is about 365.25 days and not 365 days, the correspondence between the Armenian calendar and both the solar year and the Julian calendar slowly drifted over time, shifting across a year of the Julian calendar once in 1,461 Armenian calendar years (see Sothic cycle). Thus, the Armenian year 1461 (Gregorian & Julian 2011) completed the first Sothic cycle since the epoch, and the Armenian calendar had gained one year. Armenian year 1462 (the first year of the second cycle) began on 11 July 2012 of the Julian calendar (24 July 2012 of the Gregorian calendar).

== Months ==
The Armenian month names show influence of the Zoroastrian calendar and Kartvelian influence in two cases (2nd and 3rd months). There are different systems for transliterating the names; the forms below are transliterated according to the Hübschmann-Meillet-Benveniste system:

Months of the year
#	Armenian	H-M Romaniz.	Meaning	Etymology/Notes
1	նաւասարդ	nawasard	new year	Avestan *nava sarəδa
2	հոռի	hoṙi	two	From Proto-Georgian–Zan, Georgian ori
3	սահմի	sahmi	three	From Proto-Georgian–Zan, Georgian sami
4	տրէ	trē		Zoroastrian Tïr
5	քաղոց	kʿałocʿ	month of crops	From Old Armenian քաղեմ (kʿałem) meaning "to gather" from PIE *kʷl̥-
6	արաց	aracʿ	harvest-time	From Old Armenian արաց (aracʿ), meaning harvest time, harvest of grape/fruit
7	մեհեկան	mehekan	festival of Mithra	Iranian *mihrakān-; Zoroastrian Mitrō
8	արեգ	areg	sun month	From Old Armenian արեւ (arew) meaning "sun" from PIE *h₂rew-i- also meaning sun
9	ահեկան	ahekan	fire festival	Iranian *āhrakān-; Zoroastrian Ātarō
10	մարերի	mareri	mid-year	Avestan maiδyaīrya; Zoroastrian Dīn
11	մարգաց	margacʿ		
12	հրոտից	hroticʿ		Pahlavi *fravartakān; Zoroastrian Spendarmat̰
13	աւելեաց	aweleacʿ	redundant, superfluous	Epagomenal days

== Days of the month ==
The Armenian calendar gives the days of the month names instead of numbering them – something also found in the Avestan calendars.

Zoroastrian influence is evident in five names:

Days of the month
#	Name	Armenian Text	Meaning/derivation
1	Areg	Արեգ	sun
2	Hrand	Հրանդ	earth mixed with fire
3	Aram	Արամ	
4	Margar	Մարգար	prophet
5	Ahrank’	Ահրանկ	half-burned
6	Mazdeł		
7	Astłik	Աստղիկ	Astłik
8	Mihr	Միհր	Mihr (Armenian deity)
9	Jopaber		tumultuous
10	Murc’	Մուրց	triumph
11	Erezhan		hermit
12	Ani	Անի	name of a city
13	Parkhar		
14	Vanat	Վանատ	host, refectioner of a monastery
15	Aramazd	Արամազդ	Aramazd
16	Mani	Մանի	beginning
17	Asak	Ասակ	beginningless
18	Masis	Մասիս	Mount Ararat
19	Anahit	Անահիտ	Anahit (Armenian goddess)
20	Aragats	Արագած	Mount Aragats
21	Gorgor		Name of a mountain
22	Kordvik		6th province in Armenia Major
23	Tsmak	Ծմակ	east wind
24	Lusnak	Լուսնակ	half-moon
25	Tsrōn		dispersion
26	Npat	Նպատ	Apam Napat
27	Vahagn	Վահագն	Zoroastrian Vahrām; Avestan Verethragna, name of the 20th day
28	Sim	Սիմ	mountain
29	Varag	Վարագ	name of a mountain
30	Gišeravar		evening star

== Holidays ==
Per Armenian law, 12 days are declared as non-working days. Non-working days include:

Date	English name	Local name	Remarks
1-2 January	New Year's Day	Ամանոր	Tradition
6 January	Christmas Day	Սուրբ Ծնունդ	Based on the calendar used in Armenian Apostolic Church
28 January	Army Day	Բանակի օր	In celebration of Armenian Army formation on that day in 1992
8 March	Women's Day	Կանանց տոն	Women's Day
24 April	Armenian Genocide Remembrance Day	Եղեռնի զոհերի հիշատակի օր	Remembrance of victims of Armenian genocide in 1915
1 May	Labour Day	Աշխատանքի օր	International Workers' Day
9 May	Victory and Peace Day	Հաղթանակի եւ Խաղաղության տոն	Shushi Liberation Day - on May 8, 1992 Armenian forces freed the city from Azerbaijani military forces, marking an important milestone in Artsakh liberation war for Armenians. Victory Day : 9 May (World War II) was a holiday throughout the USSR and is still an official holiday in Armenia.
28 May	Republic Day	Հանրապետության օր	Establishment of the Democratic Republic of Armenia in 1918
5 July	Constitution Day	Սահմանադրության օր	Adopted in 1995
21 September	Independence Day	Անկախության օր	Independence from the Soviet Union in 1991
31 December	New Year's Eve	Ամանոր	

== See also ==
- Public holidays in Armenia
- Armenian numerals
- Calendar of saints (Armenian Apostolic Church)
- Tabarian calendar
- Georgian calendar
- Iranian calendar
- Zoroastrian calendar
- hy:Հայկյան տոմար

== Literature ==
- V. Bănăţeanu, "Le calendrier arménien et les anciens noms des mois", in: Studia et Acta Orientalia 10, 1980, pp. 33–46
- Edouard Dulaurier, Recherches sur la chronologie arménienne technique et historique (1859), 2001 reprint ISBN 978-0-543-96647-6.
- Jost Gippert, Old Armenian and Caucasian Calendar Systems in The Annual of The Society for The Study of Caucasia", 1, 1989, 3-12.Jost Gippert: Old Armenian and Caucasian Calendar Systems [I]: Frame
- Louis H. Gray, On Certain Persian and Armenian Month-Names as Influenced by the Avesta Calendar, Journal of the American Oriental Society (1907)
- P'. Ingoroq'va, "Jvel-kartuli c'armartuli k'alendari" ("The Old Georgian pagan calendar"), in: Sakartvelos muzeumis moambe ("Messenger of the Museum of Georgia"), 6, 1929–30, pp. 373–446 and 7, 1931–32, pp. 260–336
- K'. K'ek'elije, "Jveli kartuli c'elic'adi" ("The Old Georgian year"), in: St'alinis saxelobis Tbilisis Saxelmc'ipo Universit'et'is šromebi ("Working papers of the Tbilisi State University by the name of Stalin") 18, 1941, reprinted in the author's "Et'iudebi jveli kartuli lit'erat'uris ist'oriidan" ("Studies in the history of Old Georgian literature") 1, 1956, pp. 99–124.
