= 2026 in Armenia =

- Decades: 2000s; 2010s; 2020s
- See also: Other events of 2026; List of years in Armenia

Events of the year 2026 in Armenia.

== Incumbents ==
- President: Vahagn Khachaturyan
- Prime Minister: Nikol Pashinyan
- Speaker: Alen Simonyan

== Events ==
=== February ===
- 9 February –
  - JD Vance arrives in Yerevan as the first US vice president to visit Armenia.
  - The United States and Armenia sign an agreement on civil nuclear cooperation.

=== May ===
- 5 May – The first bilateral summit between Armenia and the European Union is held in Yerevan.
- 13 May – Turkey lifts restrictions on direct trade with Armenia.
- 23 May — Russia bans the import of Jermuk mineral water, two brands of wine and one brand of cognac from Armenia.
- 29 May — The Eurasian Economic Union called on Armenia to hold a referendum regarding the initiation of the process to join the EU and whether or not to continue its membership in the EAEU.

=== June ===
- 1 June — Russia bans the importation of fish from all but two processing plants in Armenia.
- 6 June – Eurovision Young Musicians 2026
- 7 June – 2026 Armenian parliamentary election: The ruling Civil Contract party of prime minister Nikol Pashinyan wins a new term in government after winning a plurality of 49.8% of the vote.

=== July ===
- 9 July — The government allocates 63,735,000 drams to host the III International Congress of Armenian Studies.
- 22–24 July — The III International Congress of Armenian Studies takes place at the Matenadaran, dedicated to the 350th anniversary of Mkhitar Sebastatsi.

=== October ===
- 29 October — A brawl breaks out in the National Assembly between Civil Contract and Strong Armenia MPs.

== Arts and entertainment ==
- List of Armenian submissions for the Academy Award for Best International Feature Film

== Holidays ==
- 1–2 January – New Year holidays
- 6 January – Christmas
- 28 January – National Army Day
- 8 March – International Women's Day
- 21 April – Easter Monday
- 24 April – Armenian Remembrance Day
- 1 May – Labour Day
- 9 May – Victory and Peace Day
- 28 May – 1st Republic Day
- 5 July – Constitution Day
- 21 September – Independence Day
- 31 December – New Year's Eve

== Deaths ==
- 13 January – Razmik Zohrabyan, 73, MP (2007–2017)
- 6 February – Vardan Khachatryan, 66, minister of finance (2000–2008).
- 6 February – Zori Balayan, 91, writer.
- 9 March – Alisa Kurdian, 82, cinematographer.
- 28 June – Gagik Stamboltsyan, 69, politician, minister of health (1997–1998).

== See also ==
- Outline of Armenia
- List of Armenia-related topics
- History of Armenia
