= 2024 in Armenia =

- Decades: 2000s; 2010s; 2020s
- See also: Other events of 2024; List of years in Armenia

Events of the year 2024 in Armenia.

== Incumbents ==
- President: Vahagn Khachaturyan
- Prime Minister: Nikol Pashinyan
- Speaker: Alen Simonyan

== Arts and entertainment ==
- List of Armenian submissions for the Academy Award for Best International Feature Film

== Events ==
=== February ===
- 1 February – Armenia officially becomes a member of the International Criminal Court
- 13 February – Four soldiers are killed and many others are injured by Azerbaijani troops near the southern village of Nerkin Hand.

=== March ===
- 12 March – The European Parliament passed a resolution confirming Armenia meets Maastricht Treaty Article 49 requirements and that the country may apply for EU membership.
- 19 March – Prime Minister Nikol Pashinyan says he has received an ultimatum from Azerbaijan to return disputed areas or face war.
- 24 March – Three men are arrested after a failed attack on the Nor Nork police precinct in Yerevan, during which two of them are injured.

=== April ===
- 23 April – Start of protests led by Bagrat Galstanyan, demanding the resignation of Prime Minister Nikol Pashinyan.

=== May ===
- 14 May – At the 2024 Copenhagen Democracy Summit, Prime Minister Pashinyan states that he would like Armenia to become a member of the European Union "this year."
- 24 May – Armenia cedes control of the disputed border villages of Bağanis Ayrum (Baghanis), Aşağı Əskipara (Voskepar), Xeyrimli (Kirants) and Qızılhacılı (Berkaber) to Azerbaijan as part of efforts towards a final peace agreement.

=== June ===
- 10 June – 2024 Armenian protests: Several large protests are held in Yerevan calling for Prime Minister Nikol Pashinyan to resign due to Armenia ceding territory to Azerbaijan in the Nagorno-Karabakh conflict.
- 12 June –
  - Prime Minister Pashinyan announces his government's intention to withdraw Armenia from the Collective Security Treaty Organization.
  - Dozens of demonstrators are injured in Yerevan after police fire stun grenades at an anti-government rally outside the National Assembly Building.
  - Armenia joins the Artemis Accords.
- 21 June – Armenia officially recognises the State of Palestine.

=== July ===
- 15–24 July – Armenia holds joint military exercises with the United States titled "Eagle Partner".
- 19 July – A Yak-52 of the Armenian Air Force crashes during a training flight near Yerevan, killing its two-person crew.
- 22 July – The Armenian Armed Forces avails of the European Peace Facility for the first time following a decision by the European Union to award 10 million euros ($10.8 million) in aid.
- 22 July – The European Council approved the European Commission's proposal to begin visa liberalization negotiations with Armenia.
- 26 July-11 August – 15 athletes from Armenia competed at the 2024 Summer Olympics in Paris, France.
- 30 July – Turkey and Armenia resume talks aimed at normalizing diplomatic relations and agree to simplify visa rules for some passport holders.
- 31 July – Russian forces withdraw from Zvartnots International Airport in Yerevan, ending their presence there since 1992.

=== September ===
- 18 September – The Investigative Committee announces that the National Security Service had thwarted a pro-Russian coup by members of the Arbat Battalion.

== Holidays ==
- 1–4 January – New Year holidays
- 6–7 January – Christmas
- 28 January – National Army Day
- 8 March – International Women's Day
- 1 April – Easter Monday
- 24 April – Armenian Remembrance Day
- 1 May – Labour Day
- 9 May – Victory and Peace Day
- 28 May – 1st Republic Day
- 5 July – Constitution Day
- 21 September – Independence Day
- 31 December – New Year's Eve

== Deaths ==
- 14 January: Gagik Tadevosyan, 73, engineer and politician, MP (1995–2003)
- 2 February: Lev Sarkisov, 85, mountaineer
- 6 February: Hrant Ayvazyan, 54, politician, MP (since 2019)

== See also ==
- Outline of Armenia
- List of Armenia-related topics
- History of Armenia
