= 2025 in Armenia =

- Decades: 2000s; 2010s; 2020s
- See also: Other events of 2025; List of years in Armenia

Events of the year 2025 in Armenia.

== Incumbents ==
- President: Vahagn Khachaturyan
- Prime Minister: Nikol Pashinyan
- Speaker: Alen Simonyan

== Events ==
=== March ===
- 1 March – Armenian border guard units have taken over the protection of the Armenian-Iranian and Armenian-Turkish borders from Russian border guard units.
- 26 March – The National Assembly passes a law approving the accession of Armenia to the European Union.

=== May ===
- 15 May – Prime Minister Nikol Pashinyan participated in the 6th Summit of the European Political Community held in Tirana, Albania.

=== June ===
- 9 June – Prime Minister Nikol Pashinyan accuses Karekin II, the Catholicos of All Armenians and supreme head of the Armenian Apostolic Church, of breaking his vow of celibacy and fathering a child and calls for his resignation.
- 25 June – Armenian Apostolic Church archbishop and leader of the opposition Sacred Struggle movement Bagrat Galstanyan is arrested on charges of plotting to overthrow the government.
- 27 June – Armenian Apostolic Church archbishop Mikael Ajapahyan is arrested on charges of plotting to overthrow the government. He is convicted and sentenced to two years' imprisonment on 3 October.

=== July ===
- 8 July – A brawl breaks out in the National Assembly over the lifting of parliamentary immunity of opposition MP Artur Sargsyan.
- 10 July – Prime Minister Pashinyan meets with Azerbaijani president Ilham Aliyev in the United Arab Emirates as part of peace negotiations between their countries.
- 14 July – Prime Minister Pashinyan meets with European Council President Antonio Costa and European Commission President Ursula von der Leyen in Brussels to reaffirm Armenia's deepening partnership with the European Union.

=== August ===
- 8 August – Prime Minister Pashinyan signs a peace agreement with Azerbaijani president Ilham Aliyev in a ceremony hosted by US president Donald Trump in the White House.
- 31 August – Pakistan recognizes Armenia as a country.

=== October ===
- 15 October – Armenian Apostolic Church archbishop Mkrtich Proshyan is arrested along with 12 other clerics on charges of coercing citizens into taking part in public gatherings, theft and electoral obstruction.
- 19 October – Pope Leo XIV canonizes Armenian Catholic prelate Ignatius Maloyan, the Archbishop of Mardin who was killed by the Ottomans during the Armenian genocide for refusing to convert to Islam in 1915.

=== December ===
- 29 December – Turkey and Armenia reach an agreement allowing for the issuance of free electronic visas for holders of diplomatic, special and service passports from both countries.

== Arts and entertainment ==
- List of Armenian submissions for the Academy Award for Best International Feature Film

== Holidays ==
- 1–2 January – New Year holidays
- 6 January – Christmas
- 28 January – National Army Day
- 8 March – International Women's Day
- 21 April – Easter Monday
- 24 April – Armenian Remembrance Day
- 1 May – Labour Day
- 9 May – Victory and Peace Day
- 28 May – 1st Republic Day
- 5 July – Constitution Day
- 21 September – Independence Day
- 31 December – New Year's Eve

== Sports ==
- 2024–25 Armenian Cup
- 13–19 April – 2025 IIHF World Championship Division IV was hosted in Yerevan

== See also ==
- Outline of Armenia
- List of Armenia-related topics
- History of Armenia
