= 2027 in Armenia =

- Decades: 2000s; 2010s; 2020s
- See also: Other events of 2027; List of years in Armenia

Events of the year 2027 in Armenia.

== Events ==
=== Scheduled ===
- 23 August–1 September – 2027 Jeux de la Francophonie

== Arts and entertainment ==
- List of Armenian submissions for the Academy Award for Best International Feature Film

== Holidays ==
- 1–2 January – New Year holidays
- 6 January – Christmas
- 28 January – National Army Day
- 8 March – International Women's Day
- 29 March – Easter Monday
- 24 April – Armenian Remembrance Day
- 1 May – Labour Day
- 9 May – Victory and Peace Day
- 28 May – 1st Republic Day
- 5 July – Constitution Day
- 21 September – Independence Day
- 31 December – New Year's Eve

== See also ==
- Outline of Armenia
- List of Armenia-related topics
- History of Armenia
