= 2023 in Armenia =

- Decades: 2000s; 2010s; 2020s
- See also: Other events of 2023; List of years in Armenia

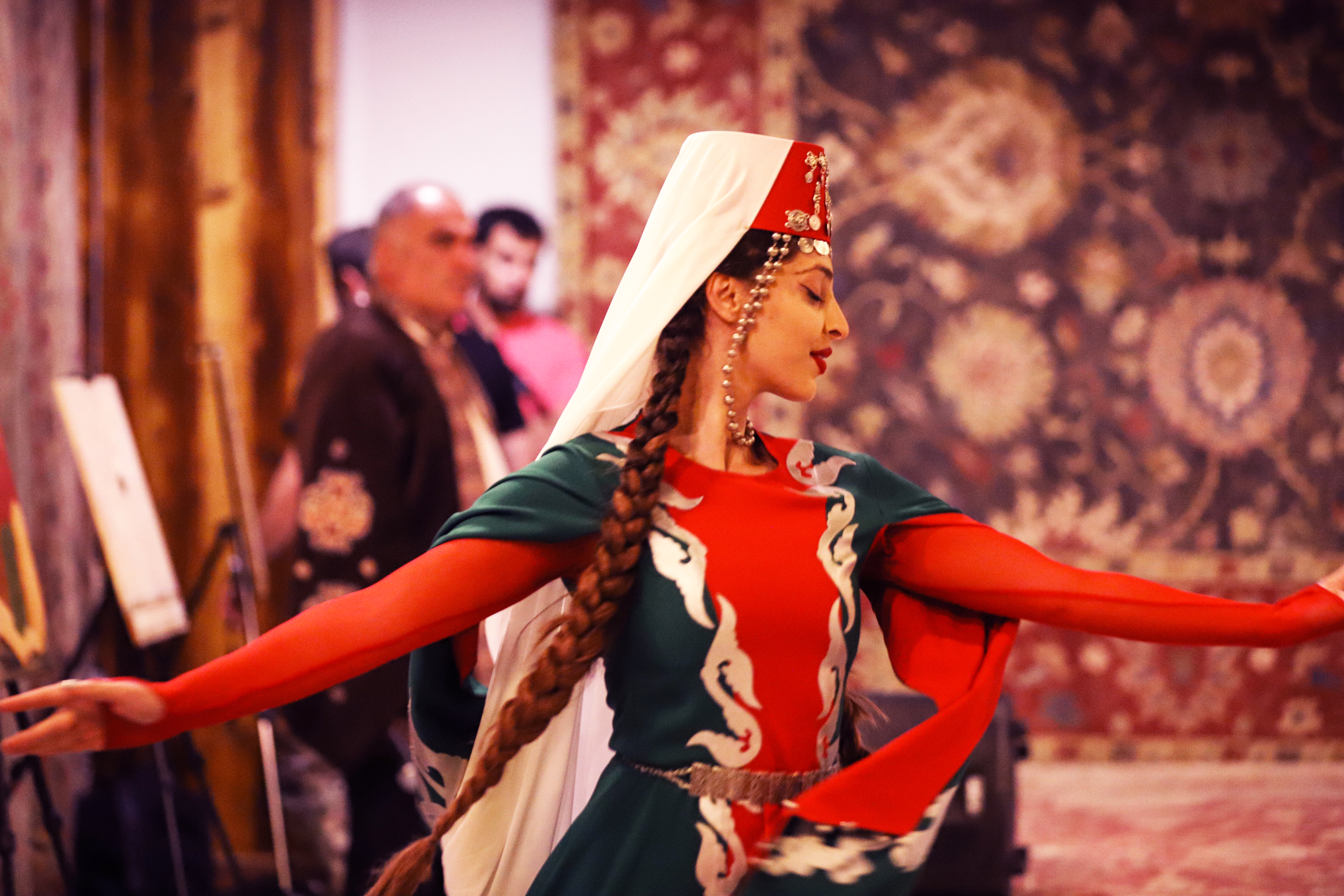
Taraz Fest in Yerevan, Armenia, which took place on August 8th, 2023.

Events of the year 2023 in Armenia.

== Incumbents ==
- President: Vahagn Khachaturyan
- Prime Minister: Nikol Pashinyan
- Speaker: Alen Simonyan

== Events ==
=== January ===
- 10 January – Armenian Prime Minister Nikol Pashinyan announces the postponement of joint military exercises with the Russian Armed Forces under the Collective Security Treaty Organization this year, citing the organization's refusal to condemn Azerbaijan over the disputes.
- 19 January – Fifteen servicemen are killed and seven others are injured after a fire breaks out at a military barrack in Azat.
- 23 January – The European Union Mission in Armenia begins its mandate.

=== February ===
- 16 February – Armenia submits a peace treaty to Azerbaijan in an effort to end the decades-long conflict between the two countries.
- 23 February – State Minister Ruben Vardanyan of the unrecognized Republic of Artsakh is dismissed by President Arayik Harutyunyan after less than four months in office.

=== March ===
- 5 March – Nagorno-Karabakh conflict: Three Armenian police officers and two Azerbaijani soldiers are killed during border clashes near the Lachin Corridor. Both nations accuse each other of opening fire first.

=== April ===
- 3 April – Russia announces a ban on Armenian dairy imports amid a continued worsening of relations between the two countries.
- 11 April – Fighting breaks out near the Armenian village of Tegh, with casualties on both sides.
- 23 April –
  - Armenia says that an Azerbaijani sniper killed an Armenian soldier. The government of Azerbaijan denies the claim, stating that its own soldiers came under fire in Nagorno-Karabakh.
  - Azerbaijan sets up a checkpoint at the Lachin corridor connecting Armenia and Nagorno-Karabakh in violation of the 2020 ceasefire agreement which guarantees free and safe passage to the region.

=== June ===
- 28 June – Four Armenian soldiers are killed by Azerbaijani forces in the separatist region of Artsakh.

=== July ===
- 11 July – Azerbaijan's State Border Service temporarily closes the Lachin corridor, the only road between Armenia and the disputed Nagorno-Karabakh region, alleging smuggling by the Armenian Red Cross Society.
- 14 July – Azerbaijan's State Border Service reopens the Lachin corridor to allow the Red Cross to conduct medical evacuations from Nagorno-Karabakh to Armenia amid protests over the corridor's closure on July 11 and humanitarian concerns.

=== August ===
- 14 August – At least 11 people are killed and nine others are injured in a collision between a truck and a minibus near Lanjik.

=== September ===
- 1 September – Armenia says that shelling by Azerbaijani forces kills two of its soldiers and wounds another in the town of Sotk.
- 11 September – Armenia holds military exercises with the United States known as Eagle Partner.
- 17 September – Yerevan City Council elections were held.
- 19 September –
  - Four Azerbaijani police officers and two civilians are killed by separate mine explosions in Nagorno-Karabakh, with Azerbaijan blaming Armenian sabotage groups.
  - Azerbaijan launches an offensive on Nagorno-Karabakh and demands the withdrawal of ethnic Armenian forces from the region.
  - The Presidential Administration of Azerbaijan says that Armenia must hand over all weapons in order to stop "anti-terrorism" activities.
  - Start of protests demanding the resignation of Prime Minister Nikol Pashinyan.
  - Azerbaijan claims its forces broke through the contact line and captured over 60 military posts in Nagorno-Karabakh. Artsakh forces, however, deny this.
  - According to the Republic of Artsakh government, 25 people, including a child, are killed due to the fighting, and 138 others are injured. Azerbaijan claims that one civilian was killed by shelling in Shusha.
  - Azerbaijani forces strike Stepanakert, the de facto capital of Nagorno-Karabakh, with artillery, damaging several residential buildings.
- 20 September –
  - Armenian separatist forces in Nagorno-Karabakh surrender and agree to a Russian proposal for a ceasefire with Azerbaijan effective from 1 pm on Wednesday.
  - Azerbaijan calls for the "total surrender" of ethnic Armenian forces in Nagorno-Karabakh, and orders the Republic of Artsakh government to dissolve itself, saying its military offensive will continue until the region is under its full control.
  - United States and Armenian forces complete a joint military exercise in Armenia. The exercises were not affected by the 2023 Nagorno-Karabakh clashes.
  - Peace talks between Azerbaijan and the separatists are set for the following day in Yevlakh. Russia's peacekeeping contingent will assist in coordinating the ceasefire.
  - Thousands of Artsakh residents gather at Stepanakert Airport, where some Russian peacekeepers are stationed, seeking evacuation.
- 24 September – The government of Artsakh says that most of its population will leave following Azerbaijan's takeover of the territory with Armenia confirming that 1,050 refugees from Artsakh have arrived in the country.
- 25 September – The number of refugees fleeing to Armenia from Artsakh increases to 6,500.
- 27 September – The number of refugees fleeing Artsakh to Armenia increases to 50,243, more than a third of the region's population.
- 29 September – Samvel Shahramanyan, president of the breakaway Republic of Artsakh, signs a decree to dissolve all state institutions of Artsakh beginning at the start of 2024.

=== October ===
- 3 October – The National Assembly of Armenia ratified the Rome Statute.
- 14 October – Armenian President Vahagn Khachaturyan formally approves the country joining the International Criminal Court.
- 17 October – Armenian Prime Minister Nikol Pashinyan announced that Armenia is prepared to get closer to the European Union, as much as possible.

=== November ===
- 16 November – Armenia joins the International Solar Alliance.

=== December ===
- 8 December – Armenia and Azerbaijan agree to exchange prisoners of war and work towards a peace treaty to formally end the Nagorno-Karabakh conflict and normalize relations.

== Sports ==
- 29 July 2022 – May 2023: 2022–23 Armenian Premier League
- 2022–23 Armenian Cup

== See also ==
- Outline of Armenia
- List of Armenia-related topics
- History of Armenia
