= Yerkrapah =

- Active: July 1993—present
- Country: Armenia
- Role: Paramilitary
- Size: 5,000–30,000
- Motto: Defenders of the Land
- Engagements: First Nagorno-Karabakh War; Four-Day War; Second Nagorno-Karabakh War

Commanders
- Current commander: Sasun Mikayelyan
- Notable commanders: Vazgen Sargsyan; Manvel Grigoryan

Yerkrapah Volunteer Union (Armenian: «Երկրապահ» կամավորական միություն, ԵԿՄ «Yerkrapah» kamavorakan miut'yun, YeKM) or Yerkrapah Union of Veterans, meaning Defenders of the Land, is an Armenian non-governmental group that consisted of 6,000 veterans of the First Nagorno-Karabakh War, formed by Vazgen Sargsyan. The Yerkrapah is a large and influential veteran group. The Yerkrapah Union was actively involved in the First Nagorno-Karabakh War, although after the death of Sargsyan, Yerkrapah's influence in Armenian politics began to decline. Yerkrapah had incorporated between 5,000 and 30,000 veterans. According to Thomas de Waal, after 1994 "the veterans' group Yerkrapah became the most powerful organization in the country."

== Military operations ==
Yerkrapah serves as part the reserve of the army. It sent thousands of armed volunteers fight during the April War of 2016, as well as the Second Nagorno-Karabakh War of 2020.

== Political involvement ==
By 1998, the Yerkrapah parliamentary faction, led by Vazgen Sargsyan as "the power behind the throne", was the largest faction in the National Assembly (it had 69 members). The faction was made up of members of the union. That summer, merged with the Republican Party of Armenia, absorbing the much smaller party in name and legal status. Yerkrapah as a political movement lost their nominal political influence by 2001.

On 25 February 2008, a cohort of top army leaders led by the then-Chief of the General Staff Seyran Ohanyan left the Yerkrapah Union, protesting against its involvement in politics. The move came after the deputy chairman Myasnik Malkhasyan and some other members gave their backing to ex-president Levon Ter-Petrosyan in the protests following the disputed 2008 Armenian presidential election. Then-Yerkrapah chairman and deputy defense minister Manvel Grigoryan also supposedly met with Ter-Petrosyan, who claimed that he had Grigoryan's support.

In 2019, Chairman Sasun Mikayelyan insisted that the organization shall not serve as an 'appendage" of the ruling party, warning of consequences of what happened when the previous governments "tried to make Yerkrapah serve the authorities".

== Youth wing ==
On 9 September 2014, the Ministry of Defense, the Ministry of Education and Science, and Yerkrapah signed a memorandum to implement "Patani Yerkrapah" (Youth Protectors of the Land) patriotic clubs in Armenian educational institutions. Minister of Defense Seyran Ohanyan, stressed the importance of the clubs in contributing to youths' knowledge of Armenian history. In 2016, the youth wing of the Yerkrapah participated in the Independence Day military parade for the first time.

== Yerkrapah Day ==
Yerkrapah Day (Armenian: Երկրապահի օր) is a professional holiday for all members of Yerkrapah, celebrated annually in Armenia on 8 May. The official status of Yerkrapah Day holiday was conceived after the entry of a law which President Robert Kocharyan signed on 6 January 2001 and which the Parliament of Armenia approved on 24 July that year. It is associated with Shushi Liberation Day. Yerkrapah Day is not a non-working day if, depending on the year, it does not fall on a weekend.

== Chairmen ==
- Vazgen Sargsyan (1994-1999)
- Manvel Grigoryan (1999-2019)
- Sasun Mikayelyan (2019-present)

== See also ==
- First Nagorno-Karabakh War
- Artsakh Freedom Fighters Union
