= Kristapor Ivanyan Military College =

Armenian educational institution in Stepanakert

- Քրիստափոր Իվանյանի ռազմական քոլեջ
- Other name: Ivanyan Military School
- Type: College
- Active: 2001–circa 2021
- Affiliations: Artsakh Defense Army
- Director: Lieutenant Colonel Vahram Hakobyan
- Students: 210
- Location: Stepanakert, Artsakh

Kristapor Ivanyan Military College (Armenian: Քրիստափոր Իվանյանի ռազմական քոլեջ), was a college and military educational institution based in Stepanakert and operated by the Artsakh Defense Army. It was named after Lieutenant General Kristapor Ivanyan, a veteran of the Great Patriotic War (1941–45) and the first Karabakh War, as well a key figure in the military history of the Republic of Artsakh. The college was the equivalent to the Moscow Suvorov Military School in Russia, and the Monte Melkonian Military College in Armenia.

== History ==
In 2007, a contingent from the college became a permanent participant in the Shushi Liberation Day military parade on Renaissance Square. Notable visitors have included President of the National Assembly of Armenia Ararat Mirzoyan. Immediately after the Second Nagorno-Karabakh War and the signing of the ceasefire agreement, the activities of the school were suspended, as the Government of Armenia had stopped funding. The school building was given to the 15th Separate Guards Motor Rifle Brigade of the Russian Ground Forces for their peacekeeping operations in Nagorno-Karabakh, effectively liquidating the school.. The Defence Army itself was later disbanded on 20 September 2023 under the terms of the ceasefire agreement following the 2023 Azerbaijani military offensive.

== Students ==
Admission into the college starts in the 9th grade, with the principles and structure of an Armenian secondary school. Education was carried out on the basis of general education programs, with a number of highly specialized subjects. Applicants are subject to physical fitness tests upon arrival at the school. School pupils often visit to school open days. The school was currently co-ed, having accepted female cadets for the first time in 2015. The number was very small during the 2015-2016 school year, but only after the four-day war in 2016 did the number of girls increase. In 2017, Eva Ghazaryan became the first female graduate of college, later studying at the Armenak Khanperyants Military Aviation University.

== See also ==
- Artsakh Defense Army
- Armed Forces of Armenia
- Kristapor Ivanyan
