= Tadevosyan =

Tadevosyan is a surname, Notable people with this surname include:

- Alexander Tadevosyan (born 1980), Armenian retired footballer
- Arkady Ter-Tadevosyan (1939-2021), military leader
- Armine Tadevosyan, Armenian professional footballer
- Gagik Tadevosyan (1950-2024), Armenian engineer and politician
- Vahe Tadevosyan (born 1983), Armenian football striker
- Yeghishe Tadevosyan (1870-1936), Soviet-Armenian painter
