= Public holidays in Armenia =

The following is a list of public holidays in Armenia.

== Legal holidays and remembrance days ==
=== Non-working legal holidays and remembrance days ===
Per Armenian law, 13 days are declared as non-working days. Non-working days include:

Date	English name	Local name	Remarks
1–2 January	New Year's Day	Ամանոր	Tradition
6 January	Christmas Day	Սուրբ Ծնունդ	Based on the calendar used in Armenian Apostolic Church
27 January	Memorial Day	Հայրենիքի պաշտպանության համար զոհվածների հիշատակի օր	Memorial Day of those who fell in defense of the homeland
28 January	Army Day	Բանակի օր	In celebration of Armenian Army formation on that day in 1992
8 March	International Women's Day	Կանանց տոն	Women's Day
24 April	Armenian Genocide Remembrance Day	Եղեռնի զոհերի հիշատակի օր	Remembrance of victims of Armenian Genocide in 1915
1 May	Labour Day	Աշխատանքի օր	International Workers' Day
9 May	Victory and Peace Day	Հաղթանակի և Խաղաղության տոն	Shushi Liberation Day - on May 8, 1992, Armenian forces captured the city from Azerbaijani military forces, marking an important milestone in Nagorno Karabakh war for Armenians. Victory Day : 9 May (World War II) was a holiday throughout the USSR and is still an official holiday in Armenia.
28 May	Republic Day	Հանրապետության օր	Establishment of the Democratic Republic of Armenia in 1918
5 July	Constitution Day	Սահմանադրության օր	Adopted in 1995
21 September	Independence Day	Անկախության օր	Independence from the Soviet Union in 1991
31 December	New Year's Eve	Ամանոր	

=== Other legal holidays ===
The following days are mentioned in relevant laws, but are not specified as non-working days:

Date	English Descript	Local name	Remarks
19 February	Book Giving Day - Hovhannes Tumanyan's Birthday	Գիրք նվիրելու օր - Հովհաննես Թումանյանի ծննդյան օր	
21 February	Mother Language Day	Մայրենի լեզվի օր	Corresponding to International Mother Language Day
8th Thursday before Easter	Saint Vardanian's Day - the day of good activities and national tribute	Սուրբ Վարդանանց տոն՝ բարի գործի և ազգային տուրքի օր	
28 February	Day of remembrance for victims of massacres organized in Azerbaijan SSR and protection of rights of Armenian refugees	Ադրբեջանական ԽՍՀ-ում կազմակերպված ջարդերի զոհերի հիշատակի և բռնագաղթված հայ բնակչության իրավունքների պաշտպանության օր	
7 April	Motherhood and Beauty Day	Մայրության և գեղեցկության տոն	
16 April	Day of Armenian Cinema	Հայ կինոյի օր	
Last Saturday (or last Sunday if last Saturday is April 24) of April	Day of Citizen of Republic of Armenia	Հայաստանի Հանրապետության քաղաքացու օր	Introduced after 2018 Armenian revolution
8 May	Defenders of the Country Day	Երկրապահի օր	Day of Yerkrapah veterans
15 May	Family Day	Ընտանիքի օր	
16 May	Students and Youth Day	Ուսանողների և երիտասարդների օր	
1 June	Protection of Children's Rights Day	Երեխաների իրավունքների պաշտպանության օր	Corresponding to international Children's Day
14 June	Day of Remembrance for the oppressed	Բռնադատվածների հիշատակի օր	
64th day after Easter	Holiday of Saint Etchmiadzin	Սուրբ Էջմիածնի տոն	
1 September	Knowledge and School Day	Գիտելիքի և դպրության օր	Knowledge and School Day marks start of school year
12 September	Sparapet Day	Սպարապետի օր	Honors the memory of Mkhitar Sparapet
5 October	Teachers' Day	Ուսուցչի օր	Corresponding to World Teachers' Day
Second Saturday of October	Translators' Day	Թարգմանչաց տոն	Remembering the Holy Translators
10 November	Day of local self-governance	Տեղական ինքնակառավարման օր	
7 December	Day of Remembrance for Earthquake Victims and Disaster Resistance	Երկրաշարժի զոհերի հիշատակի օր	Remembrance of victims of 1988 earthquake
9 December	Day of condemning and preventing genocides	Ցեղասպանությունների դատապարտման և կանխարգելման օր	

Other traditional, international and professional holidays, as well as religious holidays, can also be celebrated in Armenia. National minorities can also celebrate their national holidays.

== Reshuffling by government ==
The Government of Armenia is allowed to swap working and non-working days. It usually makes use of this e.g. declaring Easter Monday non-working, while the next Saturday becomes a working day instead.

== Other memorable days ==
=== Vardavar ===
Every year, 14 weeks after Easter, Armenians celebrate Vardavar (Վարդավար), a festival where people soak each other with water using hoses, buckets, spray guns, and other tools.

The origins of Vardavar trace back to ancient Armenian pagan traditions. Historically, on this day known as Water Day, Armenians made offerings of red roses to Astłik, the goddess of water, beauty, love, and fertility. The name "Vardavar" itself is a blend of the words "vard" (meaning "rose") and "var" (meaning "burn") in Armenian.

Despite its pagan roots, Vardavar has been seamlessly integrated into Christian Armenian culture. Following Armenia's conversion to Christianity in 301 AD, the explicit pagan elements were removed from the celebration. However, the festival's essence, symbolized by the joyous and communal water splashing, remains a beloved tradition.

=== Armenian Earthquake Memorial Day ===
Armenian Earthquake Memorial Day is a day of remembrance in Armenia for the earthquake of magnitude 6.9 on the Richter scale that struck in northwest Armenia (then part of the Soviet Union) on 7 December 1988. The earthquake damaged much of the country's infrastructure, especially in the cities of Spitak, Leninakan (now Gyumri), Kirovakan (now Vanadzor), and Stepanavan, along with other small towns and villages near the epicenter.

Each year, 7 December is recognized by the government of Armenia (and formerly the de facto government of Nagorno-Karabakh) as a day of remembrance of the tragedies that stemmed from the earthquake in 1988.

=== Motherhood and Beauty Day ===
Motherhood and beauty day (Armenian: Մայրության և գեղեցկության օր) is an official holiday in Armenia dedicated to women. While March 8 celebrates all women, April 7 is mother's day. April 7 is the Feast of the Annunciation in the calendar of the Armenian Apostolic Church. It is expected to give presents to one's own mother. Celebrating each woman as beautiful in her own way, mothers are particularly happy to receive flowers.

== See also ==
- Public holidays in the Republic of Artsakh
