= Kristapor Ivanyan =

Armenian general

- Քրիստափոր Իվանյան
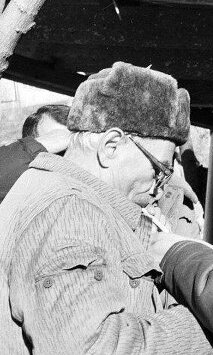
- Born: Kristapor Ivanyan; 20 December 1920; Tiflis, Georgia
- Died: 30 August 1999 (aged 78); Saint Petersburg, Russia
- Military career
- Allegiance: Soviet Union (Republic of Artsakh) Nagorno-Karabakh Republic; Armenia
- Branch: Soviet Army; Nagorno-Karabakh Defense Army; Armed Forces of Armenia
- Service years: 1938–1978; 1992–1998
- Rank: Lieutenant general
- Commands: 195th Mortar Regiment; 318th Infantry Division; 280th Guards Tank Regiment; 52nd Rifle Brigade; 14th Army
- Conflicts: World War II; First Nagorno-Karabakh War
- Awards: see below

Kristapor Ivani Ivanyan (Armenian: Քրիստափոր Իվանի Իվանյան, Russian: Христофо́р Ива́нович Иваня́н; 20 December 1920 – 30 August 1999) was a Soviet and Armenian lieutenant general. He fought in both World War II and the First Nagorno-Karabakh War. He was one of the founders of the Nagorno-Karabakh Defense Army.

A military school in Stepanakert is named after Ivanyan. In 2001, the Nagorno-Karabakh Republic renamed the town of Khojaly to Ivanyan in his honor, and a statue of Ivanyan was unveiled in Stepanakert on the tenth anniversary of the proclamation of Nagorno-Karabakh's independence.

== Biography ==
=== Soviet Army ===
Ivanyan was born in Tiflis to Armenian parents. He joined the Soviet Armed Forces in 1938. In 1940 he graduated from the Tbilisi Artillery School. During the Eastern Front of World War II, Ivanyan fought in Crimea, Transcarpathia, and Czechoslovakia. Ivanyan served as an Artillery Regiment Commander advisor from 1941 to 1942, and from 1942 to 1943 became commander of the 195th Mortar Regiment. From 1943 to 1944, he was the 318th Infantry Division Artillery commander, as part of Czechoslovakia. He was wounded several times, and was awarded various orders and medals. In 1949, he graduated from the Frunze Military Academy, and then was the head of the preparatory artillery corps from 1949 to 1952. Ivanyan than became the 280th Guards Tank Regiment commander from 1952 to 1955, as part of the Soviet forces stationed in the German Democratic Republic. Then from 1956 to 1958, he was the Special Guards Tank Regiment commander. Ivanyan was the Head of the Department of Military at the Odessa State University from 1958 to 1961, then took graduate courses from the Leningrad Military District Artillery Academy, graduating in 1962. He was the Odessa Military District commander of the 52nd Rifle Brigade from 1962 to 1968 and the Odessa Military District's 14th Army commander of the missile troops and artillery from 1968 to 1973. In 1973, Ivanyan became the Transcaucasian Military District deputy commander of the missile troops and artillery. He served in the position for five years before retiring from the Soviet Army in 1978.

=== Nagorno-Karabakh Army ===
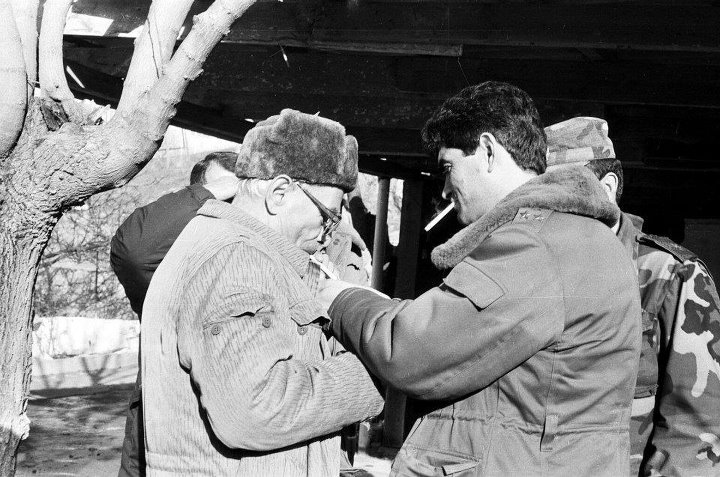
Kristapor Ivanyan (left) with Vitaly Balasanyan

With the height of the military phase of the First Nagorno-Karabakh War, Ivanyan came from Saint Petersburg to Nagorno-Karabakh in order to serve Armenia. In 1992, he became an advisor to the Chairman of the Committee of the Nagorno-Karabakh Defense Army, and was the First Deputy Commander of the Nagorno-Karabakh Republic Ministry of Defense. Ivanyan made a significant contribution to the formation of the army structures and services of the Nagorno-Karabakh Republic, especially in artillery, creating the training of military units, centers, shooting ranges, and polygons. He managed a number of military operations to suppress the enemy firing points, particularly in areas adjacent to Stepanakert territories and Martuni Region of Nagorno Karabakh. For courage in battle and bravery, he was awarded the Order of the Combat Cross, 1st degree. He retired from the Armenian and Nagorno-Karabakh Armed Forces in 1998.

He died a year later on 30 August 1999.

== Legacy ==
Ivanyan was posthumously awarded the Hero of Artsakh medal in 2000. The Nagorno-Karabakh Defense Army Stepanakert Military School is named after Ivanyan. The town of Khojaly was renamed Ivanyan in 2001 by the Nagorno-Karabakh Republic in honor of him. On the tenth anniversary of the proclamation of Nagorno-Karabakh's independence, a statue of Ivanyan was unveiled in Stepanakert. An event dedicated to the 90th birthday of Ivanyan took place at the Stepanakert Youth and Culture Palace on 20 December 2010, and was attended by the Nagorno-Karabakh President Bako Sahakyan, Primate of the Artsakh Diocese of Armenian Apostolic Church Archbishop Pargev Martirosyan, Prime Minister Arayik Harutyunyan, Chairman of the National Assembly Ashot Ghulian, and other officials. A documentary film about his life has also been made.

== Awards ==
- (Soviet Union) Order of Lenin, twice
- (Soviet Union) Order of the Red Banner
- (Soviet Union) Order of Suvorov, 3rd degree
- (Soviet Union) Order of the Patriotic War
- (Soviet Union) Order of the Red Star, three times
- (Soviet Union) Jubilee Medal "In Commemoration of the 100th Anniversary since the Birth of Vladimir Il'ich Lenin"
- (Soviet Union) Medal "For Distinction in Military Service"
- (Soviet Union) Medal "For the Defence of the Caucasus"
- (Soviet Union) Medal "For the Victory over Germany in the Great Patriotic War 1941–1945"
- (Soviet Union) Jubilee Medal "30 Years of the Soviet Army and Navy"
- (Soviet Union) Jubilee Medal "40 Years of the Armed Forces of the USSR"
- (Czechoslovakia) Czechoslovak War Cross 1939-1945
- (Armenia) Order of the Combat Cross, 1st degree
- (Armenia) Medal of Marshal Baghramyan
- (Republic of Artsakh) Hero of Artsakh (2000)
