= Édouard Dulaurier =

French orientalist (1807–1881)

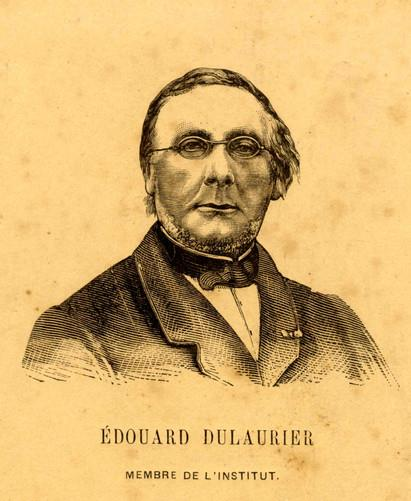
- Born: 29 January 1807; Toulouse
- Died: 21 December 1881 (aged 74); Meudon
- Occupations: Orientalist; Egyptologist

Jean Paul Louis François Édouard Leuge-Dulaurier (29 January 1807 – 21 December 1881) was a French Orientalist, Armenian studies scholar and Egyptologist.

Dulaurier was born in Toulouse. He succeeded Paul Émile Levaillant de Florival, on the former's death in 1862, as professor of the Armenian language at the Ecole spéciale des Langues orientales. He also established the chair for the Malay language. He was also a member of the Institut de France (Académie des Inscriptions et Belles-Lettres). He died in Meudon.

Dulaurier was a major contributor to the Recueil des historiens des croisades, for the part related to Armenian sources which he edited and translated into French. This work is still considered a major source of the period and is available online.

== Publications ==
- Examen d'un passage des Stromates de saint Clément d'Alexandrie relatif aux écritures égyptiennes, Paris, H. Fournier jeune, 1833.
- Fragment des révélations de saint Barthélemy et de l'histoire des communautés religieuses fondées par saint Pakhome, traduit sur les textes coptes-thébains inédits conservés à la Bibliothèque du Roi, Paris, Imprimerie royale, 1835.
- Rapport adressé à M. le Ministre de l'Instruction publique sur les manuscrits malays [sic] et javanais conservés dans la bibliothèque de la Compagnie des Indes orientales... et de la Société royale asiatique, à Londres..., Paris, Panckoucke, 1840.
- Fragment d'un traité de médecine copte faisant partie de la collection des manuscrits du cardinal Borgia publiée par Zoega, Paris, 1843 (?).
- Lettres et pièces diplomatiques écrites en malay [sic], recueillies et publiées pour servir d'exercices de lecture et de traduction aux élèves de l'École royale et spéciale des langues orientales, Paris, Firmin-Didot, 1845.
- « Institutions maritimes de l'Archipel d'Asie. Textes malay et bougui », in Jean-Marie Pardessus (dir.), Collection des lois maritimes antérieures au XVIIIe, vol. 6, Paris, B. Duprat, 1845.
- « Description de l'Archipel d'Asie par Ibn Battuta, traduite de l'arabe par M. Édouard Dulaurier », Journal asiatique, février 1847, (p. 93–134), et mars 1847, (p. 218–259).
- Examen de quelques points des doctrines de J.-F. Champollion relatives à l'écriture hiéroglyphique des anciens Égyptiens, Paris, Firmin-Didot, 1847.
- Collection des principales chroniques malayes (1er fascicule, comprenant la chronique du royaume de Pasey et une partie des annales malayes), Paris, Imprimerie nationale, 1849.
- Récit de la première croisade extrait de la chronique de Matthieu d'Édesse, Paris, B. Duprat, 1850.
- Études sur les chants historiques et les traditions populaires de l'ancienne Arménie, Paris, Imprimerie nationale, 1852.
- Collection des principales chroniques malayes (2e fascicule, la suite des annales malayes), Paris, Imprimerie nationale, 1856.
- Bibliothèque historique arménienne, ou choix des principaux historiens arméniens traduits en français, Paris, A. Durand, 1858.
- Recherches sur la chronologie arménienne, technique et historique, Paris Imprimerie impériale, 1859.
- Histoire, dogmes, traditions et liturgie de l'Église arménienne orientale, avec des notions additionnelles sur l'origine de cette liturgie, les sept sacrements, les observances, la hiérarchie ecclésiastique, les vêtements sacerdotaux et la forme intérieure des églises chez les Arméniens, Paris, A. Durand, 1859.
- Les Mongols d'après les historiens arméniens : fragments traduits sur les textes originaux, Paris, Imprimerie impériale, 1860 (extrait du Journal asiatique).
- Étude sur l'organisation politique, religieuse et administrative du royaume de la Petite-Arménie à l'époque des croisades, Paris, Imprimerie impériale, 1862 (extrait du Journal asiatique).
- Recueil des historiens des croisades. Documents arméniens, tome I, Paris, Imprimerie nationale, 1869.
- Histoire universelle, par Étienne Açogh'ig de Daron, traduite de l'arménien et annotée par Édouard Dulaurier. Première partie, Paris, E. Leroux, 1883.
