= Razmik Zohrabyan =

Armenian politician (1950–2026)

- Ռազմիկ Զոհրաբյան

Member of the National Assembly of Armenia
- In office 19 June 2007 – 2 March 2017

Personal details
- Born: Razmik Artavazdi Zohrabyan; 1 April 1950 Yerevan, Armenian SSR, USSR
- Died: 13 January 2026 (aged 75)
- Party: RPA
- Occupation: Factory worker

Razmik Artavazdi Zohrabyan (Armenian: Ռազմիկ Արտավազդի Զոհրաբյան; 1 April 1950 – 13 January 2026) was an Armenian politician. A member of the Republican Party, he served in the National Assembly from 2007 to 2017.

Zohrabyan died on 13 January 2026, at the age of 75.
