= Renaissance Square, Stepanakert =

Square in Stepanakert, Karabakh, Azerbaijan

Renaissance Square
- Veratsnound
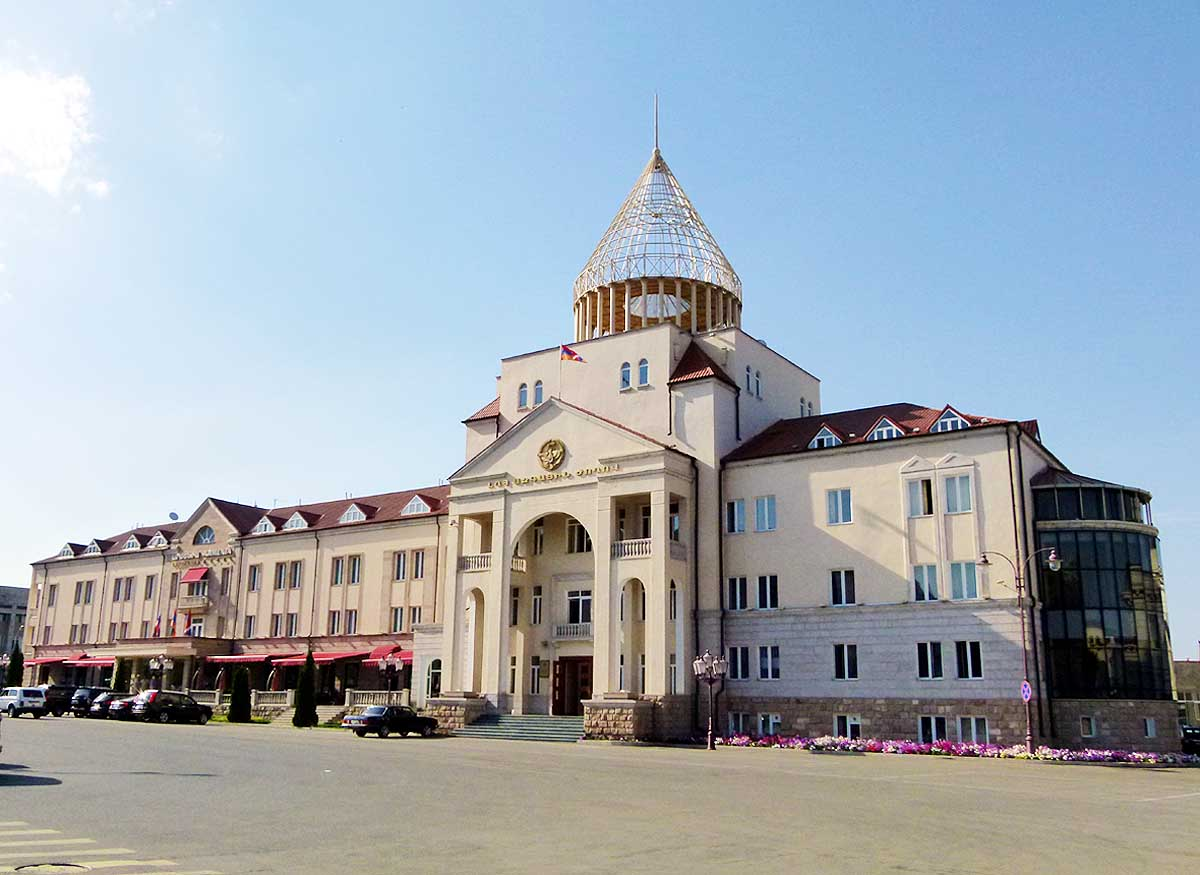
- National Assembly
- Interactive map of Renaissance Square
- Native name: Վերածննդի հրապարակ (Armenian)
- Former name: Lenin Square
- Type: Square
- Location: Stepanakert, Nagorno-Karabakh, Azerbaijan
- Coordinates: 39°49′3″N 46°45′3″E

Construction
- Completion: 1994; 32 years ago

Other
- Known for: The central square of Stepanakert

Renaissance Square (Armenian: Վերածննդի հրապարակ), commonly known as Veratsnound or Revival Square or Victory Square (Azerbaijani: Zəfər meydanı) was the main square in the city of Stepanakert, Nagorno-Karabakh, Azerbaijan. It was developed in 1994 following the Battle of Shusha and the securing of the area by the Artsakh Defense Army.

== History ==
=== Soviet era ===
The Presidential Palace, which was the former residence of the President of Artsakh, is the main building in the square. It is the former building of the Nagorno-Karabakh Regional Committee of the Communist Party of Azerbaijan, having been built in the 1960s.

=== Artsakh era ===
The following landmarks and buildings were located on the square when the city was under Armenian control:

- Presidential Palace
- Artsakh Freedom Fighters Union Building
- National Assembly of Artsakh Building
- Embassy of Armenia
- Palace of Youth
- Hotel Armenia

The square commonly hosted political and social rallies, weapons exhibitions, New Year's Eve events and processions. During the Shushi Liberation Day celebrations, a military parade of the former Defence Army took place. During a visit to the capital in August 2019, Armenian Prime Minister Nikol Pashinyan led a mass rally on the square with chants of "Unification", which was originally chanted during the Karabakh movement in the late 80s.

=== Azerbaijani control ===
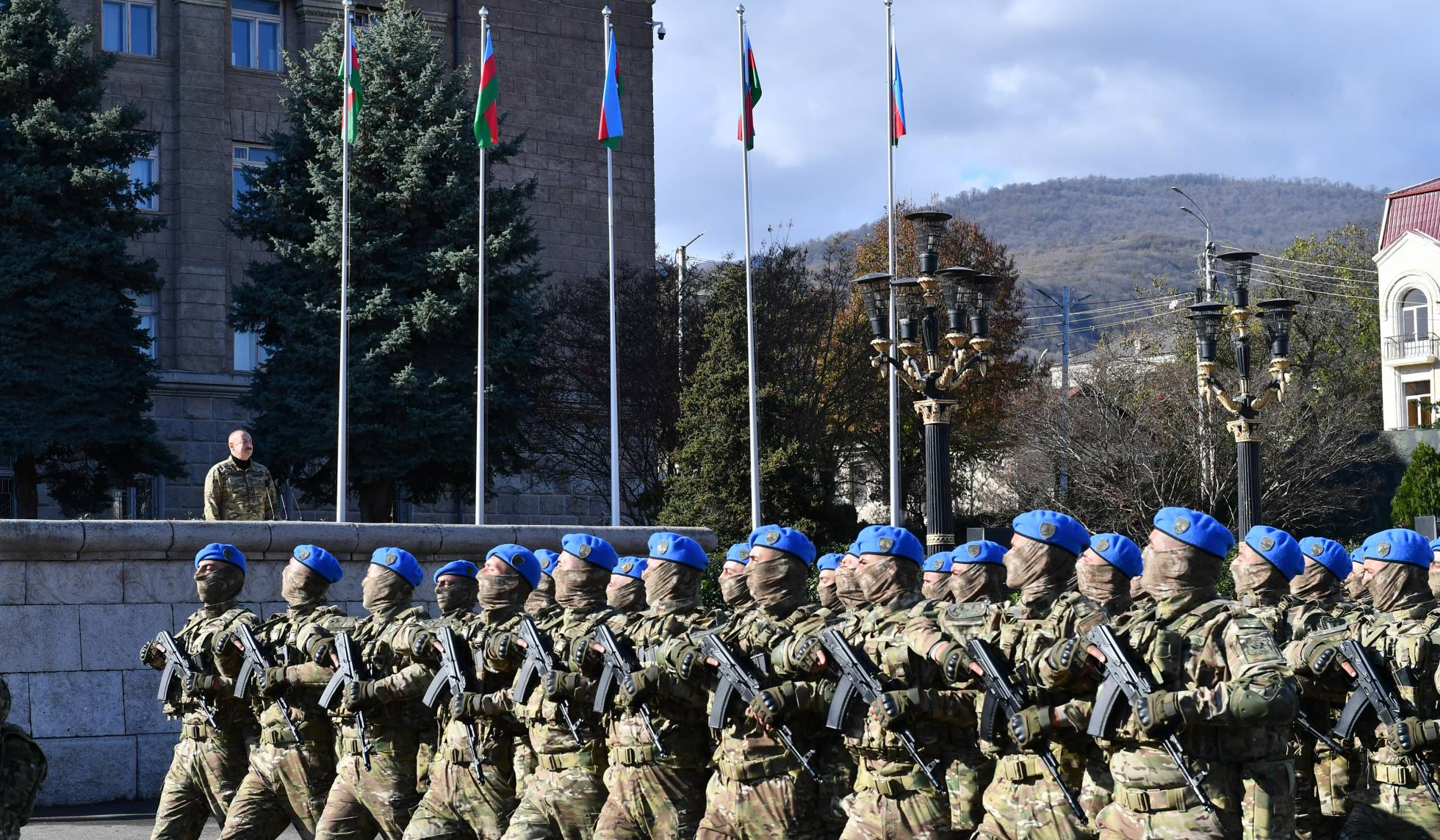
Azerbaijani Commandos marching past President Ilham Aliyev during a Victory Day parade on 8 November 2023.

Stepanakert came under the control of Azerbaijan on 29 September 2023, after the Azerbaijani offensive in Nagorno-Karabakh on 19–20 September 2023, which led to the dissolution of the de facto Republic of Artsakh. A Victory Day parade took place on the square in the presence of President Ilham Aliyev on 8 November 2023. In early March 2024, Azerbaijani authorities demolished the National Assembly of Artsakh building and the Artsakh Freedom Fighters Union building.

== Gallery ==
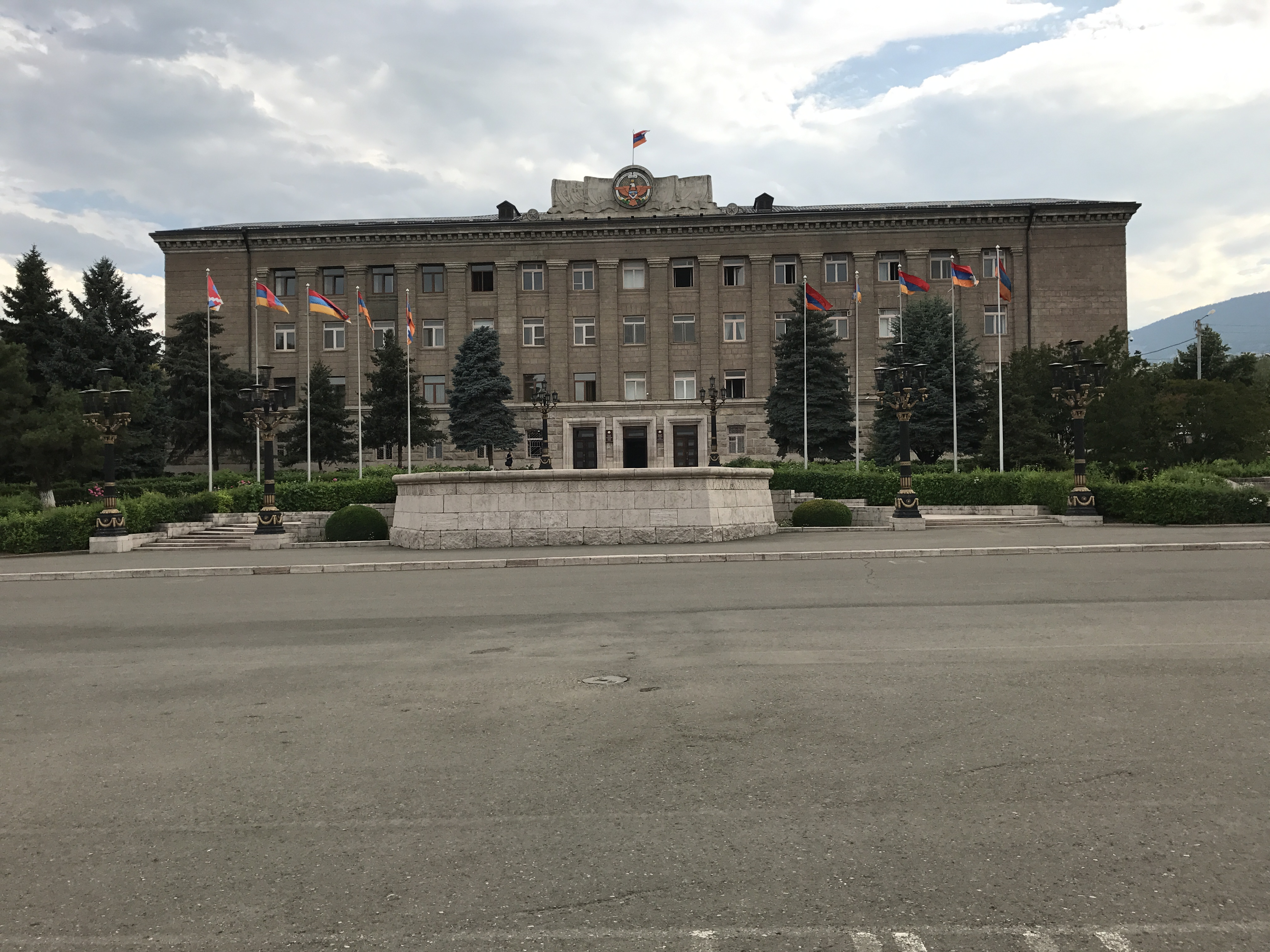
Presidential Palace

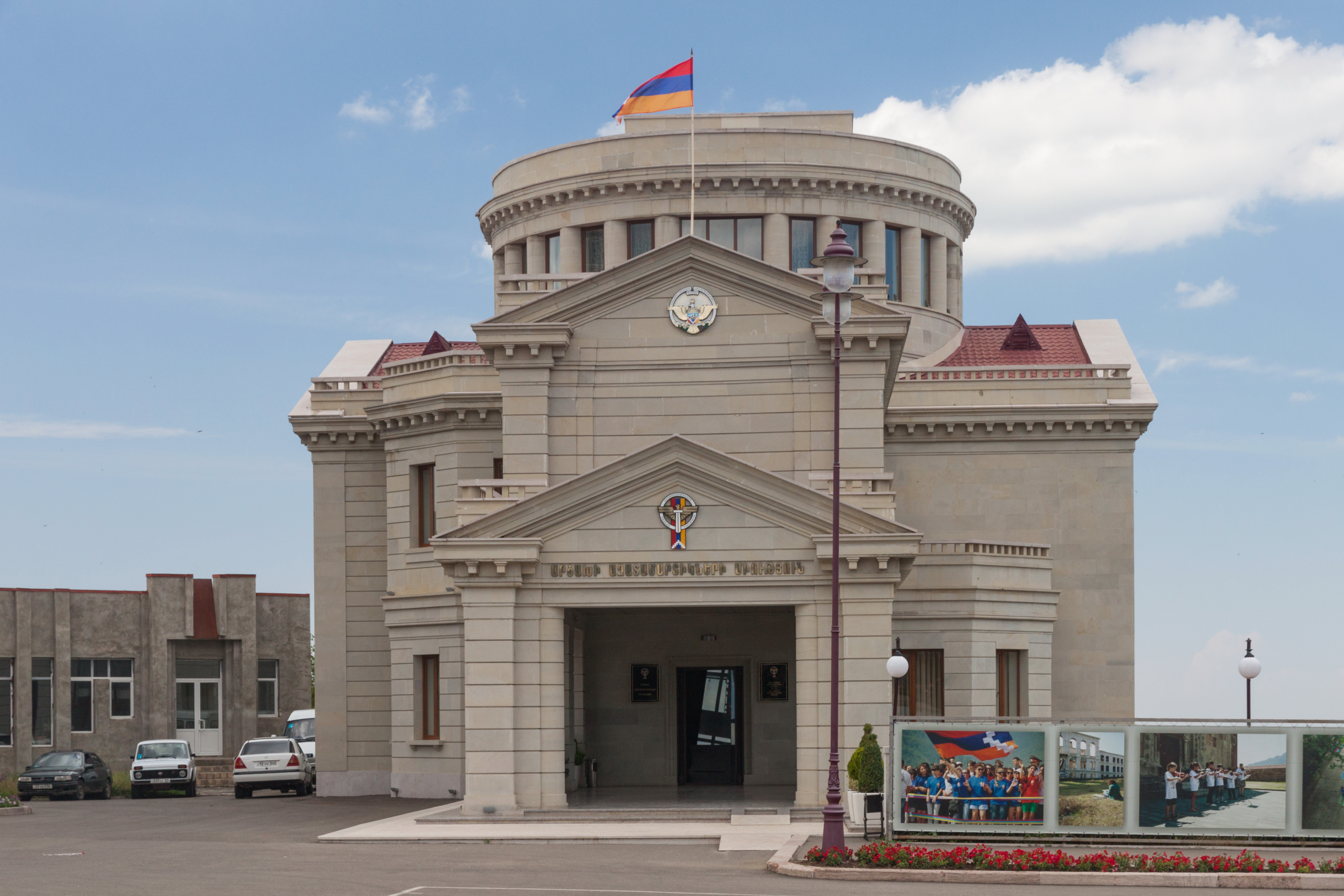
Union of Artsakh Freedom Fighters building.

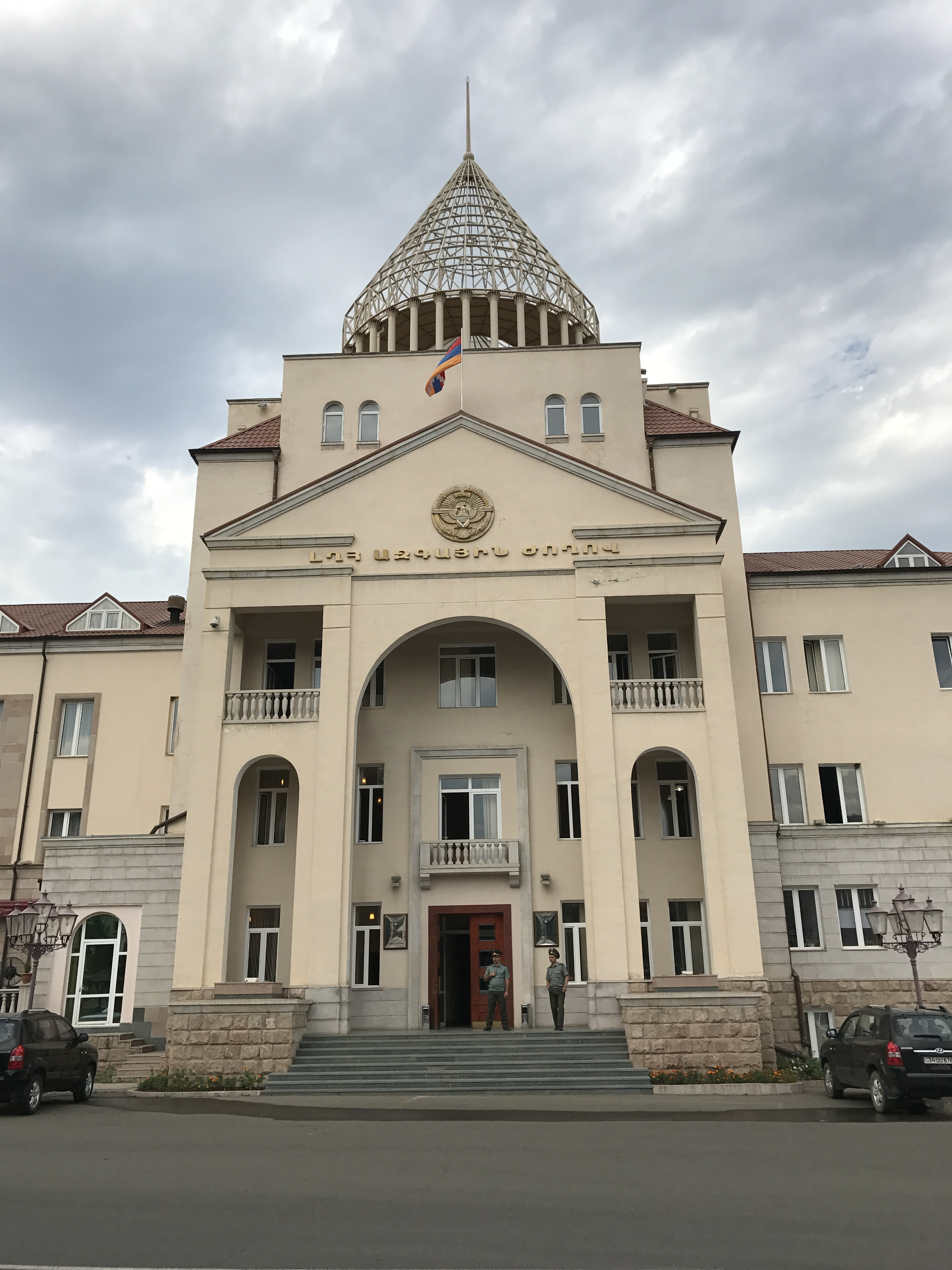
National Assembly building.

Ameria Bank
