= Armenian Red Cross Society =

- Founded: 19 March 1920
- Type: Non-profit organisation
- Purpose: Humanitarian Aid
- Location: Armenia
- Affiliations: International Committee of the Red Cross; International Federation of Red Cross and Red Crescent Societies
- Website: redcross.am

The Armenian Red Cross Society (Armenian: Հայկական Կարմիր խաչի ընկերություն, romanized: Haykakan Karmir khach'i ynkerut'yunn) was established in 1920 and it has its headquarters in Yerevan.

It supports people affected by the Nagorno-Karabakh conflict.
