= Lanjik =

Village in Shirak, Armenia

Lanjik Լանջիկ
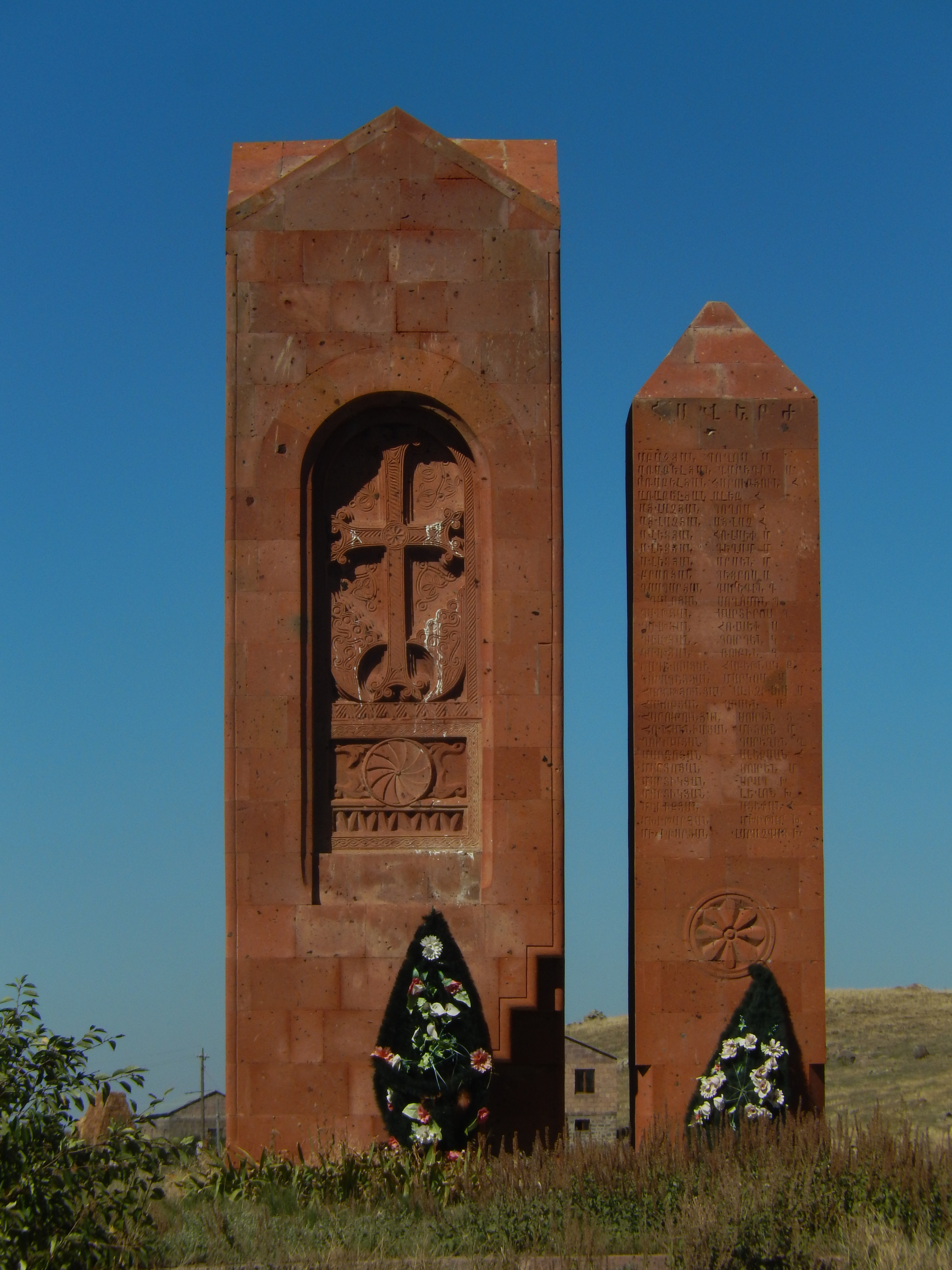

- Location within Armenia Location within Shirak
- Coordinates: 40°30′34″N 43°51′23″E
- Country: Armenia
- Province: Shirak
- Municipality: Ani

Population (2011)
  - Total: 853
- Time zone: UTC+4
  - Summer (DST): UTC+5

Lanjik (Armenian: Լանջիկ) is a village in the Ani Municipality of the Shirak Province of Armenia.

== Demographics ==
Historical population
Year	Pop.	±% p.a.
1873	411	—
1897	664	+2.02%
1926	663	−0.01%
1939	719	+0.63%
1959	699	−0.14%
1970	837	+1.65%
1979	777	−0.82%
2001	924	+0.79%
2011	853	−0.80%
