= Nerkin Hand =

Nerkin Hand Ներքին Հանդ
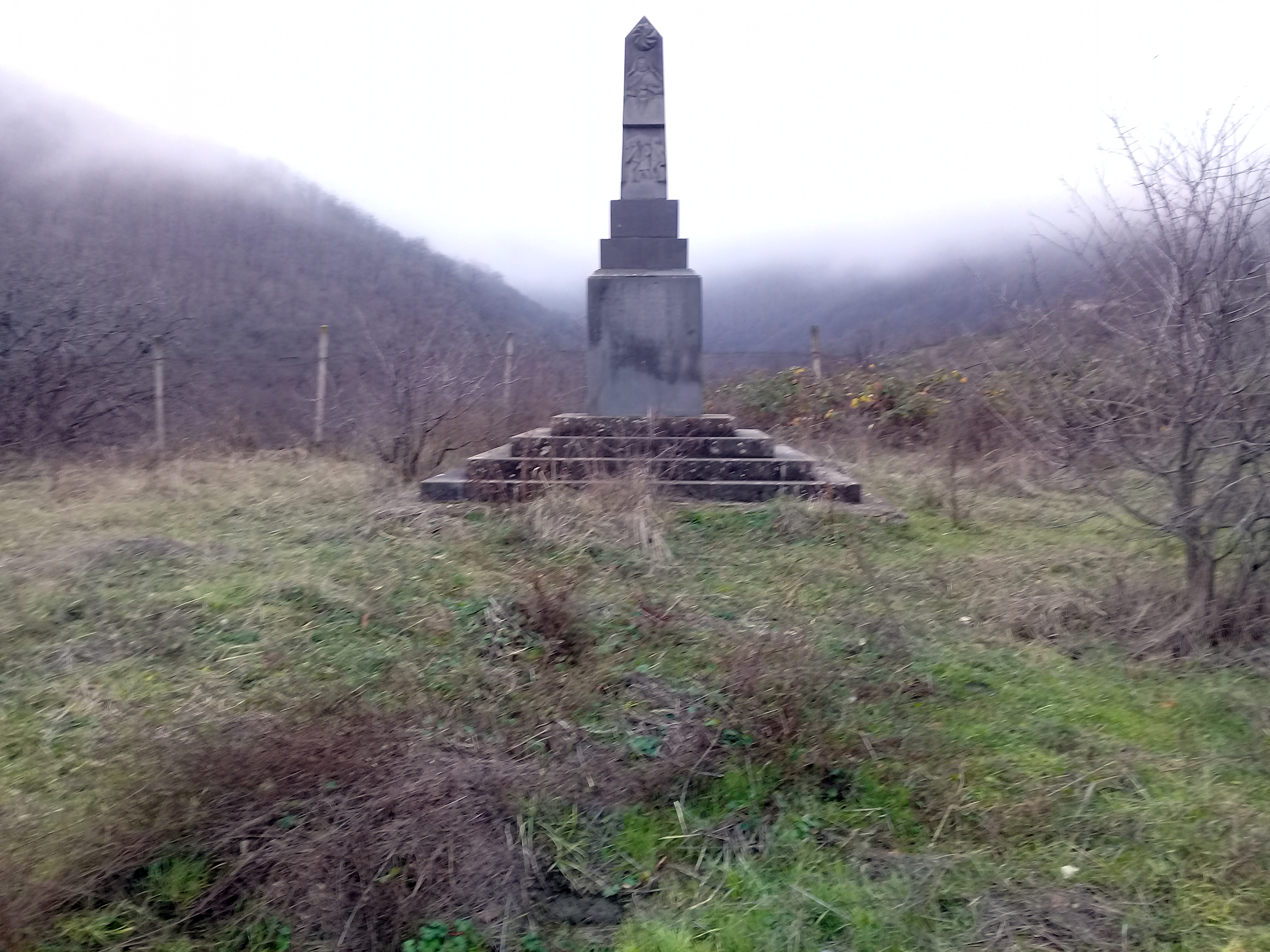
- WWII monument in Nerkin Hand

- Location within Armenia Location within Syunik Province
- Coordinates: 39°02′28″N 46°31′01″E
- Country: Armenia
- Province: Syunik
- Municipality: Kapan

Area
  - Total: 9.64 km^{2} (3.72 sq mi)

Population (2011)
  - Total: 97
  - Density: 10/km^{2} (26/sq mi)
- Time zone: UTC+4 (AMT)

Nerkin Hand (Armenian: Ներքին Հանդ) is a village in the Kapan Municipality of the Syunik Province in Armenia.

== Demographics ==
The Statistical Committee of Armenia reported its population was 78 in 2010, down from 113 at the 2001 census.
