= Mkrtich Proshyan =

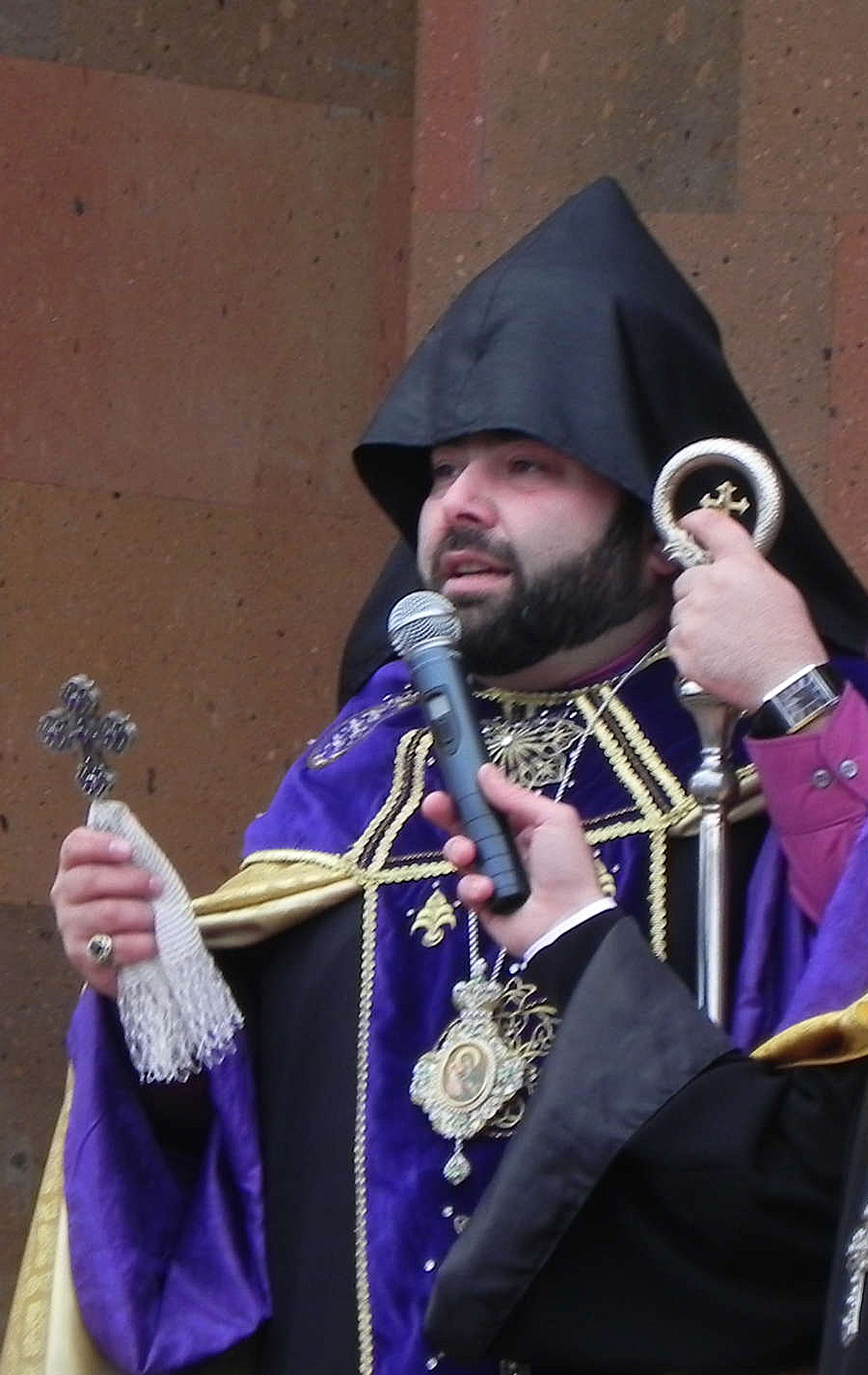
Proshyan in 2013

Mkrtich Proshyan (Մկրտիչ Պռոշյան; born 13 August 1975) is Bishop of the Diocese of Aragatsotn in the Armenian Apostolic Church.

In October 2025 Proshyan was arrested and charged with "coercing citizens into taking part in public gatherings" as part of the ongoing Armenian political crisis.

Proshyan is the nephew of Catholicos Karekin II.
