= Artsakh Freedom Fighters Union =

- Արցախի ազատամարտիկների միություն
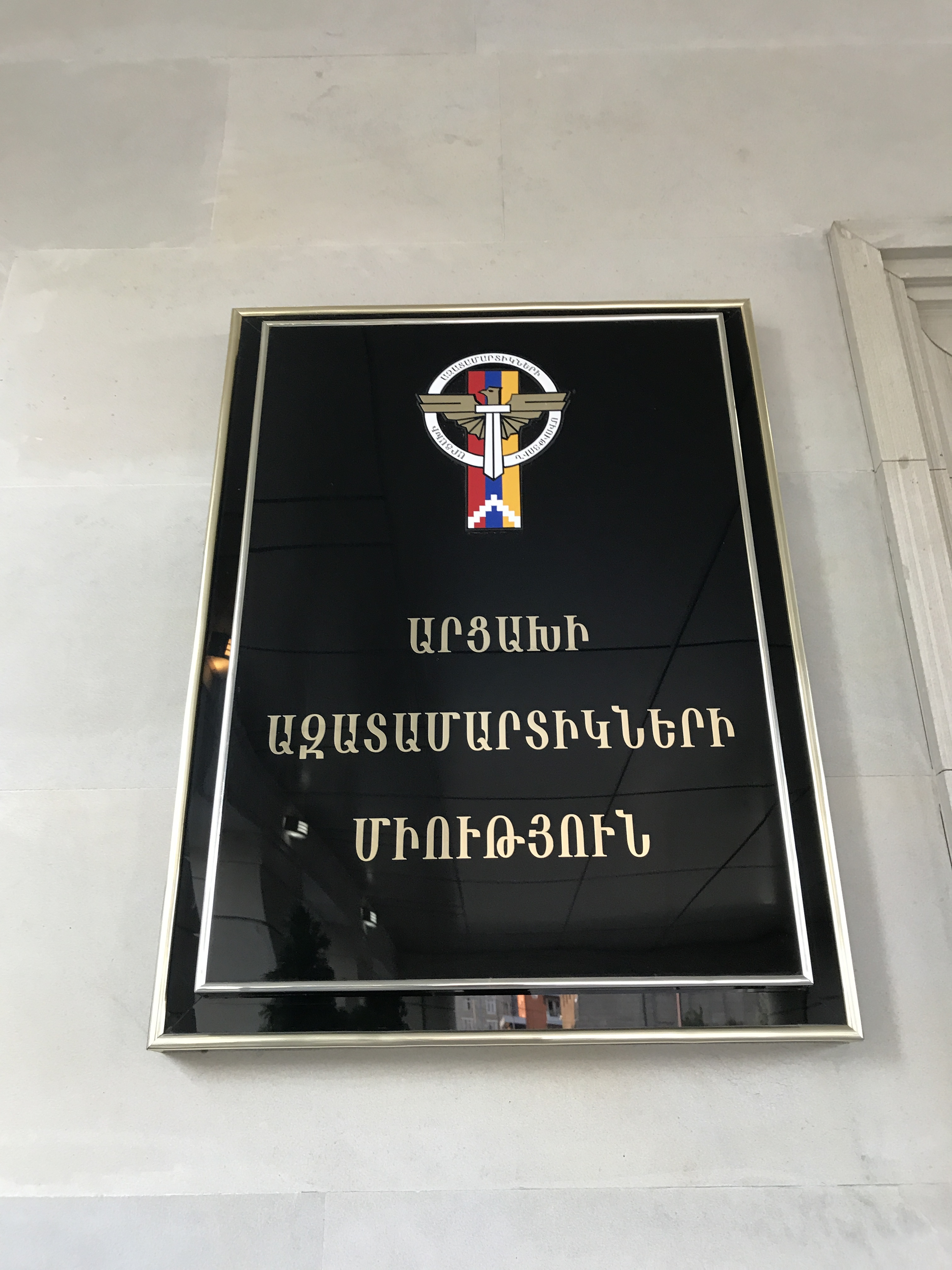
- Founded: 23 February 2000
- Dissolved: 2023
- Headquarters: Stepanakert
- Key people: Major General Samvel Karapetyan (union president)
- Affiliations: Artsakh Defence Army
- Website: Official Website

The Artsakh Freedom Fighters Union (Armenian: Արցախի ազատամարտիկների միություն) was a military veterans organization of the Artsakh Defence Army. It served as an organization that honours Soviet/Armenian veterans of war, whether they hailed from Armenia or the de facto Republic of Artsakh (Republic of Nagorno-Karabakh). It was established on 23 February (the traditional Defender of the Fatherland Day holiday) in the year 2000. On Shushi Liberation Day in 2013, a newly erected building for the union was opened on Renaissance Square in Stepanakert (Khankendi). On 2 April 2016, an independent battalion was formed adjacent to the union building. Its community association was operating in 181 communities of Artsakh. The union had a youth wing called Hayrenyats Pashtpan (Motherland Defender), which was established in April 2006. In 2007, personnel of the union took part in the Liberation Day military parade for the first time. The main purpose was to render financial assistance to the families of dead soldiers and living veterans of the Second World War, the First Nagorno-Karabakh War and the 2016 Nagorno-Karabakh conflict.

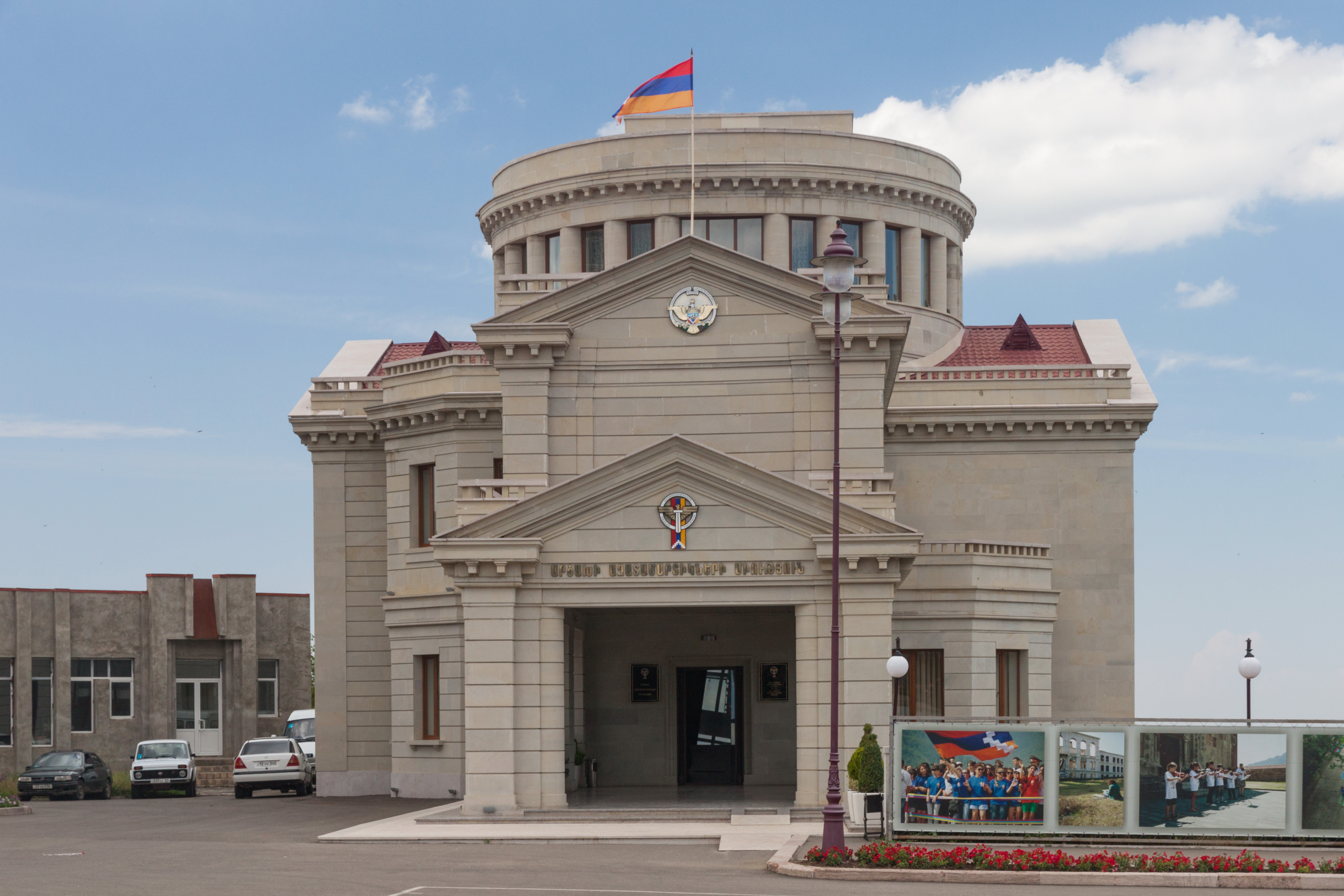
Artsakh Freedom Fighters Union building on Renaissance Square in 2014.

The organization was dissolved along with all other Artsakhi institutions, when the de facto Republic of Artsakh was dissolved, after the Azerbaijani offensive in Artsakh (Nagorno-Karabakh) on 19–20 September 2023, that led to the fall of Artsakh.

In early March 2024, Azerbaijani authorities demolished the Artsakh Freedom Fighters Union building.

== See also ==
- Artsakh Defence Army
- Military history of the Republic of Artsakh
