= Shushi Liberation Day =

Public holiday

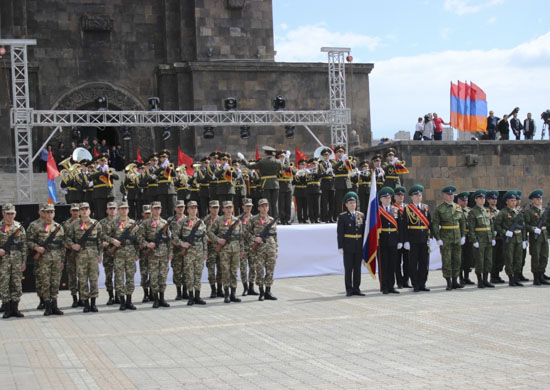
A national ceremony at the Mother Armenia monument.

Shushi Liberation Day (Armenian: Շուշիի ազատագրման օրը, romanized: Shushii azatagrman ory) is a national holiday celebrated in Armenia and formerly in the self-proclaimed Republic of Artsakh. It is commemorated on both 8 and 9 May as a way to celebrate the anniversary of the Capture of Shushi and the Siege of Stepanakert (referred to commonly by Armenians as the Liberation of Shushi) from Azerbaijani forces in 1992. Being both former Soviet republics, the holiday also commemorates the traditional Victory Day celebrations on 9 May, commemorating the surrender of Nazi Germany at the end of the Great Patriotic War in 1945. The holiday serves as the official holiday of the Artsakh Defense Army, which was established on this day.

== Commemorations ==
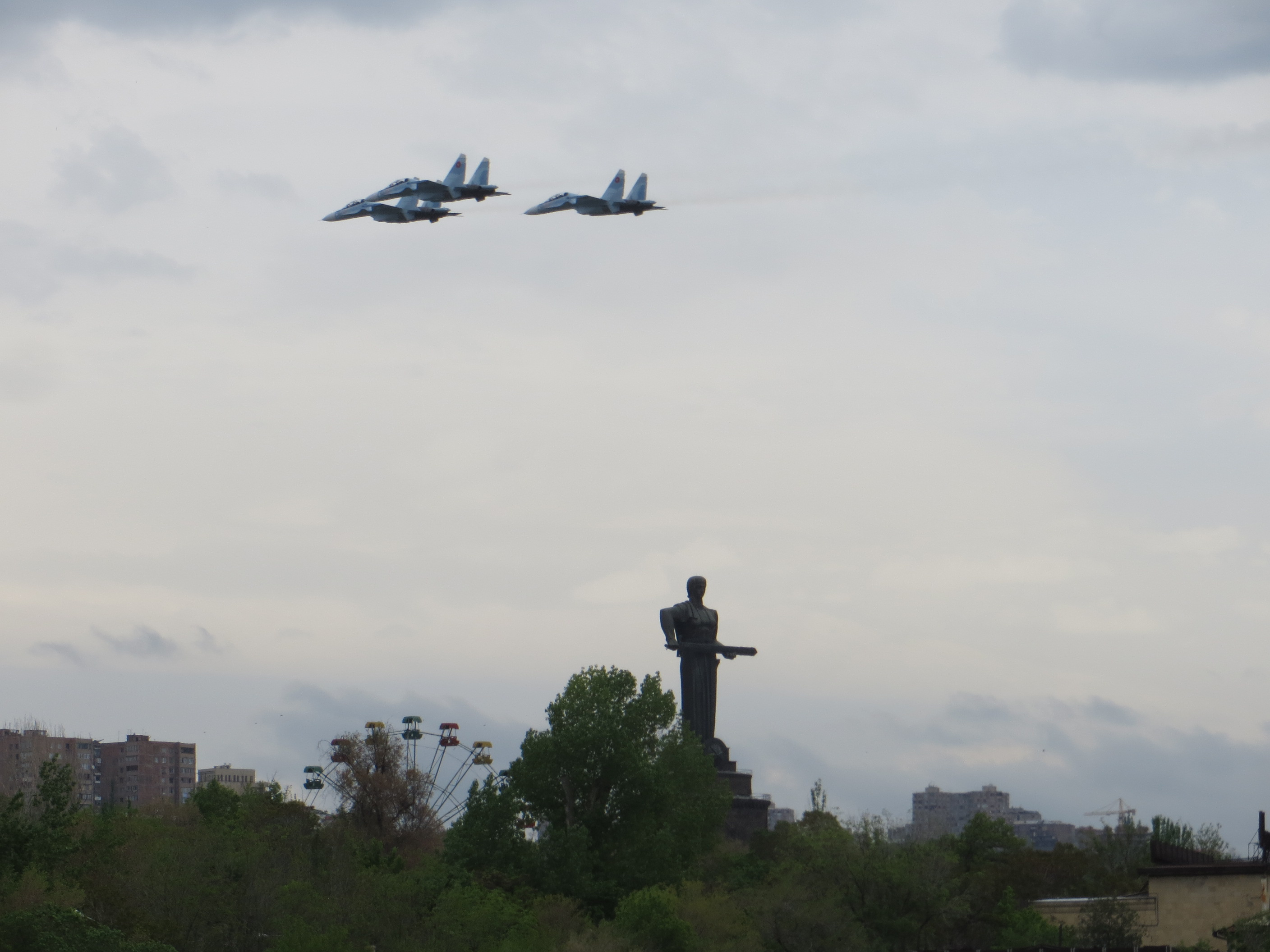
The 2020 flypast.

Many officials and veterans lay wreaths at the Tomb of the Unknown Soldier in Yerevan's Victory Park and the Yerablur. Greetings are given by the President of Armenia and the President of Artsakh.

=== 2005 celebrations ===
The 2005 celebrations marked the 60th anniversary of the war. President Robert Kocharyan was in Moscow during the celebrations to attend the Victory Day Parade on Red Square.

=== 2007 celebrations ===
The 2007 celebrations marked the fifteenth anniversary of the town's capture. The festivities included a cross-country marathon organized by the youth wing of the Armenian Revolutionary Federation that began inside Armenia and ended in Shushi on the eve of 9 May. In Armenia, the then Prime Minister Serzh Sargsyan inaugurated a square named after Shushi.

=== 2020 celebrations ===
The 2020 celebrations in honor of the 28th anniversary and the 75th anniversary were cancelled by order of Prime Minister Nikol Pashinyan due to the COVID-19 pandemic. A fly past of the Armenian Air Force and the Russian 102nd Military Base was held at the Mother Armenia monument. In a ceremony that preceded the parade, 6 veterans of war were driven to the airport, where they handed the banners of 6 Armenian Red Army regiments to the pilots participating in the flypast. President Armen Sarkissian hosted the war leader Arkady Ter-Tadevosyan at his residence, saying that he is "the symbol of Shushi Liberation Day".

=== 2021 celebrations ===
The 2021 celebrations were the first to not have been held in Shushi. On 8 May, Arkady Ter-Tadevosyan, who died earlier that year, was posthumously named National Hero of Armenia. Prime Minister Pashinyan also awarded Ter-Tadevosyan with the Order of the Motherland, which he handed over to his son Hayk Ter-Tadevosyan.

Since the loss of the city during the Second Nagorno-Karabakh War in the Battle of Shusha, there were questions in Armenian society over the continued celebration of the holiday. Former Prime Minister of Artsakh Anushavan Danielyan wrote in an op-ed that celebrating the holiday "with a capitulator who surrendered Shushi", referring to Prime Minister Pashinyan, is "tantamount to double humiliation of our people." Hayastani Hanrapetutyun, the official government newspaper, argued in favor of continuing the tradition. MP Sasun Mikayelyan speculated that clashes could occur should Pashinyan arrive at Yerablur Military Pantheon on the day of liberation of Shushi. In his congratulatory message on the holiday, Pashinyan declared that although the nation "mourn the captivity of Shushi", Armenians must celebrate the holiday as it "is one of the glorious chapters in Armenia’s modern history".

== Military parade ==
The Liberation Day Parade is the military parade in Stepanakert that marks the anniversary of the capture, held on 9 May. It is organized by the Ministry of Defence and usually lasts an hour and 45 minutes. The parade normally takes place every five years on Renaissance Square and it showcases the defense capability of the defense army. Over the years the parade was fitted to resemble the quinquennial Independence Day parade in Yerevan. The following parades have historically been held:

- 1995 - The first parade in honor of the holiday was held in 1995, which celebrated the 3rd anniversary of both holidays. The parade also coincided with the golden jubilee (50th anniversary) of the Great Patriotic War, which was celebrated with military parades in all former Soviet republics (excluding the Baltic states). The commander of the parade was Deputy Commander of the NKR Army Major-General Seyran Ohanyan while the inspector was Defence minister Samvel Babayan. All orders and speeches during the parade were notably given in Russian instead of the Armenian language. Troops from all the Defense Districts and separate subdivisions of the Defense Army passed through the central square.
- 1997 - This parade celebrated the 5th anniversary of the liberation and the 52nd anniversary of the victory.
- 2007 - The 2007 parade was attended by Armenian President Kocharian and Artsakh President Arkady Ghukasian. President Ghukasian in particular, honored the anniversary of the Great Patriotic War by noting that Armenians appreciate the contribution of their ancestors who took part in both the Second World War and the Nagorno-Karabakh War. Ghukasyan also reiterated the point that the citizens of the republic would have the final say over their future in peace talks with Azerbaijan. The parade was commanded by the Colonel General Seyran Ohanyan and his deputy Major General Movses Hakobyan. It took place with the participation of troops and troops, as well as with the participation of a large number of foreign guests (from the United States, France, Russia and other countries). Contingents included those from the Kristapor Ivanyan Military College, veterans of the Great Patriotic War, and members of the Artsakh Freedom Fighters Union.
- 2012 - Celebrated the 20th anniversary of the liberation and the 67th anniversary of the victory in the Great Patriotic War. The Band of the General Staff of the Armed Forces of Armenia (led by Colonel Armen Poghosyan) and the Honour Guard Battalion of the Armenian Ministry of Defense (led by Lieutenant Colonel Sokrat Vardanyan) took part in the parade, with the band playing Azat u ankakh Artsakh (the national anthem) in the middle of the parade and the guards performing an exhibition drill. The parade was the first to use Nissan Patrol SUVs as inspection vehicles for the Minister of Defense and the parade commander.
- 2017 - The silver jubilee parade also was held on the occasion of the 72nd anniversary of the victory. In addition, a display of weapons is held at Revival Square prior to the start of the parade. The Armenian delegation was led by President Serzh Sargsyan and Defense Minister Vigen Sargsyan.

=== Ceremonial music usually played during the parade ===
- Presidential Fanfare
- Signal
- Zangezur Stage
- March of the Preobrazhensky Regiment
- Jubilee Slow March "25 Years of the Red Army"
- March "Defile"
- Military March No. 1
- Military March No. 2
- Festive Yerevan March
- Our name is Armenian Army
- Den Pobedy
- March "Parade"
- March of the Pilots
- Capital March
- Erebouni

== Yerkrapah Day ==
Yerkrapah Day (Armenian: Երկրապահի օր) is a professional holiday for all members of Yerkrapah, celebrated annually on Shushi Liberation Day. It honours all members of the Yerkrapah Volunteer Union, which was founded by Vazgen Sargsyan and consists of veterans of the armed forces. The official status of Yerkrapah Day was conceived after the entry of a law which President Robert Kocharyan signed on 6 January 2001 and which the Parliament of Armenia approved on 24 July that year.

== See also ==
- Defender of the Fatherland Day
- Independence Day (Armenia)
- Liberation Day (Ukraine)
- Victory Day (Azerbaijan)
- Victory in Europe Day
