= Alisa Kurdian =

Armenian cinematographer (1943–2026)

Alisa Kurdian (Armenian: Ալիսա Քյուրդիան; 8 October 1943 – 9 March 2026) was an Armenian cinematographer.

From 1961 to 1964 she studied at the Yerevan Polytechnic Institute, and in 1968 she trained at the Soyuzmultfilm film studio in Moscow. Since 1965 she worked at the Hayfilm film studio.

Kurdian died on 9 March 2026, at the age of 82.

== Awards ==
- Honored Artist of Armenia (2010)
