= Sasun Mikayelyan =

Armenian politician

Sasun Nikoli Mikayelyan
- Սասուն Միքայելյան
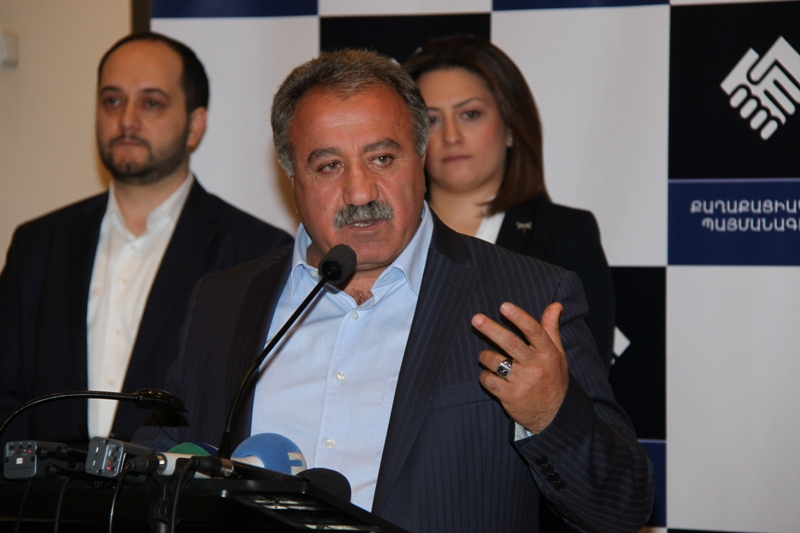

Member of the National Assembly of Armenia
- Parliamentary group: Way Out Alliance

Personal details
- Born: November 7, 1957 (age 68) Hrazdan, Armenian SSR, Soviet Union
- Party: Civil Contract
- Education: Armenian National Agrarian University
- Occupation: economist

Sasun Nikoli Mikayelyan (Armenian: Սասուն Միքայելյան; born 7 November 1957) is an Armenian politician and current member of the Armenian National Assembly. He is a founding member of the Civil Contract Party. During the 2020 Nagorno-Karabakh conflict he was injured in the frontline by shrapnel in the legs.
