= Gagik Tadevosyan =

Armenian politician (1950–2024)

Member of the National Assembly of Armenia
- In office 5 July 1995 – 12 June 2003

Personal details
- Born: 29 June 1950 Yerevan, Armenian SSR, USSR
- Died: 13 January 2024 (aged 73)
- Party: HKK
- Education: National Polytechnic University of Armenia
- Occupation: Engineer

Gagik Tadevosyan (Armenian: Գագիկ Թադևոսյան; 29 June 1950 – 13 January 2024) was an Armenian engineer and politician. A member of the Armenian Communist Party, he served in the National Assembly from 1995 to 2003.

Tadevosyan died on 13 January 2024, at the age of 73.
