= Independence Day (Armenia) =

Public holiday in Armenia

Independence Day Armenian: Հայաստանի անկախության օր
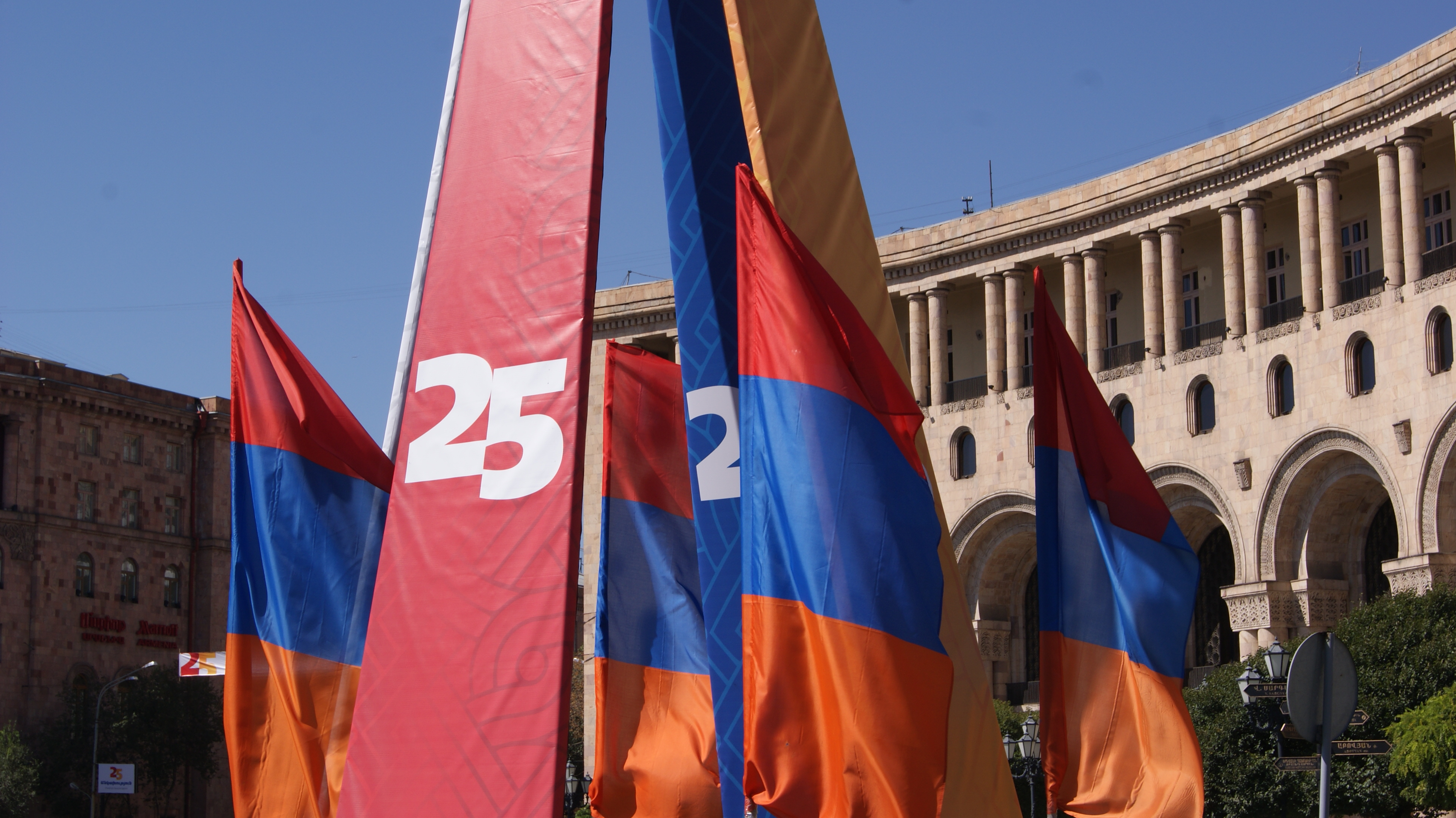
- Decorations marking the 25th anniversary of Armenia's independence, 2016
- Observed by: Armenia; Armenian diaspora
- Type: State
- Significance: The day the Armenian SSR voted in a referendum in 1991 to gain and restore independence from the Soviet Union.
- Celebrations: fireworks, concerts, military parades (from 1996 to 2016)
- Date: September 21
- Next time: 21 September 2026
- Frequency: annual
- Related to: Independence of Armenia from Soviet Union

The Independence Day of Armenia (Armenian: Հայաստանի անկախության օր) is one of the main national and state holidays of Armenia, celebrated annually on September 21 and dedicated to the restoration of Armenia's independence from the Soviet Union.

Independence Day symbolizes the revival of Armenian statehood, which was interrupted by the fall of the First Republic and the establishment of Soviet rule in 1920.

== History ==
On August 23, 1990, Supreme Council adopted the Declaration of State Sovereignty of Armenia proclaiming the Armenian SSR abolished and the establishment of the Republic of Armenia. Armenia refused to sign the New Union Treaty. After the failed August putsch, the people of Armenia voted in a referendum to proclaim independence from the Soviet Union on September 21, 1991. Levon Ter-Petrosyan was elected the first president of Armenia in November 1991. On December 21, 1991, Armenia joined the Commonwealth of Independent States (CIS). Armenia gained independence formally on December 26 in connection with the dissolution of the USSR.

This is the second declaration of independence in modern Armenian history, the first having occurred on May 28, 1918, which led to the formation of the First Republic of Armenia. This First Armenian Republic was short-lived due to its partition by the Soviet Russia and Turkish Nationalist forces in late 1920.

== Armenian Celebratory events ==
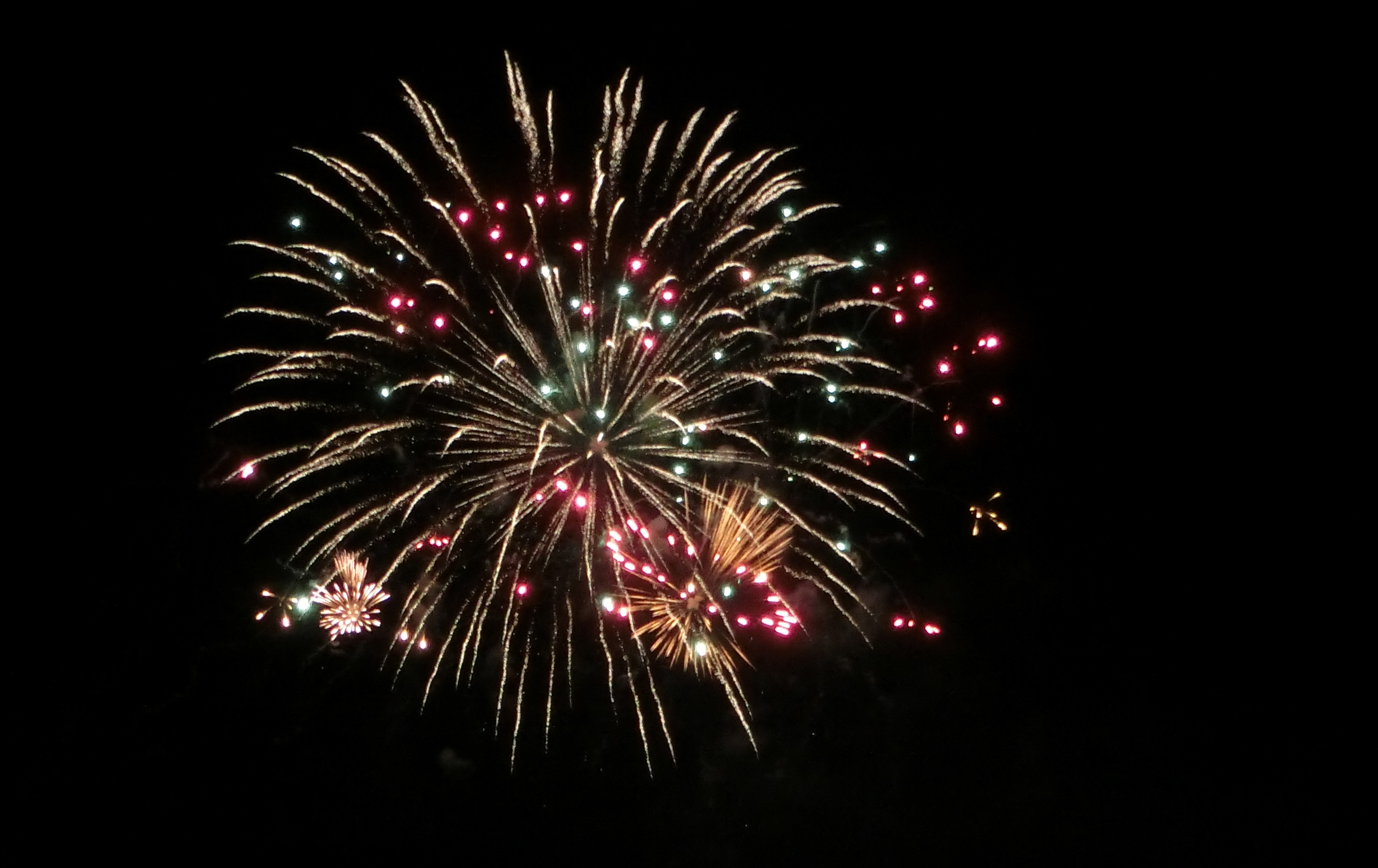
Fireworks in Republic Square

On Independence Day, ceremonies are held in Yerevan and other cities with the participation of the country's leadership, including speeches by the president and prime minister and flower-laying ceremonies at monuments to national heroes and memorials. From 1996 to 2016, military parades were held in Yerevan's Republic Square during anniversary years, with the participation of units of the Armed Forces of Armenia, as well as representatives of foreign armies.

The cultural program includes concerts, exhibitions and festivals dedicated to Armenian history, art and traditions. In the evening, fireworks and light shows are held in the capital and major cities.

=== Independence Day military parade ===
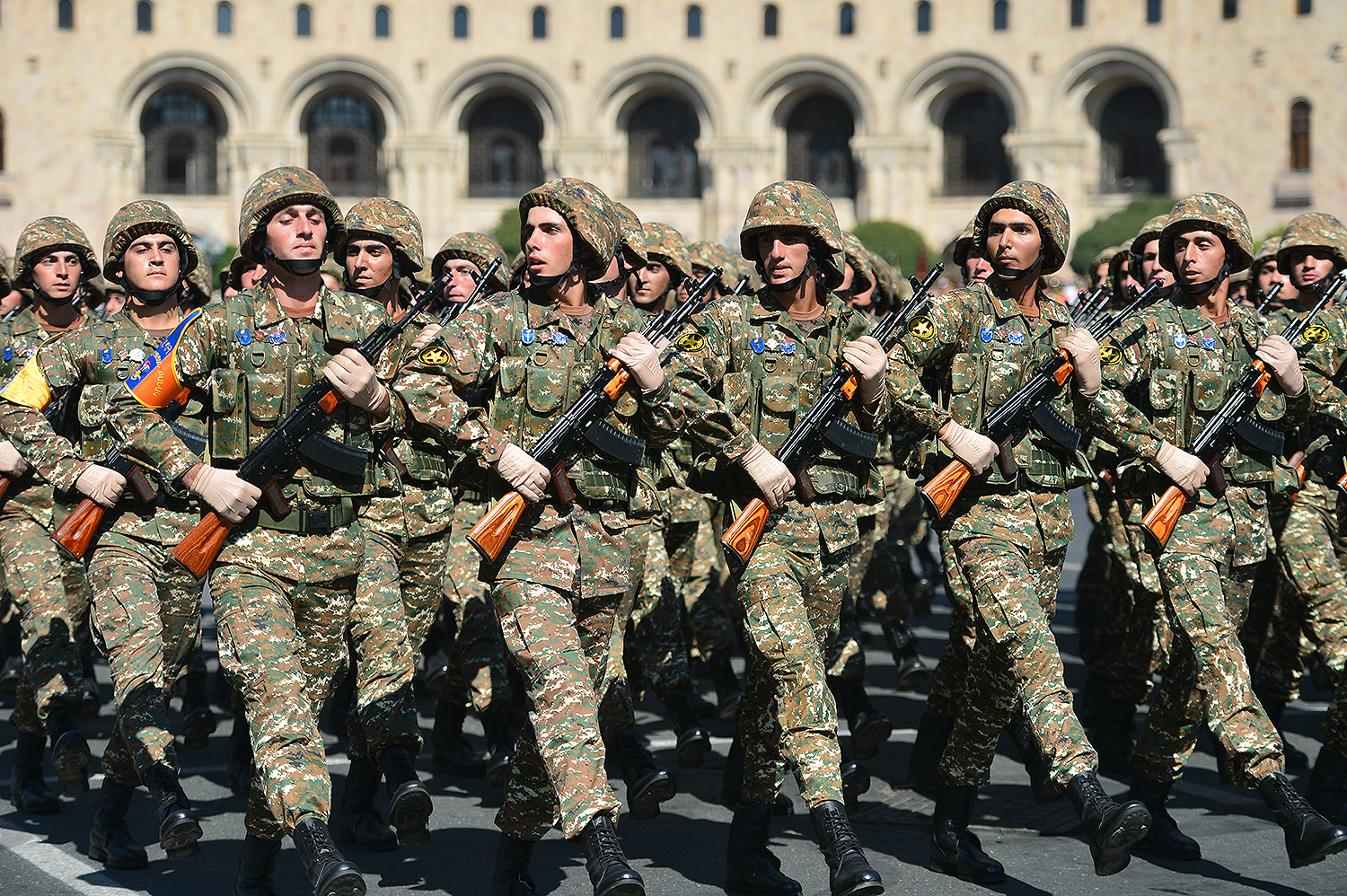
Soldiers of the Armed Forces of Armenia marching in the 2016 Independence Day military parade

The military parade was held in Yerevan, on Republic Square, in selected years from 1996 to 2016, as part of the Independence Day anniversary celebrations.

The parade was accompanied by the performance of the national anthem, a ceremonial raising of the national flag, and official addresses delivered by members of the country's highest leadership.

It was attended by units of the Armed Forces of Armenia, including the ground forces, air force, border troops, as well as cadets from military academies. Accompanied by a military orchestra, they marched in front of the podium, where the president, prime minister, parliamentary representatives, and foreign dignitaries were present. The parade featured displays of modern military equipment, including armored personnel carriers, artillery mounts, anti-aircraft warfare, and unmanned aerial vehicles.

The 5th anniversary parade in 1996 It coincided with the 1996 Armenian presidential election, which would take place the day after. The opposition charged President Levon Ter-Petrosyan, who was in attendance, with putting on a show of force to his opposition and particularly supporters of his opponent Vazgen Manukyan. The 2006 parade marked the first time a parade speech was given by the President of Armenia. In 2011, a group representing the Russian Army's 102nd Military Base in Armenia took part in the parade alongside Armenian troops for the first time.

The 25th anniversary parade in 2016 was the biggest celebration in Armenia's history. Among the new participants were students of Small Mher School and the youth wing of the Yerkrapah.The parade also saw the introduction of the posting of the Flag of Armenia, the flag of the Ministry of Defence, and the flag of King Ashot II the Iron before the parade proceedings by a flag-bearing group was headed by Major-General Ishkhan Matosyan. Also before the start of the military parade, was the head of the military clergy, Bishop Vrtanes Abrahamyan, reading the "Lord's Prayer".

=== Diaspora celebrations ===
Independence day celebrations are also held in diaspora countries such as Russia, Lebanon and the United States. In the United States specifically, Armenian-American youth organizations hold rallies and cultural programs on this day. The Armenian Independence Day Festival in Los Angeles's Little Armenia was established in 1998, attracting around 5,000 spectators on Independence Day. In 2019, Prime Minister Pashinyan visited the city during the Independence Day celebrations, the first visit of its kind. On the holiday in 2020, the personal star of singer Arman Hovhannisyan was installed on the Walk of Fame in Las Vegas. That same year in Lebanon, Aram I (head of the Catholicosate of the Great House of Cilicia) led the Divine Liturgy and ceremonial flag blessing in Antelias. Also on the holiday in 2020, the Mayor of Washington, D.C., Muriel Bowser proclaimed September the 21st as "Armenian Independence Day" in the United States capital city.

=== Controversy with some celebrations ===
In early September 2021, the government announced plans for celebrations of the 30th anniversary independence on a large scale. These plans were criticized by the public, with many, including family members of soldiers killed in the 44-day war, deeming it as inappropriate considering Armenia's defeat. Many opposed to these plans proposed a gathering at Yerablur on September 21.

== International places lit in Armenian symbols on Independence Day ==
=== Flag of Armenia ===
- Niagara Falls, Canada (2020)
- Ottawa City Hall, Canada (2020)
- Burj Khalifa, Dubai, United Arab Emirates (2020)
- Tbilisi TV Broadcasting Tower, Georgia (2020)
- Abu Dhabi National Oil Company Tower, United Arab Emirates (2020)
- Jack House Ukraine, Ukraine (2020)
- Nur-Sultan City Centre, Kazakhstan (2020)
- Cafe't Wapen van Drenthe, Assen, Netherlands (2020)
- De Pijp, Groningen, Netherlands (2020)
- Radisson Montevideo Victoria Plaza Hotel, Uruguay (2020)
- Argentina National Flag Memorial, Argentina (2020)
- Bicentennial Lighthouse, Argentina (2020)
- Galileo Galilei Planetarium, Argentina (2020)
- Cairo Tower, Egypt (2021)
- International Gateway Bridge, Long Beach, California, United States (2024 & 2025)
- Azadi Tower ('Freedom Tower'), Iran (2025)

=== Other ===
- Christ the Redeemer, Brazil (lit with the Independence flag and Armenian alphabet, 2020)

=== Google Doodle ===
Google Doodle annually dedicates a Doodle to celebrate Armenian Independence Day, along with a differing description of the festivities per year:

"On Independence Day, Armenians across the country gather with friends and family to celebrate a day of national pride. Each year, the main festivities occur in a different city to honor the nation’s diverse regions and people. However, an annual grand parade with impressive floats and traditional kochari dancers takes place in Yerevan’s Republic Square—a notable site known for its architecture and history." -- Google Doodle 2025

- Google Doodle (the September 21, 2015, Google Doodle was dedicated to Armenia's Independence Day, illustrated in the Doodle artwork is Armenia's red-blue-and-orange flag)
- Google Doodle (the September 21, 2016, a special Google Doodle was dedicated to the 25th Anniversary of Armenia's Independence Day, illustrated in the Doodle artwork is Armenia's Yerevan Opera Theatre (Armenian National Academic Theatre of Opera and Ballet)
- Google Doodle (the September 21, 2018, Google Doodle was dedicated to Armenia's Independence Day, illustrated in the Doodle artwork is Armenia's red-blue-and-orange flag)
- Google Doodle (the September 21, 2019, Google Doodle was dedicated to Armenia's Independence Day, illustrated in the Doodle artwork is Armenia's red-blue-and-orange flag)
- Google Doodle (the September 21, 2020, Google Doodle was dedicated to Armenia's Independence Day, illustrated in the Doodle artwork is Armenia's red-blue-and-orange flag)
- Google Doodle (the September 21, 2021, Google Doodle was dedicated to Armenia's Independence Day, illustrated in the Doodle artwork is Armenia's red-blue-and-orange flag)
- Google Doodle (the September 21, 2022, Google Doodle was dedicated to Armenia's Independence Day, illustrated in the Doodle artwork is Armenia's red-blue-and-orange flag)
- Google Doodle (the September 21, 2023, Google Doodle was dedicated to Armenia's Independence Day, illustrated in the Doodle artwork is Armenia's red-blue-and-orange flag)
- Google Doodle (the September 21, 2024, Google Doodle was dedicated to Armenia's Independence Day, illustrated in the Doodle artwork is Armenia's red-blue-and-orange flag)
- Google Doodle (the September 21, 2025, Google Doodle was dedicated to Armenia's Independence Day, illustrated in the Doodle artwork is Armenia's red-blue-and-orange flag)

== See also ==
- List of national independence days
- Public holidays in Armenia
- Shushi Liberation Day
