= Army Day (Armenia) =

Public holiday in Armenia

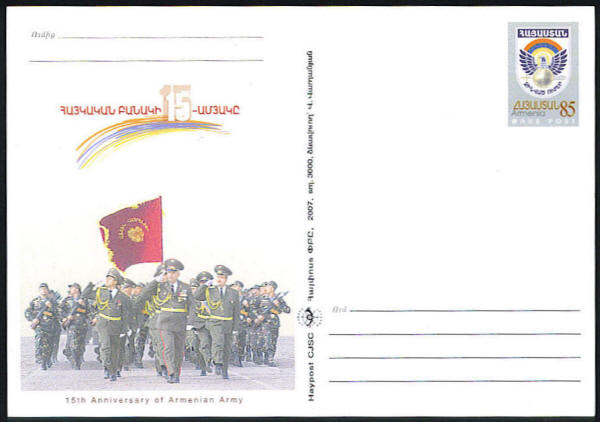
- Postcard and a stamp in honor of the 15th anniversary of the Armenian Armed Forces.
- Official name: Բանակի օր
- Also called: Armenian Armed Forces Day
- Observed by: Armenia
- Type: National
- Significance: Celebrates the founding of the Armenian Armed Forces
- Celebrations: State ceremonies
- Date: 28 January
- Next time: 28 January 2026
- Frequency: Annual

Army Day (Armenian: Բանակի օր) is a public holiday in Armenia and previously also in the Republic of Artsakh celebrated on 28 January. It honors the troops of the Armed Forces of Armenia.

== Background ==
In 1922, the soldiers stationed in the Armenian Soviet Socialist Republic, as well as all units of the Soviet Army began to celebrate Defender of the Fatherland Day on 23 February, together with the entire Soviet Union. The Armed Forces of Armenia was formally established on 28 January 1992, by decree of President of Armenia Levon Ter-Petrosyan, several months after declaration of independence from the Soviet Union.

== Commemorations ==
Army Day was first celebrated in 2001, same year when the President of Armenia, Robert Kocharyan, signed Army Day into law as an official holiday and a non-working day. Usually officials visit Yerablur memorial to pay homage to the fallen Armenian soldiers who lost their life defending the homeland. Flowers are laid at the graves of notable military leaders such as, Vazgen Sargsyan and Andranik Ozanyan. The President of Armenia, the Catholicos of All Armenians, the Chief of the General Staff and the Defence minister of Armenia also attend the celebrations. In the Republic of Artsakh, 28 January is known as Homeland Defender's Day in the Artsakh Defence Army.

On the Army's 20th anniversary in 2012, the Holy Cross of King Ashot II the Iron was proclaimed as the "Guardian of the Armenian Army".

During the Army Day celebrations in 2019, the village of Rind in the Vayots Dzor Province unveiled and raised the largest known Armenian Flag in the country. In 2021, a rally was held on Republic Square in Yerevan to demand the resignation of Prime Minister Nikol Pashinyan over the 2020 Nagorno-Karabakh war.
