= Armenian Genocide Remembrance Day =

Public holiday celebrating in 24 April

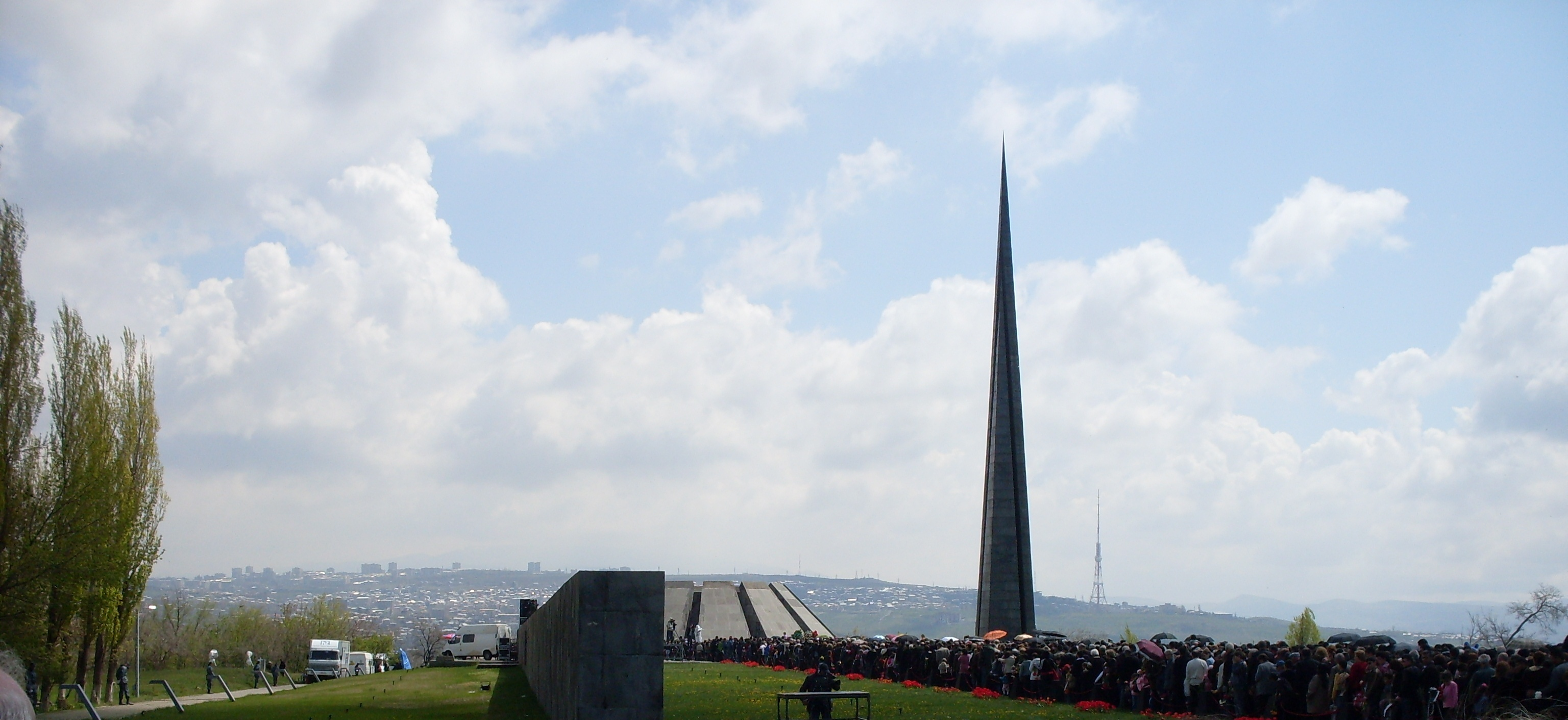
- Also called: Armenian Genocide Memorial Day
- Observed by: Armenia; Argentina; California; Canada; France
- Type: National
- Significance: Commemoration of the Armenian genocide
- Date: 24 April
- Frequency: Annual

Armenian Genocide Remembrance Day (Armenian: Մեծ Եղեռնի զոհերի հիշատակի օր, romanized: Mets Yegherrni zoheri hishataki), also known as Armenian Genocide Memorial Day, is a public holiday in Armenia and the former Republic of Artsakh (before the expulsion of its Armenian population) and is observed by the Armenian diaspora on 24 April. It is held annually to commemorate the victims of the Armenian genocide of 1915, a series of massacres and starvation of 1.5 million Armenians by the Ottomans. In Yerevan, the capital of Armenia, hundreds of thousands of people walk to the Tsitsernakaberd Genocide Memorial to lay flowers at the eternal flame. This day is also called "Armenian Martyrs Day".

== History ==
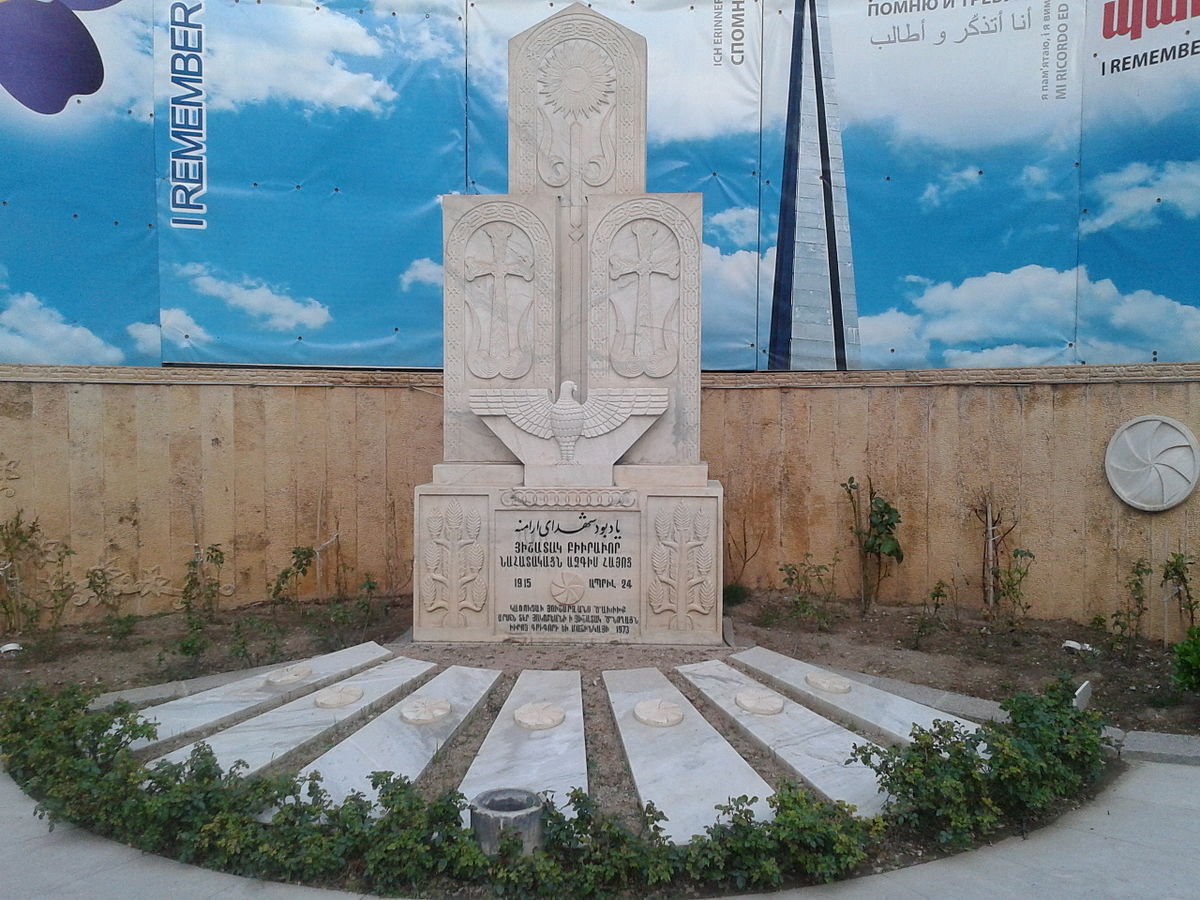
Genocide memorial in Saint Sarkis Cathedral, Tehran

The date 24 April commemorates the deportation of Armenian intellectuals on 24 April 1915 from Constantinople (present-day Istanbul). The first commemoration, organised by a group of Armenian Genocide survivors, was held in Istanbul in 1919 at the local St. Trinity Armenian church. Many prominent figures in the Armenian community participated in the commemoration. Following this event, the date became the annual day of remembrance for the Armenian Genocide.

On April 24, 1965, Uruguay became the First Nation in the world to declare a "Day of Remembrance for the Armenian Martyrs".

The 1965 Yerevan demonstrations saw 100,000 demonstrators come onto the streets of the capital of the Armenian Soviet Socialist Republic on 24 April to commemorate the 50th anniversary of the start of the Ottoman genocide.

On 9 April 1975, the US House of Representatives passed Joint Resolution 148 designating 24 April as a "National Day of Remembrance of Man's Inhumanity to Man". The Resolution commemorated victims of genocide, especially those of Armenian ancestry who succumbed to the genocide perpetrated in 1915. The resolution however failed to pass in the U.S. Senate Judiciary Committee due to President Gerald R. Ford's strong opposition to what he saw as a threat to the country's strategic alliance with Turkey.

In 1988, Soviet Armenia formally adopted 24 April as a public day of commemoration. In 1997 in the US, the California State Assembly declared 24 April as a "Day of Remembrance for the Armenian Genocide of 1915–1923, and for the victims of the Sumgait Pogroms of 1988 and Baku Riots of 1990".

In 2007, Argentina passed National Law 26199, designating 24 April as the "Day of Action for Tolerance and Respect Among Peoples", in which Armenian Argentines are excused from work. In 2015, the House of Commons of Canada unanimously passed Motion M-587, proposed by Brad Butt, marking April to be Genocide Remembrance, Condemnation and Prevention Month, and designating 24 April as Armenian Genocide Memorial Day.

In 2019, France marked its first national commemoration of the genocide, with French president Emmanuel Macron declaring 24 April "a national day of remembrance of the Armenian genocide", fulfilling a campaign pledge. In 2021, US President Joe Biden recognized the genocide on 24 April, also fulfilling a campaign pledge. On 14 May 2024, the Chamber of Representatives of Uruguay unanimously approved a bill that declares 24 April of each year as "Armenian Genocide Remembrance Day".

In 2025, the Los Angeles County of California announced 24 April 24, 2025, as "Armenian Genocide Remembrance Day". Californian Governor Gavin Newsom issued a statement recognizing the day as Remembrance of the Armenian Genocide.

On 24 April 2026, marking the 111th anniversary, a French governmental delegation including Alice Rufo, Minister Delegate for the Armed Forces, and Aurore Bergé, Minister for Equality, visited the Tsitsernakaberd memorial in Yerevan to reaffirm bilateral cooperation. President Emmanuel Macron also issued an official statement emphasizing the "indissoluble bond" between France and Armenia.

== See also ==
- 100th anniversary of the Armenian genocide
- Armenian genocide denial
- Armenian genocide recognition
- "I Apologize" campaign
- National Sorry Day
- Truth and reconciliation commission
- Vergangenheitsbewältigung
