= 2017 in Armenia =

- Decades: 1990s; 2000s; 2010s; 2020s
- See also: Other events of 2017; List of years in Armenia

The following lists events in the year 2017 in Armenia.

== Incumbents ==
- President: Serzh Sargsyan
- Prime Minister: Karen Karapetyan
- Speaker: Galust Sahakyan (until 18 May), Ara Babloyan (from 18 May)

== Events ==
=== February ===
- 27 February - The EU and Armenia have agreed to a new pact tightening political ties 3 years after rejection by Armenia.

=== April ===
- 2 April - Voters go to the polls to vote in the parliamentary election, which is alleged to be tainted by vote-buying.
- 3 April – Karen Karapetyan and the Republicans win the 2017 parliamentary election.

=== August ===
- 31 August – Visa requirements for Japanese citizens are waived.

=== October ===
- 20 October – Bahá’u’lláh's - Baha'i faith's founder's Bicentenary

== Deaths ==
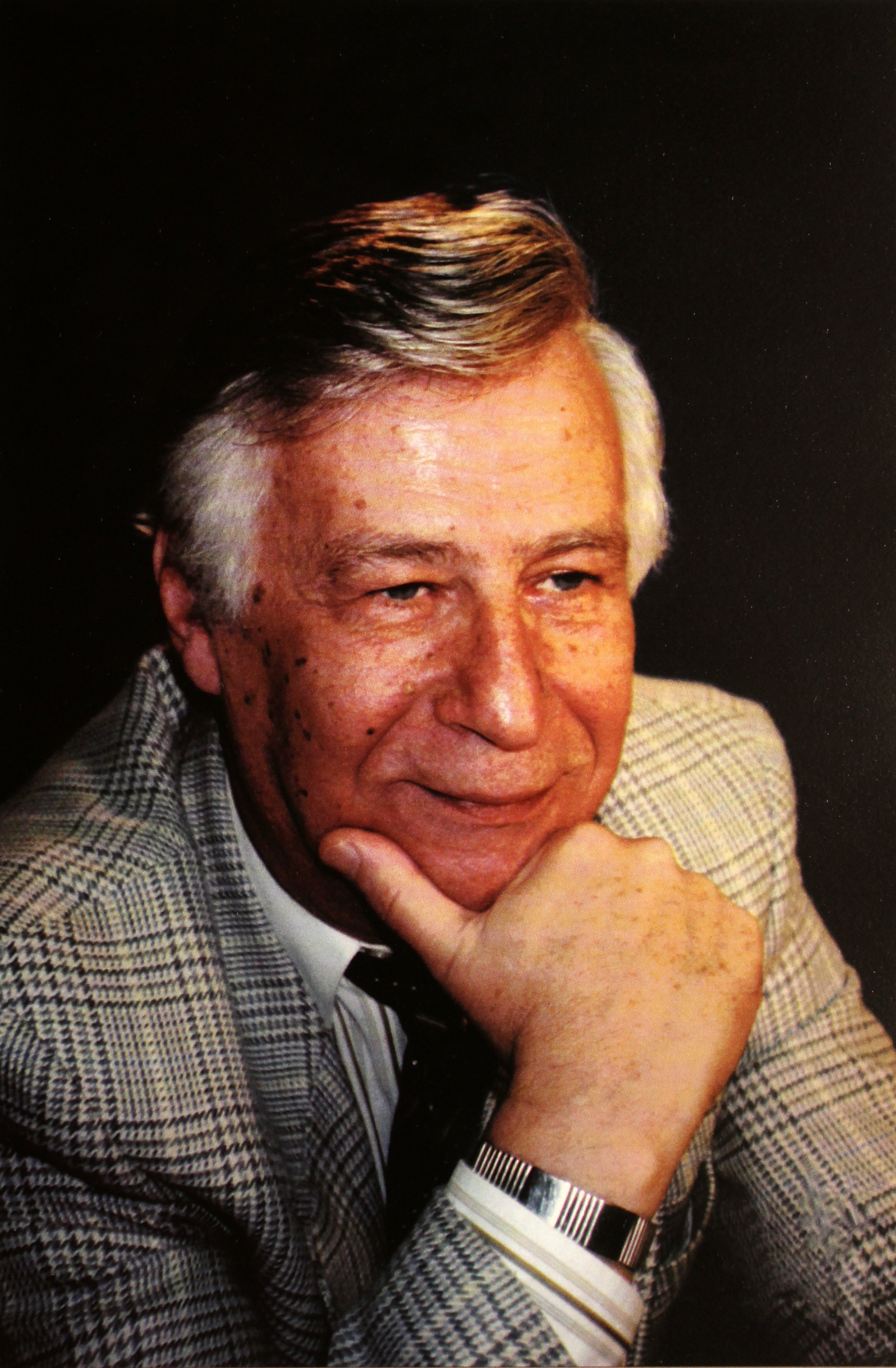
Perch Zeytuntsyan

- 16 February – Isahak Isahakyan, banker (b. 1933).
- 21 August – Perch Zeytuntsyan, playwright and screenwriter, government minister (b. 1938).
