= 2020 in Armenia =

- Decades: 2000s; 2010s; 2020s
- See also: Other events of 2020; List of years in Armenia

Events from the year 2020 in Armenia.

== Incumbents ==
- President: Armen Sarkissian
- Prime Minister: Nikol Pashinyan
- Speaker: Ararat Mirzoyan

== Events ==
- March 1 - 1st case of COVID-19 in Armenia
- March 16 - 2020 Armenian constitutional referendum postponed
- March 18 - 444 people in quarantine at the Golden Palace Hotel of Tsaghkadzor and the Monte Melkonian Military College of Dilijan.
- March 29 - Confirmed cases rise to 424
- April 5 - Original planned date of the 2020 Armenian constitutional referendum
- July 12-15 - July 2020 Armenian–Azerbaijani clashes
- September 27-November 10 - The Second Nagorno-Karabakh war.
- October 8 - Deaths reported to be caused by coronavirus reach over 1,000.
- November 6 - COVID-19 cases reach over 100,000.
- November 10 - 2020 Armenian protests

== Deaths ==
- July 20 - Boka, singer and songwriter (b. 1949)
- October 28 - Gurgen Egiazaryan, politician and civil servant (b. 1948)
- November 14 - Armen Dzhigarkhanyan, Russian-Armenian actor (b. 1935)
- November 19 -
  - Sebouh Chouldjian, Turkish-born Armenian Apostolic prelate, Archbishop of Gougark (since 1996) (b. 1959)
  - Manvel Grigoryan, military officer and politician, Deputy (2012–2018) (b. 1957)
- November 20 - Rita Sargsyan, Armenian socialite, First Lady (2008–2018) (b. 1962)
