= 2015 in Armenia =

- Decades: 1990s; 2000s; 2010s; 2020s
- See also: Other events of 2015; List of years in Armenia

The following lists events that happened during 2015 in Armenia.

== Incumbents ==
- President: Serzh Sargsyan
- Prime Minister: Hovik Abrahamyan
- Speaker: Galust Sahakyan

== Events ==
=== January ===
- January 1 – Armenia joins the Eurasian Economic Union.
- January 12 – A serviceman stationed at the Russian 102nd Military Base, Valery Permyakov, kills six members of an Armenian family, including a two-year-old child, and, in addition, wounds a six-month-old child, in Gyumri, initiating a manhunt by the Armenian security services.
- January 19 – A six-month-old boy dies in hospital of his wounds, becoming the seventh member of an Armenian family dead after a killing spree by a Russian soldier.

=== April ===
- April 24 – The 100th anniversary of the Armenian genocide is commemorated.
