= 2022 in Armenia =

- Decades: 2000s; 2010s; 2020s
- See also: Other events of 2022; List of years in Armenia

Events of the year 2022 in Armenia.

== Incumbents ==
- President: Armen Sarkissian (until 1 February), Alen Simonyan (from 1 February to 13 March, acting President), Vahagn Khachaturyan (from 13 March)
- Prime Minister: Nikol Pashinyan
- Speaker: Alen Simonyan

== Events ==
=== Ongoing ===
- COVID-19 pandemic in Armenia

=== January ===
- 1 January – Armenia lifts its embargo on Turkey.
- 11 January – 2021–2022 Armenia–Azerbaijan border crisis: Three Armenian soldiers and one Azerbaijani soldier are killed in a shootout at the border town of Verin Shorzha, Gegharkunik Province.
- 14 January – The first meeting of the normalization process of Armenia–Turkey relations was held in Moscow, Russia.
- 23 January – President Armen Sarkissian resigned, replaced by Alen Simonyan as acting president.

=== February ===
- 4–20 February – 6 athletes from Armenia competed at the 2022 Winter Olympics.
- 24 February – The second meeting of the normalization process of Armenia–Turkey relations was held in Vienna, Austria.

=== March ===
- 13 March – Vahagn Khachaturyan is sworn in as President of Armenia.

=== April ===
- 25 April – Start of protests demanding the resignation of Prime Minister Nikol Pashinyan.

=== May ===
- 3 May – The third meeting of the normalization process of Armenia–Turkey relations was held in Vienna, Austria.

=== June ===
- 19 June – The protests came to an end after the opposition failed to achieve popular support.

=== July ===
- 10 July – International Biology Olympiad held in Yerevan between 10–18 July.

=== August ===
- 14 August – 2022 Yerevan explosion.

=== September ===
- 5 September – Starmus Festival held in Yerevan.
- 12–14 September – September 2022 Armenia–Azerbaijan clashes

=== October ===
- 20 October – The European Union Monitoring Capacity to Armenia begins operations.
- 21 October – The OSCE Needs Assessment Team in Armenia begins operations.

=== December ===
- 11 December – The Junior Eurovision Song Contest 2022 was held in Yerevan at the Karen Demirchyan Sports and Concerts Complex, and was won by French singer Lissandro.
- 12 December – Start of a blockade in Artsakh.
- 20 December – The EU Planning Assistance Team in Armenia becomes active.

== Deaths ==
=== January ===
- 11 January – Razmik Davoyan, Armenian poet (born 1940).
- 24 January – Vachik Mangassarian, Armenian actor (born 1943), complications from COVID-19.

=== February ===
- 4 February – Arthur Grigoryan, Armenian composer (born 1958).

== See also ==
- History of Armenia
- List of Armenia-related topics
- Outline of Armenia
