= 2016 in Armenia =

- Decades: 1990s; 2000s; 2010s; 2020s
- See also: Other events of 2016; List of years in Armenia

The following lists events in the year 2016 in Armenia.

== Incumbents ==
- President: Serzh Sargsyan
- Prime Minister: Hovik Abrahamyan (until 13 September), Karen Karapetyan (starting 13 September)
- Speaker: Galust Sahakyan

== Events ==
=== April ===
- 1–5 April – 2016 Nagorno-Karabakh conflict

=== July ===
- 17 July – At least one person is reportedly killed and others are taken hostage after an armed group seized control of a police building in Yerevan, the capital of Armenia. The gunmen demanded the release of jailed opposition figure, Jirair Sefilian, according to the National Security Service.
- 31 July – The hostage crisis comes to an end in Yerevan after the remaining gunmen laid down their arms in a police station surrender to police.

=== August ===
- 5–21 August – 33 athletes from Armenia competed at the 2016 Summer Olympics in Rio de Janeiro, Brazil.

=== September ===
- 21 September – Armenia celebrates its 25th anniversary of its independence with a military parade on the Republic Square in the center of Yerevan.
