= 2021 in Armenia =

- Decades: 2000s; 2010s; 2020s
- See also: Other events of 2021; List of years in Armenia

This is a list of individuals and events related to Armenia in 2021.

== Incumbents ==
- President: Armen Sarkissian
- Prime Minister: Nikol Pashinyan
- Speaker: Ararat Mirzoyan (until 2 August), Alen Simonyan (from 2 August)

== Events ==
=== Ongoing ===
- COVID-19 pandemic in Armenia

=== January ===
- 18 January – Russian Foreign Minister Sergey Lavrov says that Armenia has returned all Azeri prisoners who were captured during the 2020 Nagorno-Karabakh war.
- 20 January – The Ministry of Health says that Armenia plans to buy COVID-19 vaccines from AstraZeneca for 3% of the country's population.
- 22 January – The Armenian parliament installs Gagik Jahangirian and Davit Khachaturian in the Supreme Judicial Council, after being nominated to fill two vacant seats by the My Step Alliance.

=== February ===
- 25 February – Prime Minister Nikol Pashinyan warns of an attempted military coup against him after the army demands that he and his government resign.

=== March ===
- 1 March – The Armenia–EU Comprehensive and Enhanced Partnership Agreement entered into force.
- 5 March – Armenia forcedly to withdraw from the Eurovision Song Contest 2021 due to lack of attention of Athena Manoukian to participate.

=== April ===
- 24 April – US President Joe Biden officially recognized the Armenian genocide.
- 25 April – Nikol Pashinyan announced his formal resignation to allow snap elections to be held in June, although he remained as acting prime minister in the leadup to the elections.

=== May ===
- 19 May – The European Parliament unanimously adopted a resolution calling for the suspension of accession negotiations between the European Union and Turkey. The Parliament also urged Turkey to recognize the Armenian genocide as soon as possible.

=== June ===
- 20 June – 2021 Armenian parliamentary election: Acting PM Nikol Pashinyan wins the country's snap election, with his Civil Contract party gaining 54% of the vote.

=== July ===
- 23 July-8 August – 17 athletes from Armenia competed at the 2020 Summer Olympics in Tokyo, Japan

=== September ===
- 21 September – Armenia celebrated its 30th anniversary of independence from the Soviet Union.

=== November ===
- 21 November – Armenian Foreign Minister Ararat Mirzoyan announced that Armenia was ready to begin talks with Turkey on the normalization of relations without preconditions.

=== December ===
- 19 December – Maléna wins the Junior Eurovision Song Contest 2021 with the song "Qami Qami".

== Predicted and scheduled events ==
- 2022 FIFA World Cup qualification – UEFA Group J
  - 25 March – 2022 FIFA World Cup qualifiers: Liechtenstein v. Armenia
  - 28 March – 2022 FIFA World Cup qualifiers: Armenia v. Iceland
  - 31 March – 2022 FIFA World Cup qualifiers: Armenia v. Romania
  - 2 September – 2022 FIFA World Cup qualifiers: North Macedonia v. Armenia
  - 5 September – 2022 FIFA World Cup qualifiers: Germany v. Armenia
  - 8 September – 2022 FIFA World Cup qualifiers: Armenia v. Liechtenstein
  - 8 October – 2022 FIFA World Cup qualifiers: Iceland v. Armenia
  - 11 October – 2022 FIFA World Cup qualifiers: Romania v. Armenia
  - 11 November – 2022 FIFA World Cup qualifiers: Armenia v. North Macedonia
  - 14 November – 2022 FIFA World Cup qualifiers: Armenia v. Germany

== Deaths ==
- 31 March – Arkady Ter-Tadevosyan, military leader (b. 1939)
- 6 July – Djivan Gasparyan, musician and composer (b. 1928)
- 29 September – Hayko, singer and songwriter (b. 1973)

== See also ==
- Outline of Armenia
- List of Armenia-related topics
- History of Armenia
