= 2018 in Armenia =

- Decades: 1990s; 2000s; 2010s; 2020s
- See also: Other events of 2018; List of years in Armenia

The following lists events that occurred in 2018 in Armenia.

== Incumbents ==
- President: Serzh Sargsyan (until 9 April), Armen Sarkissian (from 9 April)
- Prime Minister: Karen Karapetyan (until 9 April, acting Prime Minister from 9 April to 17 April), Serzh Sargsyan (17 April to 23 April), Karen Karapetyan (acting Prime Minister from 23 April to 8 May), Nikol Pashinyan (from 8 May)
- Speaker: Ara Babloyan

== Events ==
=== February ===
- 9–25 February – 3 athletes from Armenia competed at the 2018 Winter Olympics.

=== April ===
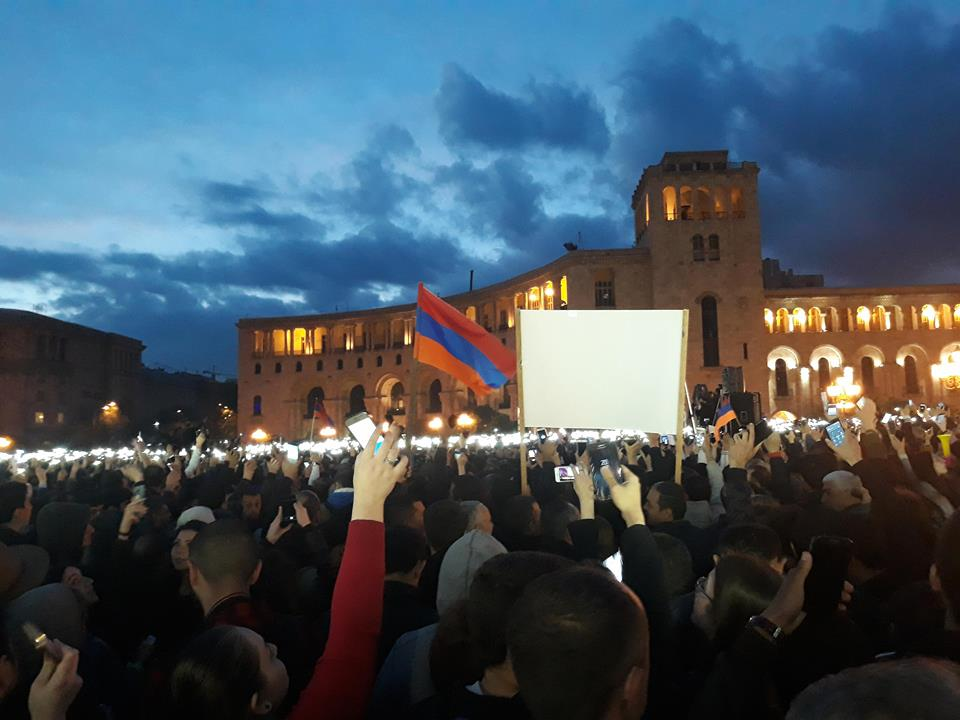
Protests against Serzh Sargsyan.

- 17 April – Protests intensify after Serzh Sargsyan former President of Armenia is appointed Prime Minister of Armenia, in what opposition figures have described as a "power grab".
- 22 April – Protest leader Nikol Pashinyan is arrested by police after a short meeting with Prime Minister Sargsyan, who left after three minutes alleging he was blackmailed to resign.
- 23 April – Serzh Sargsyan officially resigns as Prime Minister after 11 days of protests and released Pashinyan who was detained yesterday, reportedly stating "The street movement is against my tenure. I am fulfilling your demand," and "You were right; I was wrong".

=== May ===
- 8 May – Nikol Pashinyan is elected as Prime Minister of Armenia.
- 12 May – The Pashinyan government is formed.
- 28 May – Celebrations of the centennial of the founding of the First Armenian Republic.

=== June ===
- 16 June – Former Deputy Defense Minister and parliamentarian Manvel Grigoryan was arrested in Vagharshapat by the National Security Service and was charged with the possession of firearms and ammunition illegally.

=== July ===
- 26 July – The Special Investigative Service (SIS) arrests and charges former President of Armenia Robert Kocharyan with “overthrowing constitutional order of Armenia” in response to the 2008 Armenian presidential election protests in the final weeks of his tenure. That same day, Colonel General Yuri Khachaturov was indicted on the same charge of disrupting constitutional order during the protests when he was the then-Commander of the Yerevan Garrison.

=== September ===
- 23 September – Yerevan City Council elections were held.

=== October ===
- 3 October – Pashinyan fires six members of his cabinet after their respective political parties, the Armenian Revolutionary Federation and the Tsarukyan Alliance supported a parliamentary bill which would effectively limit the role of the prime minister in calling snap elections to the National Assembly.
- 16 October – Pashinyan resigns in protest of the actions taken by the two parties and promises to serve as the acting head of government until elections are held.

=== November ===
- 1 November – Pashinyan announces that his country will try to begin the process normalizing relations with Turkey without preconditions, saying that recognition of the Armenian genocide is a "security issue", rather than a matter of Armenian-Turkish relations.
- 6 November – The European Party of Armenia is founded in Yerevan by filmmaker Tigran Khzmalyan

=== December ===
- 9 December – The My Step Alliance won the parliamentary elections with an overwhelming majority of the vote, resulting in the coalition winning 88 of the 132 seats in the assembly.

== Deaths ==
- 28 February - Albert Mkrtchyan, People's Artist of Armenia (b. 1937)
- 1 October - Charles Aznavour, French-Armenian singer, lyricist, actor and diplomat (b. 1924)
