= 2013 in Armenia =

- Decades: 1990s; 2000s; 2010s; 2020s
- See also: Other events of 2013; List of years in Armenia

The following lists events that happened during 2013 in Armenia.

== Incumbents ==
- President: Serzh Sargsyan
- Prime Minister: Tigran Sargsyan
- Speaker: Hovik Abrahamyan

== Events ==
=== January ===
- January 31 - Armenian politician Paruyr Hayrikyan is shot in his right clavicle and taken to a hospital in Yerevan, during his bid for the presidency.

=== February ===
- February 18 - Voters in Armenia go to the polls for a presidential election with incumbent President Serzh Sargsyan expected to win. Independent observers including the Parliamentary Assembly of the Council of Europe have expressed concern about the conduct of the elections.
- February 19 - 2013 Armenian protests
  - Official partial returns from the Armenian presidential election indicate that incumbent President Serzh Sargsyan will be reelected in a landslide with the leading Opposition candidate Raffi Hovannisian raising concerns about irregularities.
  - A mass of his supporters gathered in Yerevan's Freedom Square, where Hovannisian urged President Sargsyan to accept "people’s victory" and concede his defeat.

=== March ===
- March 10 - Raffi Hovannisian goes on hunger strike after three weeks of mass rallies against the election results.
- March 14 - The Constitutional Court of Armenia upholds the reelection of President Serzh Sargsyan in the recent presidential election.

=== May ===
- May 5 - An election was held at the Yerevan City Council.
- May 6 - Republican Party wins absolute majority to the Yerevan city council, opposition disputes results.

=== June ===
- June 15 - Hovannisian held a small meeting with his supporters. He assured that "What we initiated 6 months ago is still in force. The main task of the Heritage is to restore the faith of people".

=== August ===
- August 23 - Hovannisian held the biggest rally in months on the 23rd anniversary of Armenia's Declaration of independence. Thousands gathered, while Hovannisian promised a series of anti-government protests in the upcoming month of September.

=== September ===
- September 3 - President Serzh Sargsyan announced in Moscow that Armenia will join the Customs Union of Belarus, Kazakhstan and Russia despite the fact that Armenia was expected to sign the European Union Association Agreement at the Eastern Partnership Summit in November. Experts describe this move as a U-turn citing apparent pressure from the Kremlin.
- September 20 - Raffi Hovannisian along with former Soviet dissident Paruyr Hayrikyan held a rally at Freedom Square. Hovannisian stated that "Independence Day is not only a national holiday, but also responsibility. Today, on the eve of the holiday, we have gathered here to say that our statehood is in danger." Hovannisian's Heritage party was one of the only parties in Armenia to openly oppose President Sargsyan's decision to join the Customs Union of Belarus, Kazakhstan and Russia.
