= 2019 in Armenia =

- Decades: 1990s; 2000s; 2010s; 2020s
- See also: Other events of 2019; List of years in Armenia

Events of the year 2019 in Armenia.

== Incumbents ==
- President: Armen Sarkissian
- Prime Minister: Nikol Pashinyan
- Speaker: Ara Babloyan (until 14 January), Ararat Mirzoyan (from 14 January)

== Events ==
=== January ===
- January 14 – The Second Pashinyan government is formed

=== July ===
- 14–27 July – The 2019 UEFA European Under-19 Championship

=== October ===
- 6–9 October – World Congress On Information Technology (WCIT) 2019
