= Health in Armenia =

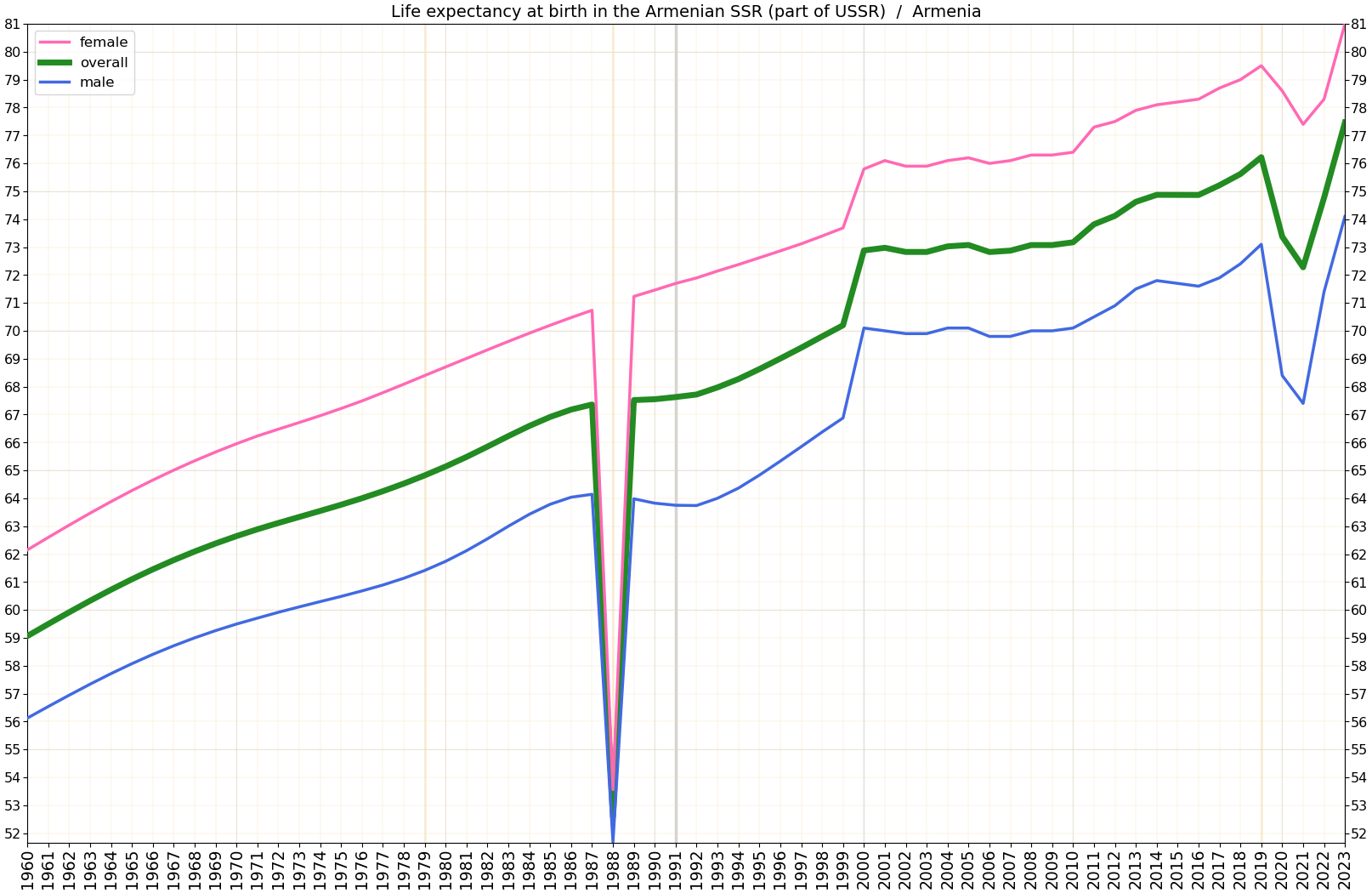
Life expectancy at birth in Armenia

After a significant decline in earlier decades, crude (Note: Crude rates are not age-adjusted.) birth rates in Armenia slightly increased from 13.0 (per 1000 people) in the year 1998 to 14.2 in 2015; this timeframe also showed a similar trajectory in the crude death rate, which grew from 8.6 to 9.3. Life expectancy at birth at 74.8 years was the 4th-highest among the Post-Soviet states in 2014.

The Human Rights Measurement Initiative finds that Armenia is fulfilling 74.6% of what it should be fulfilling for the right to health based on its level of income. When looking at the right to health with respect to children, Armenia achieves 97.5% of what is expected based on its current income. In regards to the right to health amongst the adult population, the country achieves 91.3% of what is expected based on the nation's level of income. Armenia falls into the "very bad" category when evaluating the right to reproductive health because the nation is fulfilling only 35.1% of what the nation is expected to achieve based on the resources (income) it has available.

== Healthcare system and funding ==
At the time of independence in 1991, no traces of pre-Soviet healthcare traditions were discernible. The Soviet healthcare system was highly centralized. The entire population was guaranteed free medical assistance regardless of social status, and had access to a comprehensive range of secondary and tertiary care options. After independence, Armenia was not in a position to continue to fund it. Following the reform program, all hospitals and polyclinics, rural health units (including village health centers), and health posts from the previous system continued to function. Hospitals which were formerly accountable to the local administration (and ultimately to the Ministry of Health) are now autonomous and increasingly responsible for their own budgets and management.

A Basic Benefits Package was established in 1999. This provided free specific health-care services, including medicines, to vulnerable segments of the population, including children, the elderly and disabled, impoverished people and injured military personnel. Since 2006, primary health care services have been free of charge.

In 2009, more than half of the national health budget was spent on hospitals. At the local community level, the system was weak and in rural areas often non-existent.

Vast improvements of health services in Armenia took place in the 21st century, principally easier accessibility to health-care services and an Open Enrollment program which allows Armenians to freely choose their healthcare service provider.

Health expenditures, as a percentage of government spending were 4th-lowest for the same group in 2008–14, but beat peers in the South Caucasus. Health expenditures in per capita terms (at PPP at constant 2005 USD) were nearly permanently 5th-lowest in the above group in years 1999–2014. Out-of-pocket health expenditures were 4th-highest in the same group in years 2003–06 and 2010–14. In 2014, 4.3% of health expenditures came from sources outside of Armenia.

In 2015, current health expenditures as a percentage of GDP reached 10.1%, while 81.6% of all health spendings were paid out-of-pocket, both values record high since data became available in the year 2000.

Armenian citizens entitled to the Basic Benefits Package receive full coverage with no need to pay fees or subsidized services with the state paying part of the fees but the citizen being obligated to pay for the rest. Most health services are fully private, with the citizen fully responsible for payment. In 2019, healthcare was made free for all citizens under the age of 18. The number of people receiving free or subsidized healthcare under the Basic Benefits Package was also increased, as well as the number of services offered in the program.

In 2023, the Armenian government approved a plan to gradually introduce universal health care. Under the plan, health coverage will be expanded in stages until the entire population is insured in 2027.

== Corruption in the healthcare system ==
Since independence, Armenia's national health system faced criticism because of widespread corruption among doctors and other hospital workers. Because of reduced public funding after the economic collapse of the 1990s, many employees were forced to take bribes and take advantage of their position of power within their workplace in order to make a living. This problem still persists as of today and is one of the main concerns of elected officials.

== Specific diseases ==
=== Tuberculosis ===
Tuberculosis (TB) remains a concern in Armenia, despite its TB incidence rate of 25 per 100,000, which is below the World Health Organization's (WHO) threshold for "high-priority countries." In 2023, the WHO identified Armenia, along with other countries in the Caucasus, as a high-priority region for TB, although it does not have the highest incidence rates compared to some Central Asian nations. Following a global decline in TB cases from 2010-2020, the disease has been making a slow comeback since the COVID-19 pandemic. The WHO's March 2025 report highlighted the challenges faced by countries due to reduced U.S. foreign assistance for TB control, which could hinder efforts to contain the disease and manage harder-to-treat strains.

=== HIV ===
Certified by the World Health Organization (WHO), Armenia was the first in the European region and as of October 2017 is one of 10 countries worldwide (seven of which are islands) which proved to have eliminated mother-to-child HIV transmission.

In 2010, HIV prevalence was estimated at 0.2% among adults aged 15 to 49.

=== Poliomyelitis ===
There have been no recorded cases of poliomyelitis since data became available in the year 2002.

=== Malaria ===
There were no new cases of malaria since the year 2006.

== Mortality ==
=== Infants ===
According to WHO data, the infant mortality rate nearly halved from 2002 to 2015. It dropped to 11.3 (0.1%) in 2017, the lowest rate since WHO records began in 1990.

=== Children aged 5 to 14 ===
The mortality rate for children aged 5 to 14 ranged from 0.18% to 0.21% in the years 1997-2017.

=== Adults ===
The probability of dying aged 15–60 was estimated at 11.6% in the year 2016, nearly unchanged since 2000.

== Malnutrition and obesity ==
According to a 2015-16 survey, 9% of children in Armenia are stunted and of those, 4% are severely stunted, while in 2005-10, 18-19% of children were stunted. The survey also found that 4% of Armenian children are wasted (low weight for height) and 2% severely wasted. The survey also found was that Armenian children tend to be more overweight than stunted due to improper diets. 14% of children under five years of age are overweight.

Undernourishment at 6.3% in 2014 of population remained nearly unchanged since 2007.

In 2017, the obesity rate in Armenia was 19.5%, which is lower than in all regional countries and nearly all European countries.

== Smoking ==
An anti-smoking law was passed by the Armenian parliament in February 2020. It bans smoking while driving cars or buses and imposes a ban on tobacco advertising. The ban on smoking in cafes, restaurants and other public catering facilities will enter into force in March 2022. The ban on smoking in half-closed premises of public catering facilities will come into force in May 2024. The ban on smoking in hotels came into force in May 2020.

Meanwhile, cannabis in Armenia is currently illegal for all uses.

== See also ==
- Children of Armenia Fund
- Education in Armenia
- Ministry of Health (Armenia)
- Social issues in Armenia
- World Food Programme
- World Health Organization
