= Hrayr =

Hrayr is an Armenian given name. Notable people with the name include:

- Hrayr Dzhoghk (1866–1904), Armenian military leader and strategist, fedayee, statesman, and teacher
- Hrayr Mkoyan (born 1986), Armenian footballer
- Hrayr Tovmasyan (born 1970), president of Constitutional Court of Armenia

Breakdown : First part of the name (HR) is an abbreviated word Hour (pronounced Who-rr) meaning fire in Armenian and Ayr means Man.
