= 2014 in Armenia =

- Decades: 1990s; 2000s; 2010s; 2020s
- See also: Other events of 2014; List of years in Armenia

The following lists events that happened during 2014 in Armenia.

== Incumbents ==
- President: Serzh Sargsyan
- Prime Minister: Tigran Sargsyan (until 13 April), Hovik Abrahamyan (starting 13 April)

== Events ==
=== February ===
- 7-23 February - 4 athletes from Armenia competed at the 2014 Winter Olympics in Sochi, Russia.

=== April ===
- 10 April - On the eve of the 99th anniversary of the Armenian genocide, the United States Senate Committee on Foreign Relations reported to a resolution (S. Res. 410) United States Senate which condemns and commemorates the Armenian genocide, describing it as an act of "elimination of the over 2,500-year presence of Armenians in their historic homeland". It drafted by committee chairman Robert Menendez (D-NJ), it was approved by a vote of 12–5. In his statement, co-author of the resolution, Mark Kirk (R-IL) made a reference to the 100th anniversary of the genocide and the importance of its recognition.

=== May ===
- 17 May - A landslide in the Dariali Gorge in northeastern Georgia kills at least three people, blocks the Terek River, and disrupts gas supply to Armenia.

=== June ===
- 4 June - When viewing on the recognition of the Armenian genocide, the Foreign Minister of Australia Julie Bishop publicly declared that, while respecting the rights of individuals and groups to have strong views on the matter, Australia does not view the tragic events during the end of the Ottoman Empire as a genocide.
- 20 June - The Presbyterian Church (USA) adopted a resolution recognizing the Armenian genocide and adopting the 2015 church calendar designating 26 April as the day for its observance. It also directed the church's Mission Agency to prepare educational and liturgical resources for member churches in preparation for this event. This resolution was the first of its kind for a major American church body.
- 23 June - The parliament of Spain's autonomous community of Navarre adopted a measure recognizing the Armenian genocide. The measure came after a series of visits by members of the Navarre parliament to Armenia and Artsakh..

=== August ===
- 1 August - At least eight Azeri soldiers are killed following clashes with Armenian troops on the border and near the disputed Nagorno-Karabakh region. Azerbaijan said Armenia had also suffered losses, although it did not provide any details.
- 2 August - Five more Azeri troops are killed in overnight fighting with ethnic Armenians in Nagorno-Karabakh. The casualties bring the death toll to at least 13 in a flare-up of violence over the last few days around Nagorno-Karabakh. Russia has said that any further escalation is unacceptable.
- 3 August - Four Azerbaijani soldiers are killed in fresh clashes with Armenian groups near the border of the breakaway Nagorno-Karabakh Republic.
- 6 August - 2014 Armenian–Azerbaijani clashes
  - The death toll reached 18 people.
  - Serzh Sargsyan, the Armenian President, and Ilham Aliyev, the Azerbaijani President, were to meet to discuss the clashes at neutral ground in Sochi.
- 9 August - Azerbaijan's President Ilham Aliyev declares a ‘state of war’ with Armenia on Twitter saying “We are not living in peace, we are living in a state of war".
- 19 August - President Serzh Sargsyan adds his voice to concerns about Iraq’s Yazidi community targeted by Islamist militants and told the Armenian government to provide them with more humanitarian aid than was initially planned.

=== November ===
- 7 November - The 8-chapter section work disappearance, denying the Armenian genocide, causes concerns in Turkey.
- 11 November - Turkey's Green Party officially recognizes the Armenian genocide.
- 12 November - Azerbaijan shoots down an Armenian Mil Mi-24 military helicopter.
- 15 November - Italian MP, Romina Mura, complains on the Turkish embassy for their views on the Armenian genocide.

== Deaths ==
=== February ===
- 22 February - Grigor Gurzadyan, astrophysicist, 91
