= Tobacco policy in Armenia =

Tobacco policy in Armenia is the attempt by the Armenian authorities to regulate smoking in Armenia. Tobacco laws and regulations are controlled by the Ministry of Health of Armenia. Armenian men tend to be the most common tobacco users, as 42.5% of men over the age of 15 smoke.

A pictogram is often used to denote a smoking ban in Armenia.

== Emergence of the Tobacco Control Law ==
According to the World Health Organization (WHO) the three leading health risk factors in Armenia are: “alcohol use, road traffic injuries, and tobacco use.” Armenia ranks first in Europe and sixth in the world with more than 70% of the population being cigarette smokers. In 2004, Armenia joined the WHO's Framework Convention on Tobacco Control (FCTC) and the National Tobacco Program was approved by Armenia's Parliament. A bill was proposed to abolish the promotion and sale of tobacco products to minors, ban smoking in public places (such as universities and hospitals), enforce stricter regulations on tobacco companies and raise prices on all tobacco products to promote healthy lifestyles among all individuals in the country.

The first “National Tobacco Control Law on Tobacco Realization, Consumption, Production and Usage Limitations” was signed into law in 2005 by President Robert Kocharyan. Although the law is in place to prohibit smoking in public places, regulate distribution of cigarettes by manufacturers, and improve public health and awareness of the health hazards of smoking, a lack of enforcement has rendered this law unsuccessful.

== Smoking among men, women, and adolescents ==
Tobacco use in Armenia is most commonly seen in men. However, over the years, women have started to smoke cigarettes as well, allowing for the emergence of a new market directed towards female smokers. According to the most recent WHO reports, an estimated 52.5% of men and 1.5% of women over the age of 15 are smokers. With smoking gaining popularity among women, tobacco companies are given an opportunity for a new market targeting female smokers. Large tobacco companies produce thin, colored, menthol flavored cigarettes especially designed for female smokers. Although there is a ban on the sale and advertisement of tobacco products to those who are underage (under the age of 18) adolescents have also begun smoking at higher rates, starting as young as thirteen years of age due to a lack of enforcement of this ban. This increasing trend in cigarette smoking has led to major health risks such as various lung diseases, risk of heart attacks, an increased risk of malignant tumors and allergies.

== Regulations on marketing of tobacco products and resolving uninformed consumer issues ==
Per the FCTC's requirements, the 2005 law that was signed by President Kocharyan also imposed regulations on public advertisement of tobacco products and proposed a complete ban of advertisements by 2010. According to the FCTC's requirements the law also mandated proper labeling of cigarette packs to inform the public about the health risks associated with smoking. The warning label on cigarette packs reads “Smoking is Hazardous Health” and serves as a warning label for smokers.

== The Ministry of Health and the future of Armenia's tobacco control policy ==
The Ministry of Health of Armenia is in control of laws and regulations associated with tobacco use. As of 2016, the current Minister of the department is Levon Altunyan. The Ministry plans to have stricter regulations on the production, sale and consumption of all tobacco products as recently reported by Altunyan.

An anti-smoking law was passed by the Armenian parliament in February 2020. It bans smoking while driving cars or buses and imposes a ban on tobacco advertising. The ban on smoking in cafes, restaurants and other public catering facilities will enter into force in March 2022. The ban on smoking in half-closed premises of public catering facilities will come into force in May 2024. Meanwhile, the ban on smoking in hotels came into force in May 2020.

== See also ==
- Cannabis in Armenia
- List of countries by cigarette consumption per capita
- List of smoking bans
- Prevalence of tobacco use
