= Solidarity Party (Armenia) =

Solidarity Party Համերաշխություն կուսակցություն
- Leader: Sargis Avetisyan
- Founded: 2003
- Headquarters: Yerevan, Armenia
- Ideology: Conservatism
- Political position: Centre
- National Assembly: 0 / 107

Website
- www.solidarity.am/

The Solidarity Party (Armenian: Համերաշխություն կուսակցություն, romanized: Hamerashkhut’yun kusakts’ut’yun) is an Armenian political party.

== History ==
The party is led by Sargis Avetisyan and does not maintain any representation within the National Assembly. Currently, the party acts as an extra-parliamentary force.

Prior to the 2012 Armenian parliamentary election, the party endorsed the Prosperous Armenia party.

Prior to the 2017 Armenian parliamentary elections, the party stated that the Republican Party of Armenia must step aside and admit political defeat, while also stating they would not work with the Way Out Alliance. Sargis Avetisyan participated as a candidate part of the Tsarukyan Alliance, but failed to win a seat in the National Assembly.

The party has been critical of Nikol Pashinyan's leadership as Prime Minister, accusing the Prime Minister of being a globalist. The party openly supports former Prime Minister Robert Kocharyan and called for his release from prison.

The party endorsed the Armenia Alliance in the 2021 Armenian parliamentary election.

== Ideology ==
The party opposes extreme manifestations of liberalism and socialism, supports a strong and united state, and supports the activities of the Armenian Apostolic Church.

== Activities ==
On 24 February 2020, the party proclaimed that they would boycott the 2021 Armenian constitutional referendum.

On 9 November 2020, the party signed a joint declaration with the other member parties of the Homeland Salvation Movement calling on Prime Minister Nikol Pashinyan to resign during the 2020–2021 Armenian protests.

== See also ==
- Programs of political parties in Armenia
