= Cannabis in Armenia =

- Location of Armenia (dark green)
- Medicinal: Illegal
- Recreational: Illegal
- Hemp: Illegal

Cannabis in Armenia is illegal for all uses.

== Background ==
Armenia cultivates some small amounts of cannabis, mostly for local consumption. Some indigenous strains of cannabis grow in the wild in Armenia, but a large degree of those blooms have been subject to state sponsored eradication. Armenia also serves as a transit route for hashish coming from Central Asia, headed for Europe and the United States.

Cannabis and hashish comprises the majority of recreational illicit drug usage in Armenia. Nevertheless, lifetime drug use among teenagers is among the lowest in all of Europe (4-7%). Consumption is more prevalent among men in Armenia. While prior cannabis use has been decriminalized as of 2009, those caught possessing are subject to heavy fines and an average jail sentence of two months.

== Developments ==
In 2019, there were rumors that cannabis would become decriminalized in Armenia, however the Ministry of Health of Armenia confirmed that there were no such plans for the time being.

In February 2021, the Government of Armenia announced plans to allow cultivation of industrial hemp as a part of an economic programme to boost the economy. The Minister of the Economy, Vahan Kerobyan, noted that the authorities, including law enforcement, would maintain control and oversight of the process of hemp production, to ensure that Armenian drug legislation is not breached.

At present, there is also another cannabis-related draft law in Armenia's parliament which has been under discussion since December 2019. The law would allow the use of psychotropic drugs.

== See also ==
- Annual cannabis use by country
- Legality of cannabis
- Tobacco Policy in Armenia
