= Babken Ararktsyan =

Armenian politician (1944–2023)

- Բաբկեն Արարքցյան
- Ararktsyan in 2014

President of the National Assembly
- In office 27 July 1995 – 3 February 1998
- Preceded by: position established
- Succeeded by: Khosrov Harutyunyan

Chairman of the Supreme Council of Armenia
- In office 21 September 1991 – 27 July 1995
- Preceded by: Levon Ter-Petrosyan
- Succeeded by: position abolished

Personal details
- Born: 16 September 1944 Yerevan, Armenian SSR, USSR
- Died: 13 December 2023 (aged 79)
- Party: Pan-Armenian National Movement
- Occupation: Mathematician

Babken Gurgeni Ararktsyan (Armenian: Բաբկեն Գուրգենի Արարքցյան, 16 September 1944 – 13 December 2023) was an Armenian politician. He was Chairman of the Supreme Council from 1991 to 1995 and Speaker of the National Assembly from 1995 to 1998.

Political offices
Preceded by Levon Ter-Petrosyan	Chairman of the Supreme Council of Armenia; 1991–1995	Succeeded by Position abolished
Preceded by Position established	President of the National Assembly of Armenia; 1995–1998	Succeeded by Khosrov Harutyunyan
