= Gurgen Egiazaryan =

Armenian politician (1948–2020)

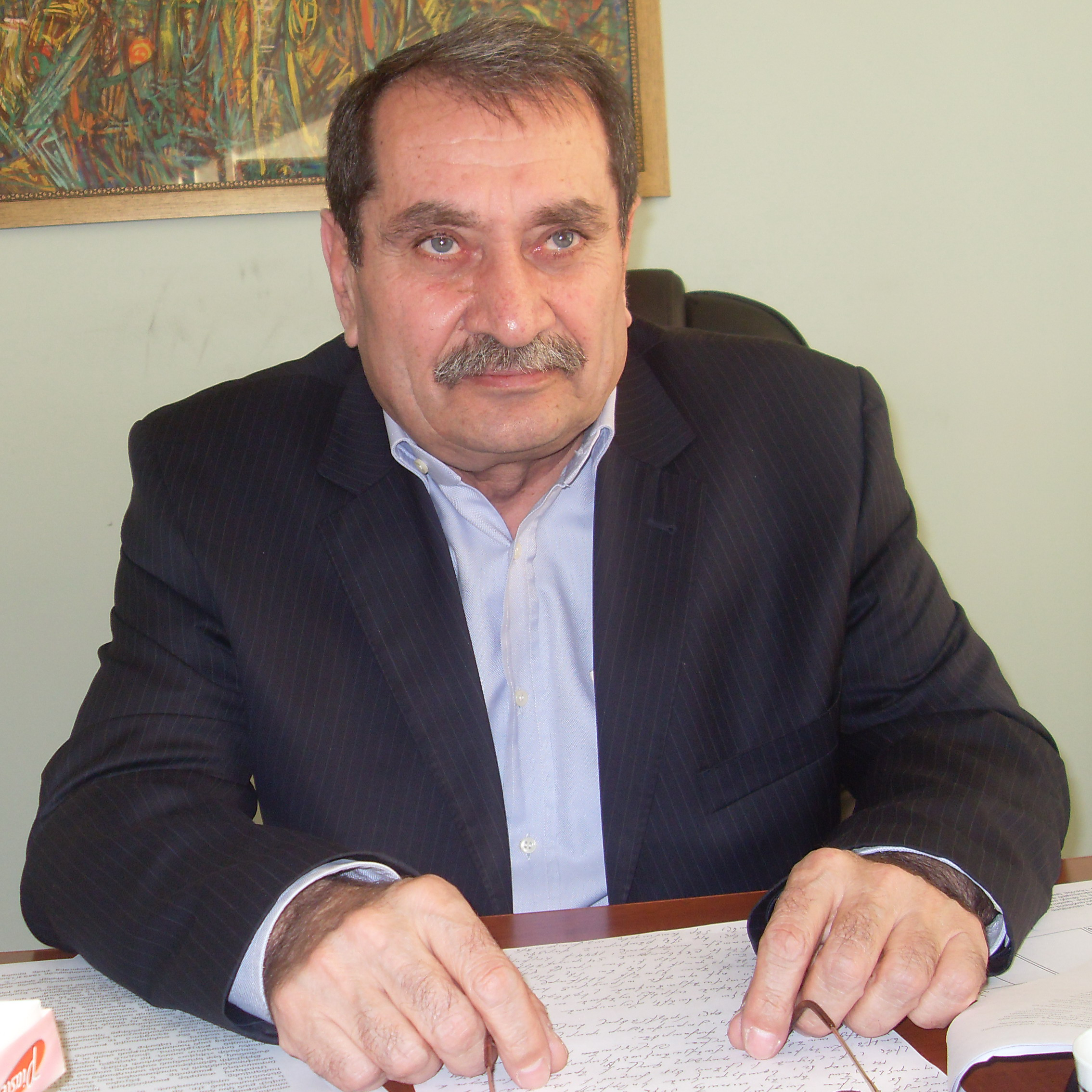
Egiazaryan in 2011

Gurgen Ambartsumovich Egiazaryan (Armenian: Գուրգեն Համբարձումի Եղիազարյան; 29 September 1948 — 28 October 2020) was an Armenian politician and civil servant.

== Biography ==
Egiazaryan was born in Yerevan. He studied Economics at the Yerevan State University from 1967 to 1973, graduating in 1973, and Law at the USSR Ministry of Internal Affairs Academy from 1987 to 1990.

Starting from 1976, he held various offices within the Ministry of Internal Affairs of the Armenian SSR and later of the Republic of Armenia, including head of the search department, head of the 7th department of the Ministry of Internal Affairs, and Deputy Minister of National Security. From 1999 to 2003 he was a member of the Armenian Parliament, and member of the Standing Commission on Defense, National Security and Internal Affairs.

In 2003 he became a member of the "New Times" Party, part of the opposition.

On 18 December 2006 he was invited to the Prosecutor General's Office to give explanations about an interview, in which he claimed that there had been a video recording showing the use of psychotropic substances and physical violence to obtain the evidence necessary for the investigation of the 1999 Armenian parliament shooting.

In his later years he wrote three books, The Children of the Sun (Armenian: Արեգակի զավակը, 2011), The Thief (Armenian: Գողը, 2016) and The Wolf Knot Operation (Armenian: Գայլի հանգույց գործողությունը, 2016).

Ten days after being admitted to Surb Astvatsamayr Medical Center in Yerevan, Egiazaryan died on 28 October 2020, aged 72, twenty nine days after his birthday, from COVID-19, during the COVID-19 pandemic in Armenia.
