= Anahit Avanesian =

Armenian jurist and politician (born 1981)

- Անահիտ Ավանեսյան
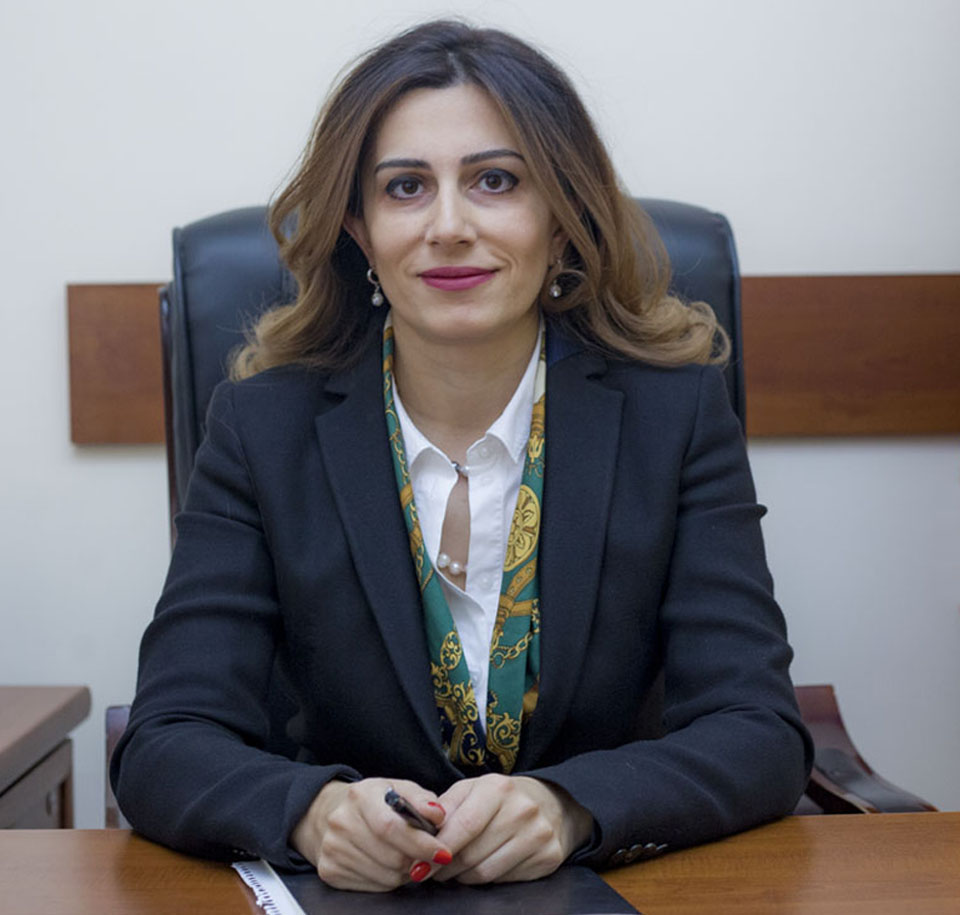

Minister of Health
- Incumbent
- Assumed office 7 June 2021
- Preceded by: Arsen Torosyan

Personal details
- Born: Anahit Avanesian; 21 March 1981 (age 45) Yerevan, Armenian SSR, Soviet Union
- Citizenship: Armenian
- Education: Yerevan State University

Anahit Avanesian (Armenian: Անահիտ Ավանեսյան; born 21 March 1981) is an Armenian jurist and the current minister of health of Armenia. Before, she has been a jurist in the Armenian Ministry of Foreign Affairs and the pharmaceutical industry.

== Education ==
She enrolled in the Faculty of Law of the Yerevan State University in 1997 from where she earned a M.Sc. in Civil Law in 2003. She followed up on her studies at the American University of Armenia, graduating from the Master Programme in Law. Between 2002 and 2004, she took part in Leadership Programs of the Leadership Development Center and the South Caucasus Young Women Leadership program.

== Professional career ==
Her professional career began in 2000 as a jurist for the ministry of foreign affairs and the State Reserve Agency in the Ministry of Emergency situations. From 2005 until 2015 she was a jurist for the NGO Democracy Today. By 2014 she transferred into the pharmaceutical industry to Arpharmacia where she acted as member of the board from 2017 and 2018.

== Political career ==
She entered the public administration in May 2018 as a deputy health minister, becoming in May 2020 the first deputy health minister. In January 2021, she became the successor of Health Minister Arsen Torosyan (hy) from the Civil Contract and the first woman in the cabinet of Prime Minister Nikol Pashynian. As health minister, she was a central figure responsible for dealing with affronting the COVID-19 pandemic.

== Personal life ==
She is married and has three children.
