= Vice President of Armenia =

Government position in Armenia

- Հայաստանի Հանրապետության փոխնախագահ
- Coat of arms

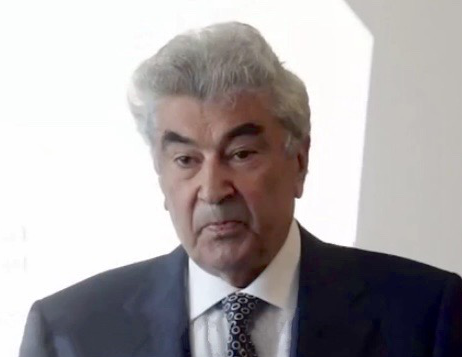
- Gagik Harutyunyan
- Appointer: President of Armenia
- Precursor: None
- Formation: 16 October 1991
- First holder: Gagik Harutyunyan
- Final holder: Gagik Harutyunyan
- Abolished: 6 February 1996

The vice president of Armenia (Armenian: Հայաստանի Հանրապետության փոխնախագահ, romanized: Hayastani Hanrapetut’yan p’vokhnakhagah) was a political position in the government of Armenia created in 1991. The position was abolished by the constitution of 1995 which took effect in February 1996.

== Officeholders ==
| No. | Image | Name | Inaugurated | Left office |
|---|---|---|---|---|
| 1 | | Gagik Harutyunyan | 16 October 1991 | 6 February 1996 |
