= Ara Babloyan =

Armenian politician

- Արա Բաբլոյան
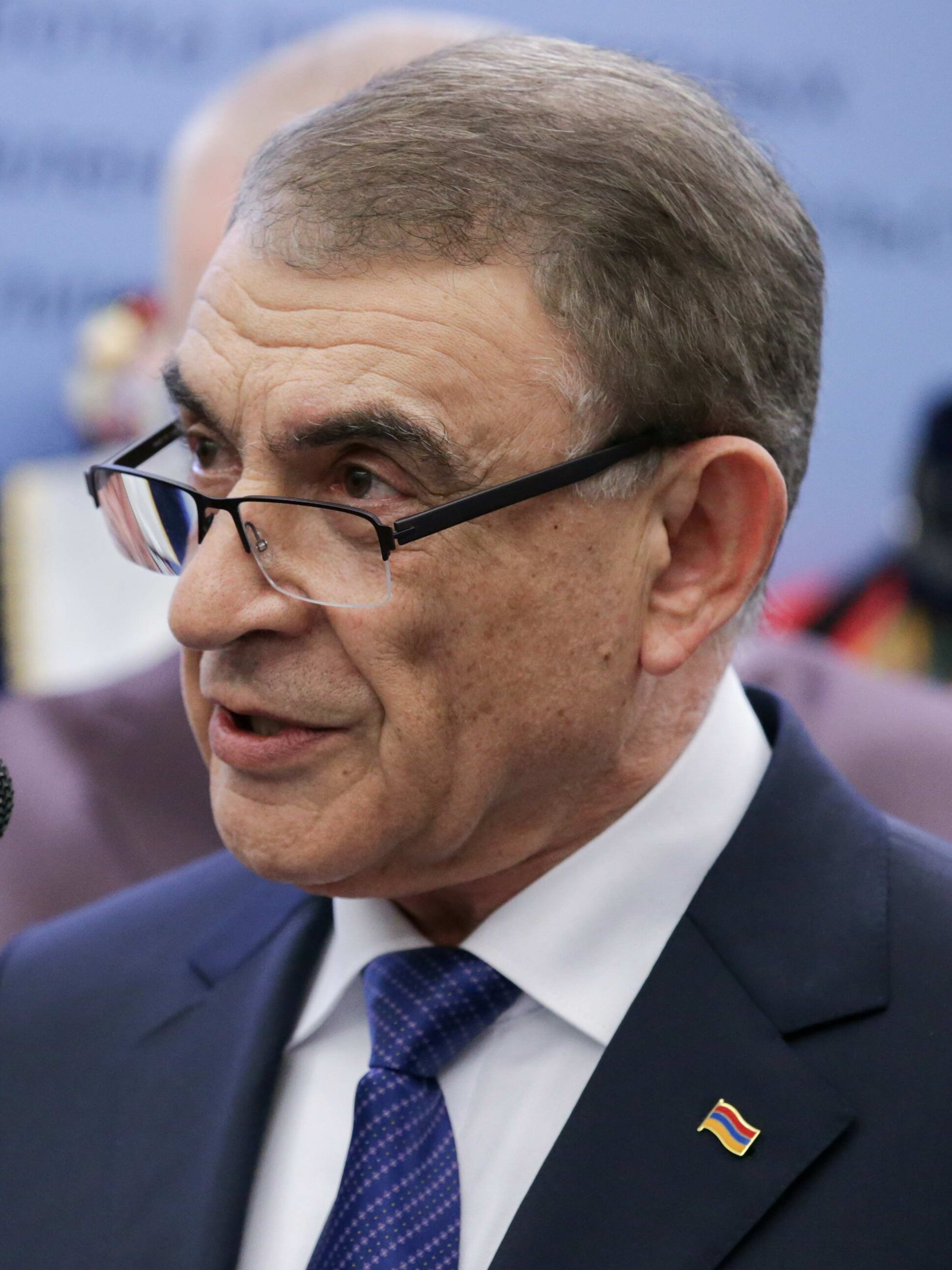

President of the National Assembly
- In office 18 May 2017 – 14 January 2019
- President: Serzh Sargsyan; Armen Sarkissian
- Preceded by: Galust Sahakyan
- Succeeded by: Ararat Mirzoyan

Member of the National Assembly
- In office 12 May 2007 – 14 January 2019

Minister of Healthcare
- In office 1991–1997
- Prime Minister: Vazgen Manukyan; Gagik Harutyunyan; Khosrov Harutyunyan; Hrant Bagratyan; Armen Sargsyan
- Preceded by: Mihran Nazaretyan
- Succeeded by: Gagik Stamboltsyan

Personal details
- Born: 5 May 1947 (age 79) Yerevan, Armenian SSR, Soviet Union
- Party: Republican Party of Armenia
- Education: Yerevan State Medical University
- Occupation: Pediatrician; Politician

Ara Babloyan (Armenian:Արա Բաբլոյան; born 5 May 1947) is an Armenian pediatric surgeon and politician, and the former President of the National Assembly of Armenia.

== Career ==
Babloyan earned his M.D. from M. Heratsi Yerevan State Medical University in 1971. He specialized in pediatric surgery, as well as kidney and liver transplantation, through training in Russia, Belgium, Switzerland, and France, achieving a postdoctoral degree and a professorship.

His medical career included roles at various hospitals, culminating in his leadership as Head of the Urology Department at Yerevan Children's Clinical Hospital No. 3 (1982–1990) and the founding of the "Specialized Center of Urology, Nephrology, and Pediatric Surgery" in 1990. He also served as Chair of Pediatric Surgery at Yerevan State Medical University and was Armenia’s Chief Pediatric Surgeon.

Babloyan was Minister of Health from 1991 to 1997 and later held executive positions at "Arabkir" Children's Clinical Centre and the United Children Charitable Fund. Internationally, he was a member of the WHO Executive Committee and contributed to various pediatric and nephrology organizations.

Transitioning into politics, he served in Armenia’s National Assembly from 2007 to 2017, chairing the Standing Committee on Health Care. In 2017, he was elected President of the National Assembly, capping a career dedicated to medicine and public service.

== Criminal prosecution and innocence ==
In October 2019, Ara Babloyan was under criminal prosecution as a suspect of assisting the seizure of the powers of the Constitutional Court of Armenia and committing official forgery. Later, Babloyan has been charged with assisting the seizure of the powers of the Constitutional Court of Armenia and committing official forgery and the criminal case with the indictment has been sent to the prosecutor supervising the case for the approval of the indictment. The prosecutor did not approve the indictment of the case and has sent it back to the investigative authorities (the Special Investigation Service) for further and additional investigation. Then, on March 5, 2020, the indictment against Ara Babloyan was confirmed by the Prosecutor's Office of the Republic of Armenia and passed to the Court of General Jurisdiction of Yerevan. On January 15, 2024, the Court of General Jurisdiction of Yerevan ruled to declare Ara Babloyan's innocence of all the charges and to acquit him. On October 31, 2024, the Anti-Corruption Court of Appeal rejected the Prosecutor's Office's appeal and left the verdict acquitting Ara Babloyan unchanged and in force. By its decision of February 17, 2025, the Court of Cassation of the Republic of Armenia rejected the appeal of the Prosecutor General of the Republic of Armenia, and the verdict of the Court dated January 15, 2024 confirming the innocence and acquitting Ara Babloyan of the acts charged entered into legal force.

As a result of the initiated criminal prosecution the declaration of innocence of Ara Babloyan was completely confirmed.

== Honours ==
Ara Babloyan was honored with several awards.

2005 – Gold Medal by the Ministry of Education and Science of Armenia on the occasion of the 75th anniversary of Yerevan State Medical University.

2005 – "Officier de l'Ordre National Du Merite" Medal for the development of professional cooperation and Armenian – French relations by Jacques Chirac, the President of French Republic.

2007 – "Mkhitar Heratsi" Medal.

2012 – the Jubilee Medal of the "Armed Forces of Armenia: 20 Years" by the decree of the Defense Minister of Armenia.

2013 – the Nagorno-Karabakh Republic’s "Gratitude" Medal.

2014 – the Medals of Honor, "Saint Sahak – Saint Mesrop" by Catholicos Karekin II, the Supreme Patriarch of all Armenians.

2015 – the President of Armenia Award for scientific achievements in the field of medicine.

2016 – Second rank Order of Services to Motherland.

Political offices
Preceded by Galust Sahakyan	President of the National Assembly of Armenia; 2017–2019	Succeeded by Ararat Mirzoyan
