= Serop Zakaryan =

Armenian politician

Serop Zakarian
- Սերոբ Զաքարեան

Chairman of the Parliament of Armenia
- In office 30 June 1918 – 1 August 1918
- Succeeded by: Avetik Sahakyan

Personal details
- Party: Armenian Revolutionary Federation

Serop Zakarian (Armenian: Սերոբ Զաքարեան) was an Armenian politician and the first parliamentary speaker of the First Republic of Armenia. He was speaker from 30 June 1918 until 1 August 1919. During this period, the Prime Minister was Hovhannes Kajaznuni. He was succeeded by Avetik Sahakyan.
