= Bagrat Asatryan =

Armenian banker and economist

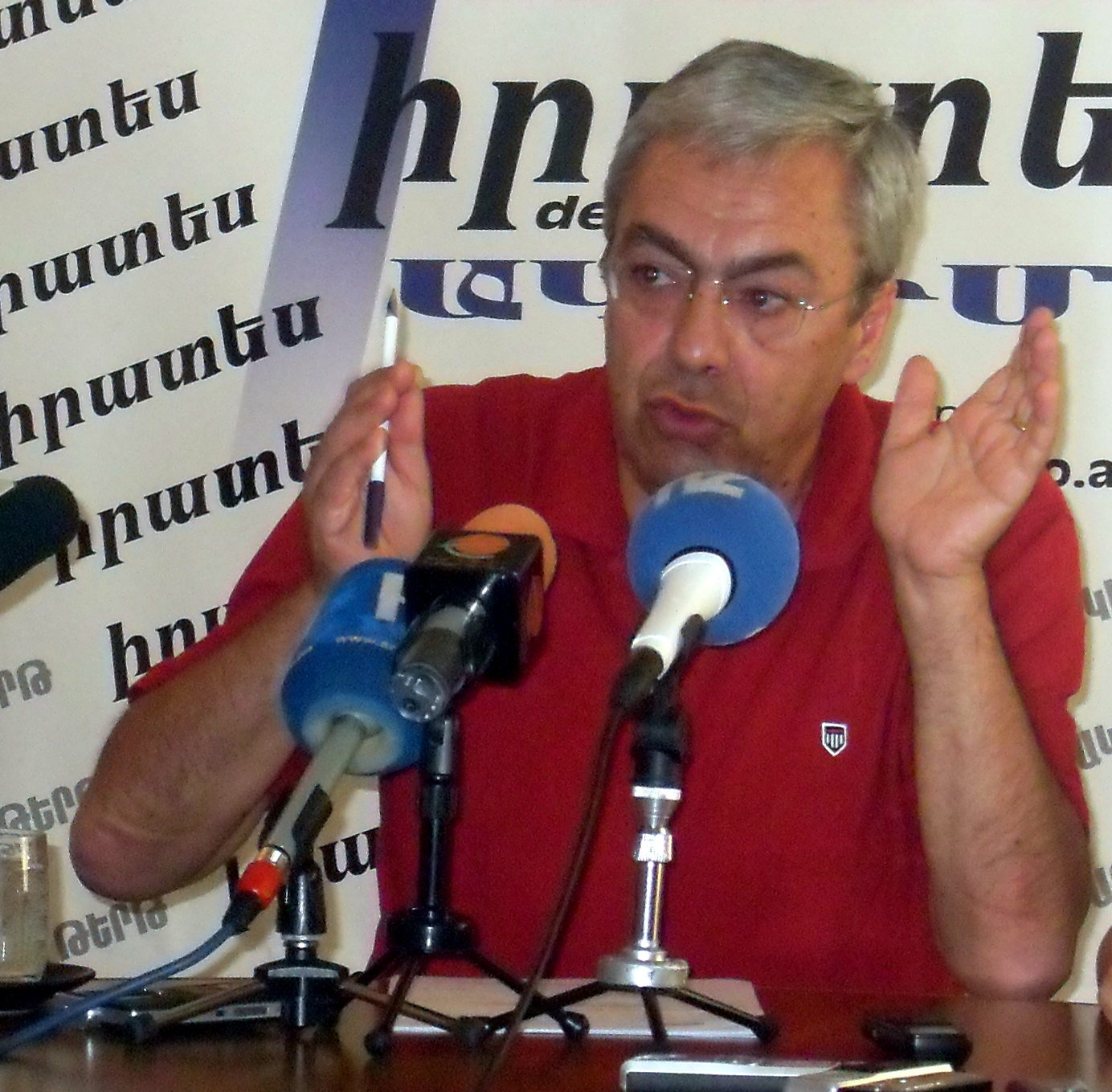

2nd chairman of the Central Bank of Armenia
- In office 1994–1998
- Preceded by: Isahak Isahakyan
- Succeeded by: Tigran Sargsyan

Personal details
- Born: February 2, 1956 (age 70) Armenian SSR
- Education: Yerevan State University
- Profession: economist

Bagrat A. Asatryan (Armenian: Բագրատ Արտաշեսի Ասատրյան, born February 2, 1956), also transliterated Bagrat Asatrian or Assatrian, is an Armenian economist and the former chairman of the Central Bank of Armenia from 1994 to 1998. He is one of the architects of the modern-day Armenia. On February 3, 1998 because of a political crisis in the country, Bagrat Asatryan resigned from his post with several of his key allies including the President Levon Ter-Petrossian, Vano Siradeghyan, Head of the National Assembly Babken Ararktsyan and Minister of Foreign Affairs Alexander Arzumanyan.

== Early life ==
Bagrat Asatryan was born in the Armenian SSR. In 1977 he graduated from Yerevan State University as an Economist. B. Asatryan worked as a scientific-research assistant and in 1985 received his Ph.D. in economics from the Institute of Economics at the Academy of Sciences of Armenia.

== Life after independence ==
Asatryan was an activist of the revolutionary movement in Armenia in the late 1980s. In August 1990 Asatryan, already a member of the Armenian National Movement (ÐÐÞ), became a deputy to the Supreme Council of the First Convocation of Armenia, where he was the chair of the Standing Committee on Health and Social Affairs. In 1995 he was elected as a member of the National Assembly of Armenia. In 1994 Asatryan was elected the chairman of the Central Bank of Armenia by the National Assembly. Some of CB’s main operations of this period were putting into circulation and stabilizing the newly implemented Armenian monetary value Dram (AMD), constructing an entirely new banking system in the new market economy. Before him a parliamentary commission introduced the Armenian dram. Bagrat Asatryan is the author of the first Monetary Policy implemented by the CBA in 1995, he is also the initiator of several significant legislative pieces about the banking system in Armenia, including laws on "The Central Bank", "Banks and Banking", "Bank Bankruptcy", "Bank Secrecy", which were designed to regulate the relationships in the banking system and were adopted by the National Assembly in June 1996. In 1998 Dr. Asatryan and several of his key allies resigned after a political crisis, which was a result of the Nagorno-Karabakh conflict and disagreement over its solution among high government officials.

After leaving the government Asatryan took several professional posts: serving as the President of the [Association of Banks of Armenia] (1998–1999) and the Executive Director of [ArmimpexBank] (1999–2003). Since 1999 Dr. Asatryan is a full professor at Yerevan State University, faculty of Economics, department of Finance and Accounting.

He is the author of more than 20 scholarly publications in Armenian, Russian and English. In 2005 as a head of a team of young professionals he published his more than 700 pages long book “Banking”, which serves as a textbook in YSU and is the only publication about Armenia’s banking system, its principles, history, evolution, transition to market economy etc. Bagrat Asatryan is married and has two sons.
