= 2012 in Armenia =

- Decades: 1990s; 2000s; 2010s; 2020s
- See also: Other events of 2012; List of years in Armenia

The following lists events that happened during 2012 in Armenia.

== Incumbents ==
- President: Serzh Sargsyan
- Prime Minister: Tigran Sargsyan

== Events ==
=== January ===
- January 23 - The French Senate passes a bill that makes it illegal for citizens to deny the Armenian genocide by the Ottoman Empire.

=== May ===
- May 4 - Official figures indicate that at least 144 people were injured at an Armenian government campaign event in Yerevan's central square after an explosion during a political rally.
- May 6 - Voters in Armenia go to the polls for a parliamentary election with exit polls showing the ruling Republican Party doing well.

=== June ===
- June 5 - Azerbaijan accuses Armenia of shooting dead five of its soldiers on the border of those two countries, a day after three Armenians were killed.
- June 6 - A new clash kills an Armenian soldier in the Nagorno-Karabakh conflict.

=== July ===
- July 27-August 12 - 25 athletes from Armenia competed at the 2012 Summer Olympics in London, England, United Kingdom.

=== August ===
- August 31 - Armenia suspends diplomatic relations with Hungary after Ramil Safarov's extradition to Azerbaijan.
