= Mihran Nazaryan =

Armenian politician (born 1944)

Mihran Konstantinovich Nazaryan (Armenian:Միհրան Կոստանդինի Նազարեթյան; born 1 May 1944) was an Armenian politician.

== Life and career ==
Nazaryan was born 1 May 1944 in Yerevan.

He served as the minister of health from 1990 to 1991.
