= 2020 Armenian constitutional amendment =

A constitutional amendment took place on 22 June 2020 in Armenia. A referendum was initially scheduled for 5 April 2020, but on 16 March 2020 was indefinitely postponed as a result of the COVID-19 pandemic. In the absence of a referendum, the parliament instead voted for the constitutional amendment directly.

== Proposed amendments ==
The proposed amendments to article 213 of the constitution of Armenia would result in the dismissal of the seven judges of the nine-member Constitutional Court who were appointed before the 2018 revolution. Article 213 is a transitional amendment in the form of a grandfather clause, allowing the judges chosen before the promulgation of the 2015 constitution to remain in the Court in accordance with the rules in place when they were chosen. New judges (post-2015) are chosen for a twelve-year term, while the previous judges either remained in office until reaching 65 years-old (according to the 1995 constitution) or 70 years old (according to the 2005 constitution). The seven judges appointed before the 2015 constitution have all served for more than twelve years, with some only scheduled to retire in 2035.

The proposed amendments followed a ruling by the Constitutional Court in September 2019 that charges against former President Robert Kocharyan were partly unconstitutional. Prime Minister Nikol Pashinyan claimed that "the only hope of the former corrupt regime is pinned on the Constitutional Court and its president Hrayr Tovmasyan."

Although members of the National Assembly had the powers to pass the amendment removing the judges without calling a referendum by voting by a two-thirds majority to do so, the legislation was approved on 6 February by 88 votes to 15, followed by the abstention of these 88 MPs from the vote on avoiding a referendum, deliberately triggering one. The legislation was signed by President Armen Sarkissian on 9 February.

The referendum was opposed by the Bright Armenia party, which claimed proper procedures had not been followed as a review of the proposals had not been completed by the State-Legal Standing Committee.

In accordance with article 207 of the 2015 constitution, in order to be passed, the proposals need to be approved by a majority of all votes cast in a referendum (including invalid and blank) with at least 25% of all registered voters voting in favour.

== Positions ==
Position	Parties
Yes	My Step Alliance/Civil Contract
Yes	Citizen's Decision
Yes	Hanrapetutyun Party
Yes	Armenian National Congress
Yes	People's Party of Armenia
Yes	Armenian Democratic Liberal Party
Boycott	Prosperous Armenia
Boycott	Bright Armenia
Boycott	Armenian Revolutionary Federation
Boycott	Republican Party of Armenia
Boycott	Solidarity Party
