= Samvel Nikoyan =

Armenian politician

- Սամվել Նիկոյան

President of the National Assembly
- In office December 6, 2011 – May 31, 2012
- Preceded by: Hovik Abrahamyan
- Succeeded by: Hovik Abrahamyan

Vice-President National Assembly
- In office 2009–2011
- Preceded by: Hrayr Karapetyan
- Succeeded by: Samvel Balasanyan

Personal details
- Born: February 13, 1957 (age 69) Sarnaghbyur, Shirak Province
- Spouse: Married
- Children: Three children
- Awards: "Andranik Ozanyan" medal of the Armed Forces of Armenia RA Prime Minister Commemorative Medal

Samvel Nikoyan (Armenian: Սամվել Պարգևի Նիկոյան, born February 13, 1957) is an Armenian politician and Former President of the National Assembly from 2011 to 2012. In 2013 he served as Deputy Chair of the National Assembly.

In 2005 he was awarded the "Andranik Ozanyan" medal of the Armed Forces of Armenia, and was also rewarded the RA Prime Minister Commemorative Medal.

Nikoyan is married with three children.

Political offices
Preceded by Hovik Abrahamyan	President of the National Assembly of Armenia; 2011–2012	Succeeded by Hovik Abrahamyan
