= Perch Zeytuntsyan =

Armenian playwright and screenwriter

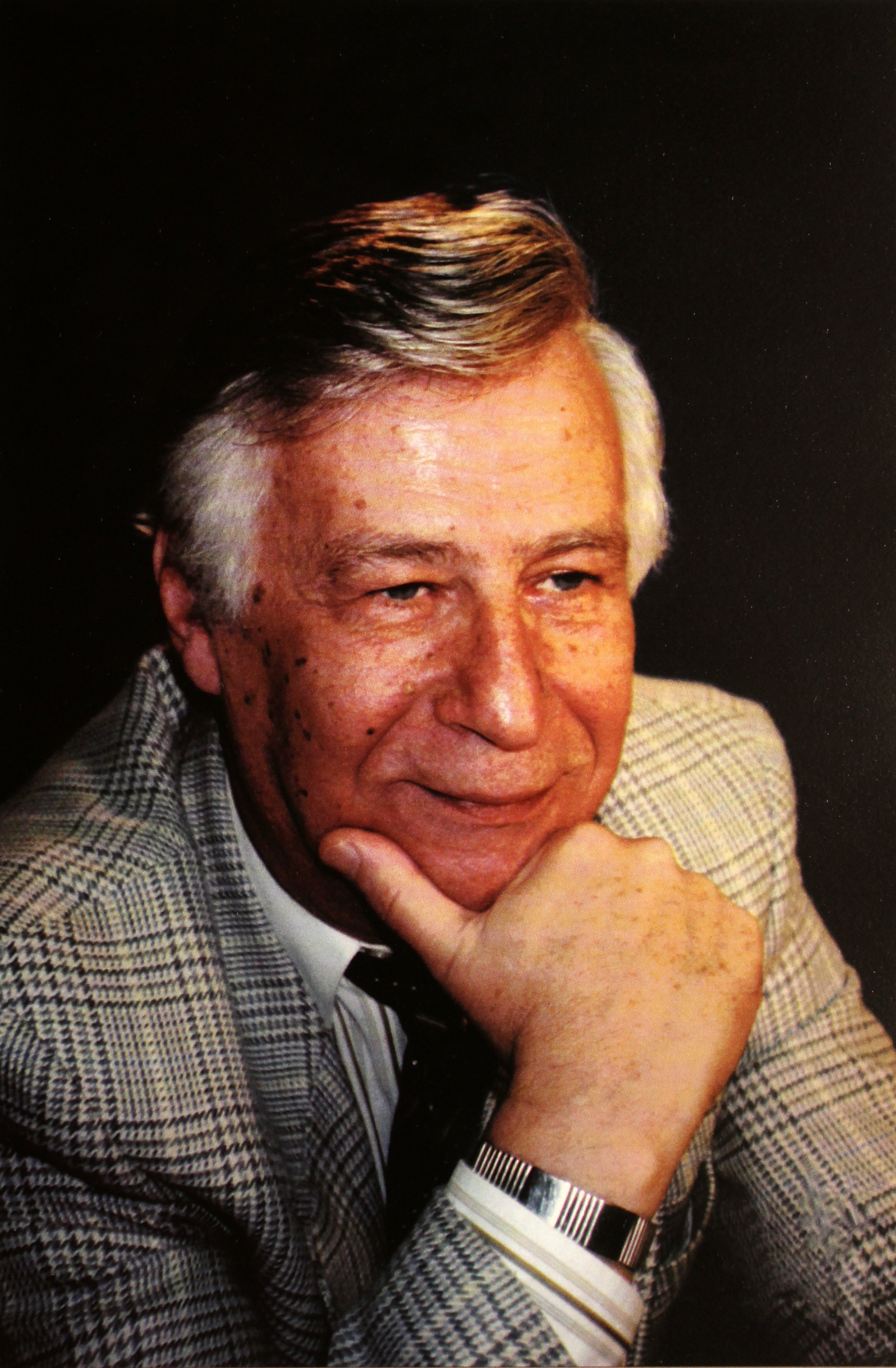

Minister of Culture of Armenia
- In office 1990–1991

Personal details
- Born: July 18, 1938 Alexandria, Egypt
- Died: August 21, 2017 (aged 79) Yerevan, Armenia
- Education: Aghayan School, Yerevan; Pyatigorsk Institute of Foreign Languages, Moscow
- Occupation: Playwright; Screenwriter

Perch Zeytuntsyan (Armenian: Պերճ Արմենակի Զեյթունցյան; July 18, 1938 – August 21, 2017) was an Armenian playwright and screenwriter who served as the Minister of Culture of Armenia from 1990 to 1991.

== Early life and works ==
Zeytuntsyan was born in Alexandria, Egypt in 1938. In the aftermath of World War II, his family moved to Soviet Armenia during a period of intense economic hardship. Zeytuntsyan attended the Aghayan School in Yerevan and it was during this period that he published his first short story “Nvere” [The Gift] (1953). Several years later, he published his first collection, Nra arajin enkere [His First Companion]. The latter work won him critical acclaim, after which he published a series of novels and novellas, including Mer taghi dzaynere [Sounds of Our Neighborhood] (1959), Mezanitz heto [After Us] (1963), Parizi hamar [For Paris] (1965), Klod Robert Isrli kam xx dari legend [Claude Robert Eatherly or a Twentieth-Century Legend] (1975), Arshak Erkrord [Arshak the Second], Verjin arevagale [The Last Dawn] (1989), and Goghatsvats Dzyune [The Stolen Snow] (1995). Since their publication, many of these works have been translated into Russian, Czech, Bulgarian, Hungarian, and the languages of the Baltic Republics.

== Theatrical works ==
Zeytuntsyan wrote his first theatrical work, Amenatkhur marde [The Saddest Man], in 1974. The work was a tragicomedy staged in Yerevan, and since then, ten of his plays have been produced and later published in the Armenian Republic. These include Avervats kaghaki araspele [The Legend of the Ruined City] (1975), Astvatsneri kanche [The Call of the Gods], Anavart menakhosutyun [Unfinished Monologue] (1981), Mec Irutyune [The Great Silence] (1984), Otki, datarann e galis [All Rise, The Court is in Session] (1988), and Tsnvel e u mahatsel [Born and Died] (1995).

== Themes and subject matter ==
A recurrent theme in Zeytuntsyan's works has been the relationship between the individual, society, and the exercise of authority. The majority of his plays draw their subject matter from Armenian history, particularly historical episodes that are relevant to contemporary issues. One major theme in his more recent prose and theatrical works is the Armenian genocide in the Ottoman Empire, reflecting the growth of nationalism in the Armenian Republic towards the end of Soviet rule. His novel the Last Dawn as well as his plays The Great Silence and All Rise, the Court Is in Session explore these themes. These plays have often been performed in both Armenia and different areas of the Armenian Diaspora.

== Film and recent works ==
After graduating from an advanced screenwriting course in Moscow in 1964, Zeytuntsyan worked at the Hayfilm center in Yerevan, later becoming the senior editor of the art film section of the Yerevan studio for television films from 1968 to 1975. The film Erevanyan oreri khronika [Chronicle of Yerevan Days] (1973) was based on his screenplay. He also went on to write a number of speeches and newspaper articles focusing on sociopolitical issues affecting the Armenian Republic. One collection of these works, titled Tsulere der ayntegh en [The Bulls Are Still There] (1990) won the Golden Pen Award of the Republic's Union of Journalists. He has since received myriad accolades, including the State Prize of Armenian SSR, the republic's highest award.

In 1975, Zeytuntsyan became the executive secretary of the Writer's Union of Armenia, a position he held until 1981. He went on to become the Minister of Culture in the first post-Soviet administration of the Republic of Armenia.
