= Isahak Isahakyan =

1st Chairman of the Central Bank of Armenia
- In office 1986–1994
- Succeeded by: Bagrat Asatryan

Vice Chairman of the State Bank of the Armenian SSR
- In office 1978–1986
- Preceded by: Vladimir Aghasyan

Personal details
- Born: 10 August 1933 Kurgan, Soviet Union
- Died: 16 February 2017 (aged 83) Yerevan, Armenia

Isahak Isahakyan (Armenian: Իսահակ Իսահակյան; 10 August 1933 – 16 February 2017) was the Vice Chairman of the Yerevan Office of the State Bank of the Armenian SSR from 1978 to 1986. After Armenia gained its independence from the Soviet Union, he became the first Chairman of the Central Bank of Armenia until 1994. Subsequently, he was an advisor to the Chairman of the Central Bank of Armenia.
