= 2022 Yerevan explosion =

Fatal fire in Yerevan, Armenia

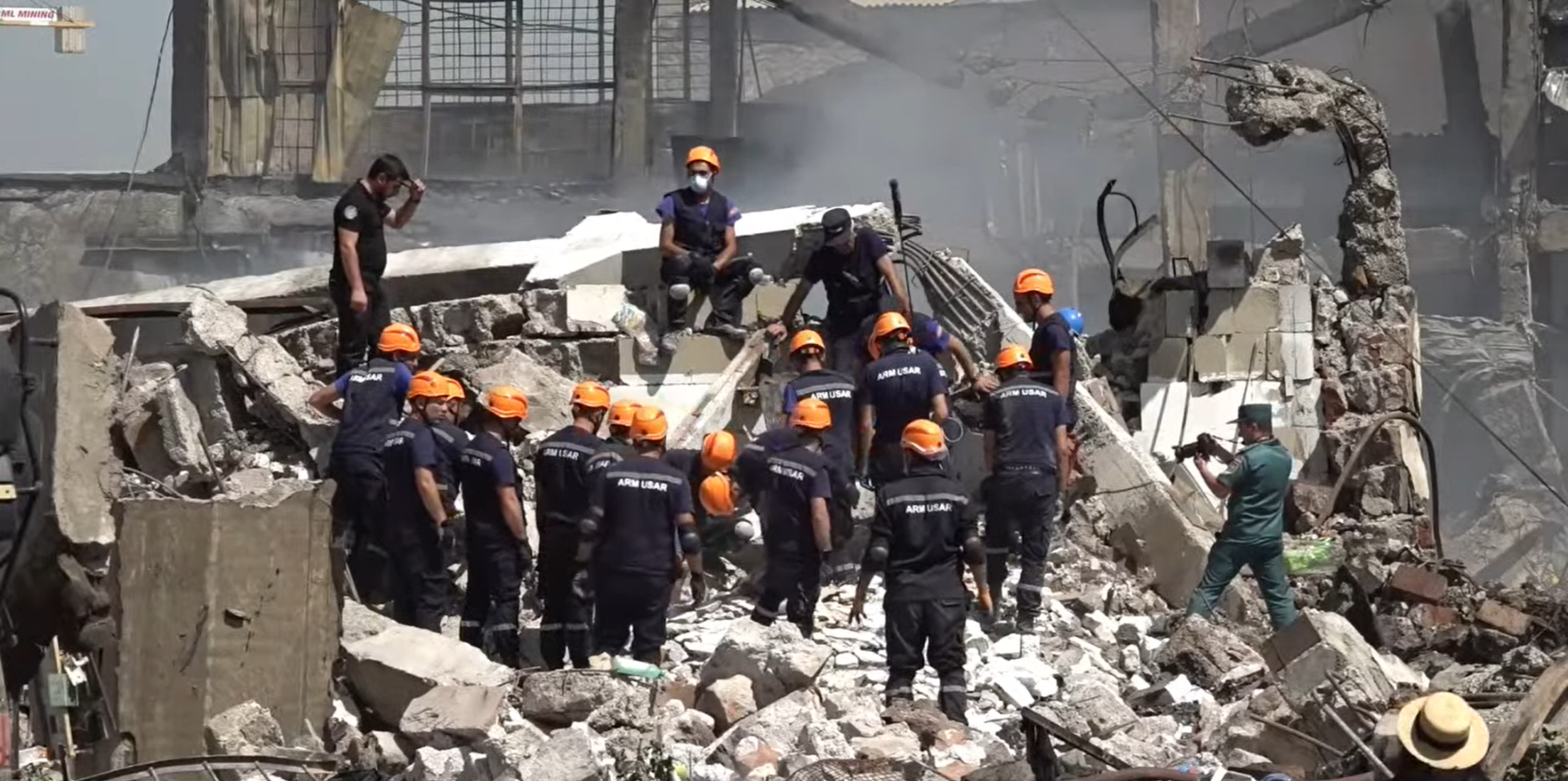
- First responders on the scene
- Date: 14 August 2022
- Time: 13:23 (AMT)
- Venue: "Surmalu" shopping centre
- Location: Yerevan, Armenia; 40°09′54.8″N 44°30′28.2″E
- Type: Explosion and fire
- Cause: Under investigation
- Deaths: 16
- Injuries: 63
- Missing: 2

At 1:23 pm local time on 14 August 2022, there was a large explosion in the Surmalu shopping centre in the Armenian capital of Yerevan. It caused widespread destruction and fires, leaving 16 dead, 63 injured and 2 missing. The explosion killed 16 people and injured 63, with nine missing as of 20 August.

== Events ==
The explosion occurred at a fireworks warehouse which tore through the Surmalu shopping centre in Yerevan. A large fire ensued and destroyed much of the market. 200 firefighters attended the scene.

== Response ==
The victims were named the following day. Prime Minister Nikol Pashinyan visited the scene of the blast with Mayor of Yerevan Hrachya Sargsyan, Minister of Emergency Situations Armen Pambukhchyan, director of the rescue service Armen Gasparyan, and head of the Office of Coordination of Inspection Bodies Artur Asoyan.
