= Mkhchyan =

Mkhchyan Մխչյան
- Location within Armenia Location within Ararat
- Coordinates: 40°01′12″N 44°29′28″E
- Country: Armenia
- Province: Ararat
- Municipality: Artashat

Population (2011)
  - Total: 4,535
- Time zone: UTC+4
  - Summer (DST): UTC+5

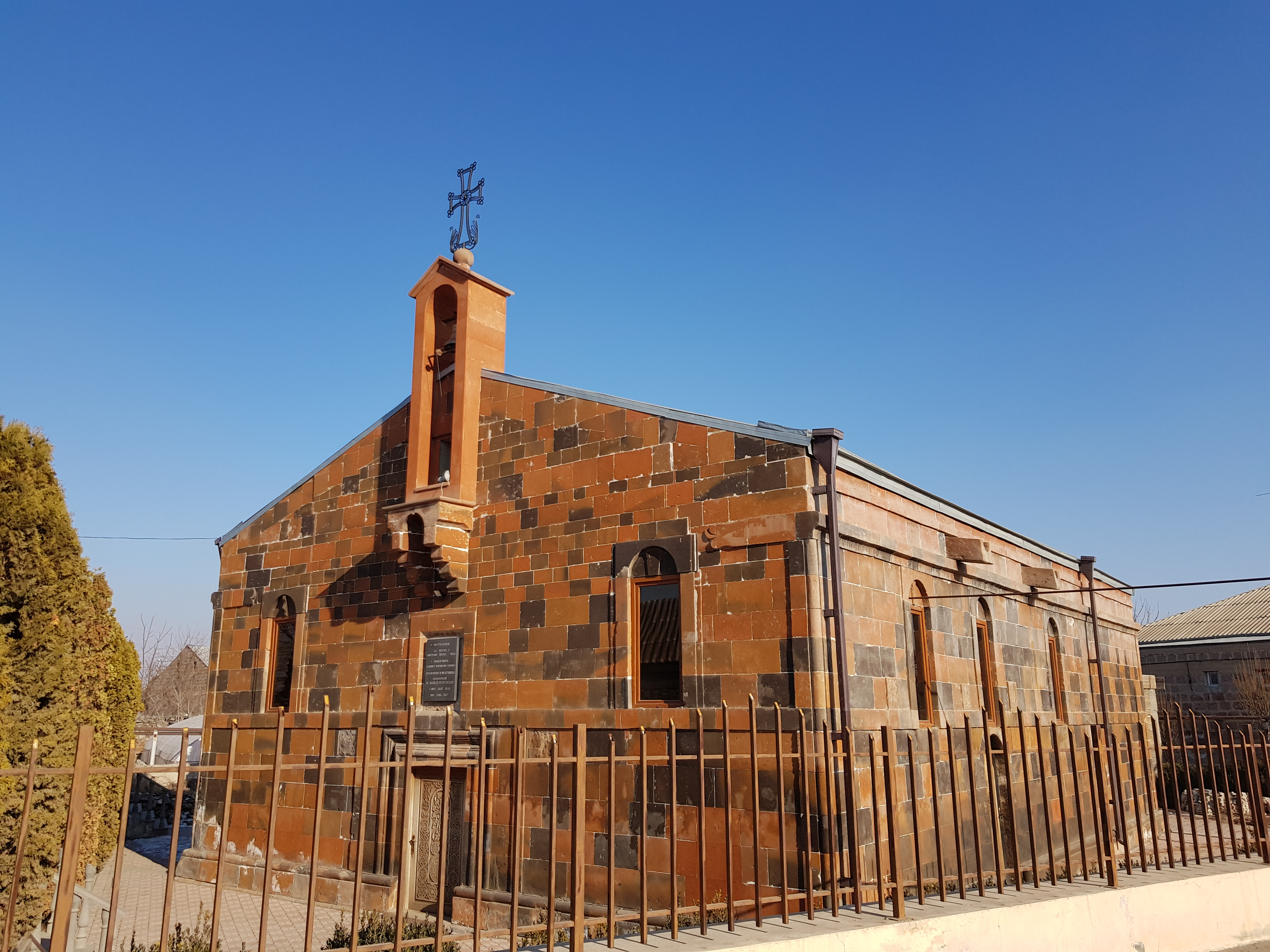
St. Hovhannes Church, Mkhchyan by ArmAg

Mkhchyan (Armenian: Մխչյան) is a village in the Artashat Municipality of the Ararat Province of Armenia near the Armenia–Turkey border. The town is named after Liparit Mkchyan, a Soviet commander killed in 1921.
