= Christian Democratic Union of Armenia =

Armenian political party

Christian Democratic Union of Armenia Հայաստանի Քրիստոնեա-դեմոկրատական միություն
- Abbreviation: CDU
- Leader: Khosrov Harutyunyan
- Founded: 1991
- Headquarters: Yerevan
- Ideology: Christian democracy
- European affiliation: European Christian Political Party

The Christian Democratic Union of Armenia (CDU) (Armenian: Հայաստանի Քրիստոնեա-դեմոկրատական միություն, romanized: Hayastani K’ristonea-demokratakan miut’yun (HKDM)) is a political party in Armenia.

== History ==
The party was founded in 1991. It is led by Khosrov Harutyunyan, former Prime Minister of Armenia (1992–1993). The party is a member of the European Christian Political Party.

The party participated in the 1995 Armenian parliamentary elections as part of the "Republican Bloc" alliance. The CDU won one seat in the National Assembly.

The party participated in the 2003 Armenian parliamentary election, winning just 0.67% of the vote and failing to gain any seats in the National Assembly.

On 7 October 2009, the party participated in an international conference organized by the European Christian Political Movement. Opportunities and challenges of the development of Christian democracy in Eastern Europe was discussed. A decision was made to establish the "Association of Christian-Democrats of Eastern Europe" in order to strengthen ties and cooperation between sister parties in Europe.

The party nominated one member to participate in the 2012 Armenian parliamentary election on the Republican Party of Armenia electoral list.

On 27 August 2015, Chairman Harutyunyan met with former President of Armenia Serzh Sargsyan to discuss political issues in Armenia.

In 2016, the party participated in municipal elections in the city of Gyumri in an electoral alliance with the Republican Party of Armenia.

During the 2022 Armenian protests, the party signed a joint declaration with 14 other political parties opposing the implementation of the 2020 Nagorno-Karabakh ceasefire agreement.

The party does not maintain any representation within the National Assembly and currently acts as an extra-parliamentary force.

== Ideology ==
The party supports strengthening regional security and stability, normalizing relations between Turkey and Armenia, reaching a fair settlement to the Nagorno-Karabakh conflict, supporting the gradual European integration of Armenia, and maintaining a strategic partnership with Russia.

Following the 2020 Nagorno-Karabakh war, the party supported the decision to maintain Russian peacekeepers in Artskah.

== See also ==
- Programs of political parties in Armenia
