= Khosrov Harutyunyan =

Armenian politician

- Խոսրով Հարությունյան
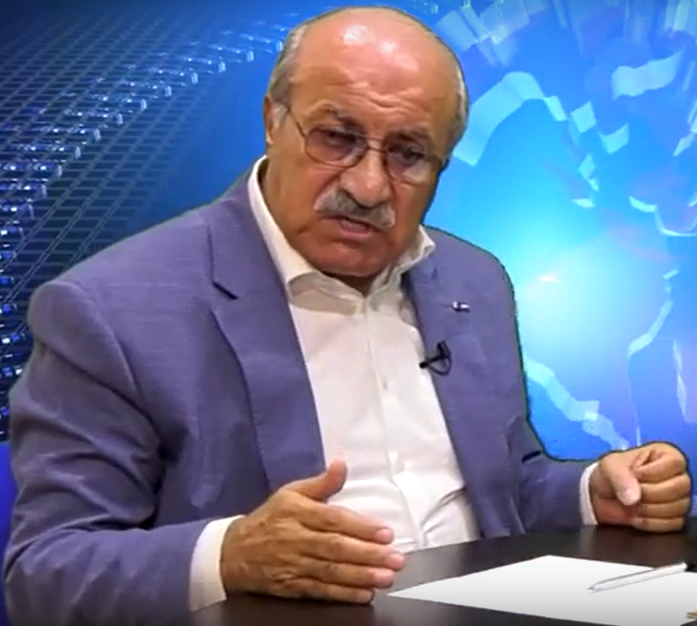
- Harutyunyan in 2021

President of the National Assembly
- In office February 4, 1998 – June 11, 1999
- Preceded by: Babken Ararktsyan
- Succeeded by: Karen Demirchyan

3rd Prime Minister of Armenia
- In office July 30, 1992 – February 2, 1993
- President: Levon Ter-Petrosyan
- Preceded by: Gagik Harutyunyan
- Succeeded by: Hrant Bagratyan

Leader of the Christian Democratic Union of Armenia
- Incumbent
- Assumed office 2002
- Preceded by: Anaida Martirosyan

Personal details
- Born: May 30, 1948 (age 78) Yerevan, Armenian SSR, Soviet Union
- Party: Christian Democratic Union of Armenia

Khosrov Meliki Harutyunyan (Armenian: Խոսրով Մելիքի Հարությունյան; born 30 May 1948) is an Armenian politician who served as the Prime Minister of Armenia from 30 July 1992 until 2 February 1993. Harutyunyan is the Chairman of the Christian Democratic Union of Armenia.

== Early Life, education and career ==
He attended Yerevan Polytechnic Institute from 1966 to 1972 after which he returned to for postgraduate studies from 1978 and 1982, majoring in mechanical engineering. In 1972, he became an engineer at the Byurakan Optical-Mechanical Laboratory of the Academy of Sciences of the Armenian Soviet Socialist Republic, serving there until 1977. He then transitioned to the academy's Institute of Radiophysics and Electronics, working from 1977 to 1984. In 1984, he heading the production and dispatching department of the Armavto production association. He then moved into light industry management, serving as the Director of the Ashtarak knitwear factory from 1984 to 1986, followed by a tenure as Director of the Charentsavan Sewing Factory from 1986 to 1987.

== Political career (1987–2002) ==
=== Local government and premiership ===
His political career began in local governance when he was appointed chairman of the Charentsavan City Executive Committee, a position he held from 1987 to 1990. In 1990, he transitioned to national politics and was elected as a Deputy of the Supreme Council of the Armenian SSR, serving until 1992. From 1992 to 1993, he served as the Prime Minister of Armenia.

=== Legislature ===
Following his premiership, he was elected as a member of parliament, serving from 1993 to 1996. During this legislative term, he became the secretary of the Supreme Council of Armenia's standing committee on financial, credit, and budgetary issues.

Between 1996 and 1998, he was chief advisor to the prime ministers Armen Sarkissian and Robert Kocharyan. In 1998, he was elevated to President of the National Assembly, a major legislative leadership role he held until 1999 when he was succeeded by Karen Demirchyan after the parliamentary elections. He joined the cabinet from 1999 to 2000 as the Minister of Territorial Administration of Armenia. Following his ministerial work, from 2000 to 2002, he was deputy chairman of the state commission dedicated to celebrating the 1700th anniversary of the Christianization of Armenia.

== Later life (2009–present) ==
He returned to public life in 2009, becoming a member of the Public Council of Armenia. On May 6, 2012, he formally returned to the National Assembly as a member from the Republican Party of Armenia after the 2012 Armenian parliamentary election.

== Awards ==
- Medal of Movses Khorenatsi
- Medal “For Strengthening Parliamentary Cooperation” (November 27, 2014, CIS Interparliamentary Assembly)
- Medal “IPA CIS. 25 years” (March 27, 2017, Interparliamentary Assembly of the CIS)'

Political offices
Preceded by Gagik Harutyunyan	Prime Minister of Armenia; 1992–1993	Succeeded by Hrant Bagratyan
Preceded by Babken Ararktsyan	President of the National Assembly of Armenia; 1998–1999	Succeeded by Karen Demirchyan
