= Gagik Harutyunyan =

Armenian politician (born 1948)

- Գագիկ Հարությունյան
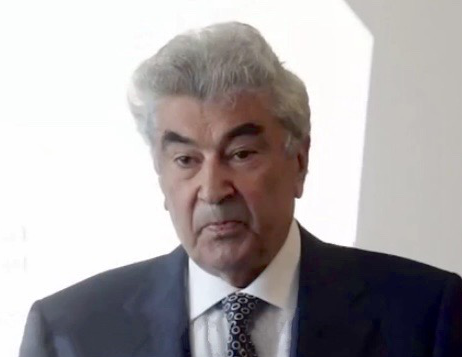
- Harutyunyan in 2014

President of the Constitutional Court of Armenia
- In office 1996–2018
- President: Levon Ter-Petrosyan; Robert Kocharyan; Serzh Sargsyan
- Succeeded by: Hrayr Tovmasyan

2nd Prime Minister of Armenia
- In office 22 November 1991 – 30 July 1992
- President: Levon Ter-Petrosyan
- Preceded by: Vazgen Manukyan
- Succeeded by: Khosrov Harutyunyan

Vice President of Armenia
- In office 16 October 1991 – 6 February 1996
- President: Levon Ter-Petrosyan
- Preceded by: post established
- Succeeded by: post abolished

Personal details
- Born: 23 March 1948 (age 78) Geghashen, Armenian SSR, Soviet Union
- Party: none (formerly Communist Party of Armenia)
- Education: Yerevan State University

Gagik Garushi Harutyunyan (Armenian: Գագիկ Գարուշի Հարությունյան; born 23 March 1948) is an Armenian politician and jurist who served as the president of the Constitutional Court of Armenia from 1996 to 2018. He served as Prime Minister of Armenia from 22 November 1991 to 30 July 1992.

Harutyunyan was elected as Vice President of Levon Ter-Petrossian and served from 11 November 1991 until February 1996, when the post was abolished by the new constitution. As replacement, the National Assembly elected him as the president of the center of constitutional law of Armenia.

Political offices
Preceded by Vazgen Manukyan	Prime Minister of Armenia; 1991–1992	Succeeded by Khosrov Harutyunyan
Preceded by Position established	Vice President of Armenia; 1991–1996	Succeeded by Position abolished
