= Gagik Stamboltsyan =

Armenian politician (1957–2026)

Gagik Grigori Stamboltsyan (Armenian: Գագիկ Գրիգորի Ստամբոլցյան; 18 June 1957 – 28 June 2026) was an Armenian politician.

== Life and career ==
Stamboltsyan was born in Yerevan on 18 June 1957. He served as the minister of health between 1997 and 1998.

Stamboltsyan died on 28 June 2026, at the age of 69.
