= Hrayr Tovmasyan =

Armenian politician (born 1970)

- Հրայր Թովմասյան
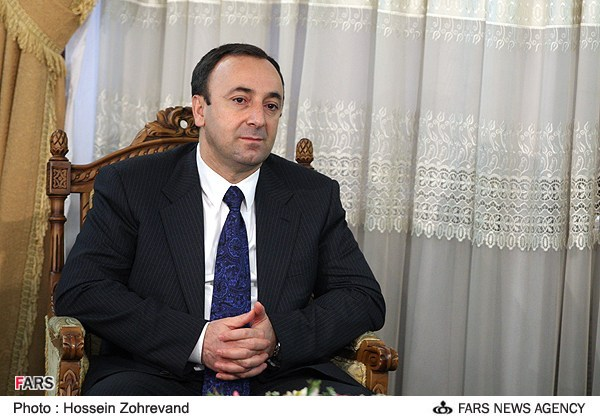

President of the Constitutional Court of Armenia
- In office 21 March 2018 – 26 June 2020
- Preceded by: Gagik Harutyunyan
- Succeeded by: Ashot Khachatryan (acting)

Member of the National Assembly of Armenia
- In office 20 May 2017 – 16 February 2018
- Parliamentary group: Republican Party

Minister of Justice of Armenia
- In office 17 December 2010 – 30 April 2014
- Preceded by: Gevorg Danielyan
- Succeeded by: Hovhannes Manukyan

Personal details
- Born: July 8, 1970 (age 55) Darakert, Armenian SSR, Soviet Union
- Children: 3

Hrayr Tovmasyan (Armenian: Հրայր Թովմասյան; born 8 July 1970) is the former President of the Constitutional Court of Armenia, the former Minister of Justice and a Member of the National Assembly.
