= Ministry of Health (Armenia) =

Government ministry of Armenia

Ministry of Health of Armenia
- Հայաստանի առողջապահության նախարարություն

Agency overview
- Formed: 1918
- Jurisdiction: Government of Armenia
- Headquarters: Government Building 3, Yerevan 0010, Yerevan
- Minister responsible: Anahit Avanesyan, Minister of Health
- Website: moh.am

The Ministry of Health of Armenia (Armenian: Հայաստանի առողջապահության նախարարություն) is a republican body of executive authority, which elaborates and implements the policies of the Government of Armenia in the healthcare sector.

== Former Ministers ==
- Mihran Nazaryan (1990-1991)
- Ara Babloyan (1991-1997)
- Gagik Stamboltsyan (1997-1998)
- Hayk Nikoghusyan (1998-2000)
- Ararat Mkrtchyan (2000-2003)
- Norayr Davityan (2003-2007)
- Harutyun Kushkyan (2007-2012)
- Derenik Dumanyan (2012-2014)
- Armen Muradyan (2014-2016)
- Levon Altonyan (2016-2018)
- Arsen Torosyan (2018–January 2021)
- Anahit Avanesian (January 2021 – present)

== See also ==
- Health in Armenia
