= Hovik Abrahamyan =

Armenian politician (born 1959)

- Հովիկ Աբրահամյան
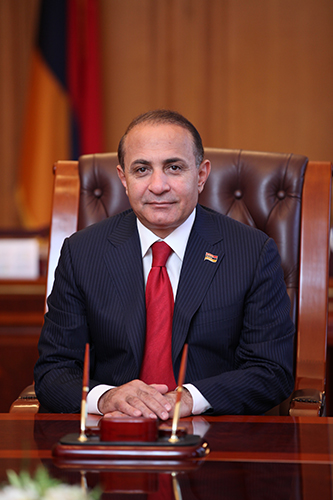
- Official portrait, 2012

13th Prime Minister of Armenia
- In office 13 April 2014 – 13 September 2016
- President: Serzh Sargsyan
- Preceded by: Tigran Sargsyan
- Succeeded by: Karen Karapetyan

President of the National Assembly
- In office 31 May 2012 – 13 April 2014
- Preceded by: Samvel Nikoyan
- Succeeded by: Galust Sahakyan
- In office 28 September 2008 – 21 November 2011
- Preceded by: Hrayr Karapetyan (Acting)
- Succeeded by: Samvel Nikoyan

Personal details
- Born: Hovik Argami Abrahamyan; 24 January 1959 (age 67) Mkhchyan, Armenian SSR, Soviet Union
- Party: Republican Party
- Education: Armenian State University of Economics

Hovik Argami Abrahamyan (Armenian: Հովիկ Արգամի Աբրահամյան; born 24 January 1959), also known by the nickname Muk (Armenian: Մուկ), is an Armenian politician, former member of the ruling Republican Party, he was the prime minister of Armenia from 13 April 2014 to 8 September 2016. Previously he was the president of the National Assembly of Armenia.

== Early life ==
Abrahamyan, born in Mkhchyan village in Armenia's Ararat Province, began his professional career in 1990 as the department head of the Burastan Brandy Factory and later as the president of Artashat wine-brandy factory. In 1995 he became a member of the Armenian parliament. He became Mayor of Artashat in 1996, and the governor of Ararat Province in 1998.

== Political career ==
Under President Robert Kocharyan's administration, in 2005 he was appointed Minister of the Territorial Administration (which oversees regional government structures), serving until 2008 when he resigned in order to be appointed in April 2008 by the newly elected president Serzh Sargsyan as head of his presidential staff. In August 2008 he was re-elected in an uncontested election (in a seat vacated by the resignation of Abrahamian's older brother, Henrikto) to the National Assembly (fourth convocation), and in September 2008 he was elected as President of the National Assembly of Armenia. He resigned as president in November 2011 and was re-elected to the National Assembly on 6 May 2012 as a member of the Republican Party of Armenia. He opposed his predecessor's asset declaration draft law that would have required Armenian politicians and senior public officials to declare their business holdings and business interests.

=== Prime minister ===
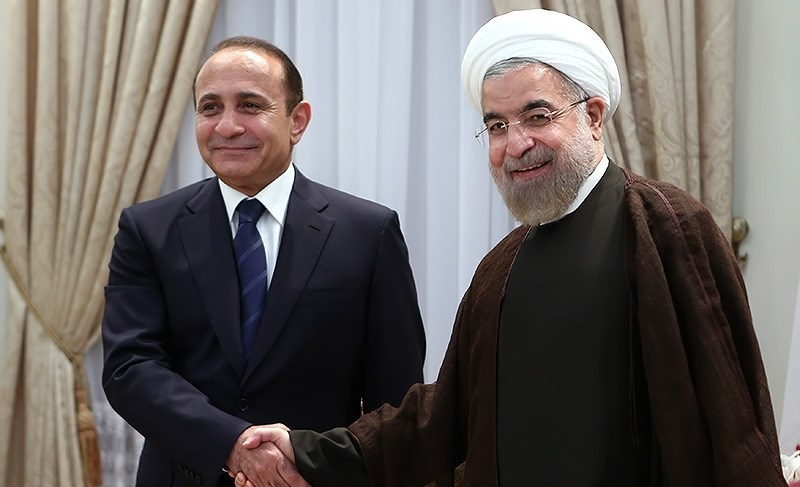
Abrahamyan with Iranian president Hassan Rouhani in Tehran, 30 September 2014

He was appointed as prime minister in April 2014 following the resignation of Tigran Sargsyan. Abrahamyan was nominated for the role of prime minister by President Serzh Sargsyan calling him a "very effective new prime minister." He was congratulated by Russian prime minister Dmitry Medvedev.

== Public image ==
In various cables sent in 2008, Joseph Pennington, Deputy Chief of Mission at the US Embassy in Yerevan, characterized Abrahamyan as being "regarded by outside observers – and many Armenians – as an unpolished, poorly educated and parochial figure, a crass nouveau riche whose brand of dirty-money politics, abuse of state "administrative resources", and cunning opportunism is in the worst tradition of recent Armenian politics", as "an oily, machine politician ... at the center of a purposeful effort to abuse agencies and offices of local government to arm-twist every vote he possibly can for the prime minister", the "chief operating officer of the dirtiest and most coercive tactics of Serzh Sargsian's presidential election campaign", and "an unsophisticated thug" whose "instincts are not progressive".

Also in 2008, US Ambassador to Armenia Marie Yovanovitch described Abrahamian as a politician who uses his political power to promote his business interests. He has also been reported as owning more than two dozen companies, including three sand mines on the Araks river; 1,500 hectares of grape fields in Artashat; more than 10 gas stations outside Yerevan; one third of "Ararat Cement"; casinos; petrol stations; and a $7 million summer home in the Crimea. He opposed his predecessor's asset declaration draft law that would have required Armenian politicians and senior public officials to declare their business holdings and business interests.

Abrahamyan's son, Argam, is married to a daughter of Gagik Tsarukyan, oligarch and Prosperous Armenia party leader.

== Criminal Prosecution ==
After the change of power in Armenia – in which opposition leader Nikol Pashinyan became prime minister – a large-scale fight against corruption was announced. A number of criminal cases were initiated against many former top officials, including the former president Robert Kocharian and the late prime minister Hovik Abrahamyan.

At the end of August 2018, the late prime minister Hovik Abrahamyan, his brother Henrik (who was arrested on 8 August 2008 on charges of illegal possession of weapons), and former chief Police of Armenia from 2008 to 2011 Alik Sargsyan were defendants in a criminal case. In a statement by the director of Avazaatik Ltd. (a company which operates a sand pit in the village of Noramarg, Ararat region of Armenia) high-ranking officials demanded 60% of shares with registration of these shares given to two individuals in 2008. 30% of the shares were registered in the name of Hovik Abrahamyan's brother Henrik (Jonik), who later sold his shares.

At the same time, the Avazaatik company was involved in lawsuits initiated by the former head of Noramagh Sarkis Galstyan, who was seeking to terminate a contract between the Noramagha community and the company. This case involved five hectares of agricultural land within the administrative territory of the community. In 2012, the Avazaatik company was granted permission to develop a quarry in the Noramarg community. Henrik (Jonik) Abrahamyan was arrested after a search of a former factory in the territory located in the village of Mkhchyan discovered a large number of weapons and ammunition, including 3 light machine guns, 7 machine guns AK-74, 2 SVD sniper rifles, 3 different types of rifles, 2 pistols and a large number of bullets of different caliber. This factory was de facto owned by the former prime minister Hovik Abrahamyan, registered in the name of Ambik Gevorgyan, and was the framework in the case for dispersing demonstrations on 1 March 2008.

In June 2019, the Special Investigative Service of Armenia reported that the preliminary investigation in the criminal case against Hovik Abrahamyan, based on the sale of 15 land plots in Dilijan communities (land plots with an area of 15 thousand sq.m and 57 thousand sq.m on Babajanyan Street, and plots along Saralanja street with an area of 731, 761, 701 and 720 sq.m): Mkhchyan (land plots with an area of 8.9 hectares, 9.1 hectares, 8 hectares, 9 hectares, 5.6 hectares, 7.2 hectares and industrial territory with a total area of 4092 sq.m) and Narek (land plot with an area of 90 hectares and pasture of 30 hectares) without holding auctions and by issuing false documents. Despite the expiration of the statute of limitations for criminal prosecution in a number of cases, decisions sent to the Ministry of Territorial Administration and Infrastructure of Armenia to annul the previously concluded transactions sought to return these land plots to the communities.

== Income ==
At the end of 2013, the total income for Hovik Abrahamyan and his wife Juliet exceeded $6 million. Earlier, he declared the income was from the sale of agricultural products from 2011 to 2013 in the amount of 125 million AMD (about $290,000.00). During the specified period, his wife Juliet received 138 million drams (about $318,000.00). Nikol Pashinyan asked about the origin of Abrahamyan's fortune despite the fact that he didn’t conduct business in that area.

While running for parliament in 2012, Hovik Abrahamyan declared the following: an apartment with an area of 276 sq.m on Tumanyan Street in Yerevan, an apartment with an area of 146 sq.m on Shmidt Street, an apartment with an area of 260 sq.m on Teryan Street, and a garage with an area of 18 sq.m.

Abrahamyan declared the same properties in 2014 when he took office as Prime Minister of Armenia. During this time, a number of media outlets indicated other properties belonging to the relatives of Hovik Abrahamyan, in particular, his brother Henrik and others. According to Hetq.am, Hovik Abrahamyan and Tigran Arzakantsyan, Deputy of the National Assembly of Armenia, founded Paramount Gold Mining Ltd., a company which develops the Lusajur section of the Meghradzor gold deposit in the Kotayk region. According to Arzakantsyan, he is the sole proprietor.

Government offices
Preceded by Tigran Sargsyan	Prime Minister of Armenia; 2014–2016	Succeeded by Karen Karapetyan
