= Galust Sahakyan =

Armenian politician (1949–2022)

- Գալուստ Սահակյան
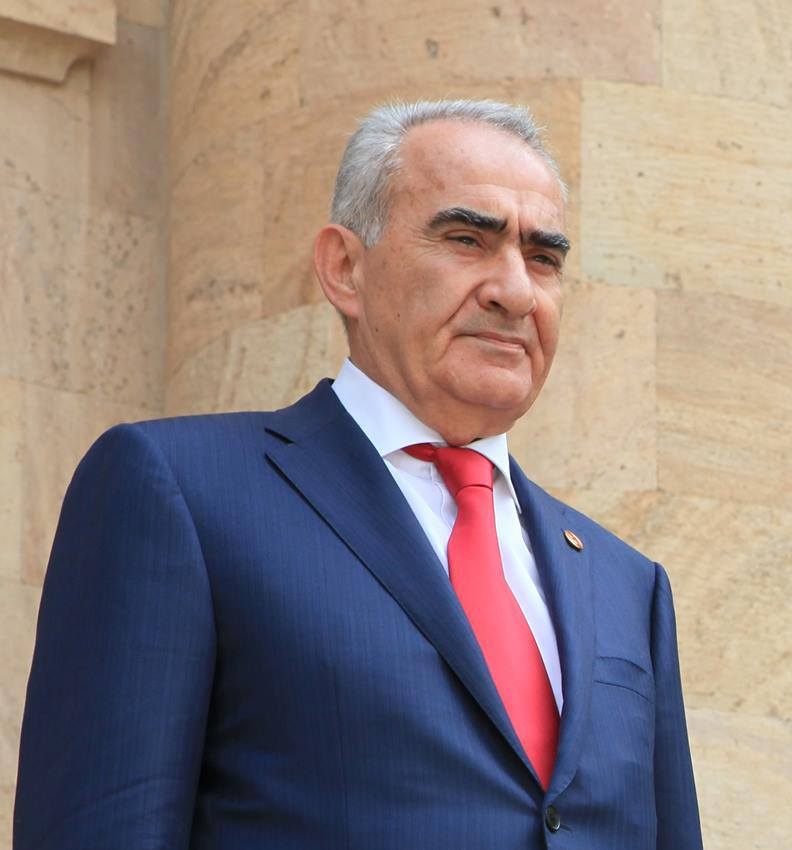
- Sahakyan in 2014

President of National Assembly
- In office 29 April 2014 – 18 May 2017
- President: Serzh Sargsyan
- Preceded by: Hovik Abrahamyan
- Succeeded by: Ara Babloyan

Member of the National Assembly
- In office 1995–2018

Personal details
- Born: 8 April 1949 Yerevan, Armenian SSR, USSR
- Died: 18 December 2022 (aged 73)
- Party: Republican Party of Armenia
- Children: 2
- Education: Yerevan State University

Galust Grigorii Sahakyan (Armenian:Գալուստ Գրիգորիի Սահակյան; 8 April 1949 – 18 December 2022) was an Armenian politician and statesman, who served as MP, and the President of the National Assembly of Armenia.

== Career ==
Galust Sahakyan was born on 8 April 1949 in Yerevan. He graduated with a degree in philology from Yerevan State University in 1971.

From 1970 to 1972 he was a metalworker in the Yerevan Silk Complex. For the next nineteen years he worked as a teacher at Yerevan School #30, then as a deputy to the headmaster at School #94 then School #153; thereafter he was headmaster at School #3 and then School #185. From 1991 to 1996 he was first the deputy and later chairman of the Executive Committee of Mashtots District Council in Yerevan.

1995 to 1999 was his first term as a deputy in the National Assembly of Armenia (NA), representing electoral district #32. He was a member of the NA Standing Committee on Science, Education, Culture and Youth Affairs. He was first a member of the Republic Faction and later the Yerkrapah Deputy Group.

1999 to 2003 was his second term as a deputy of the NA as a member of the Unity Bloc. He served as deputy chairman of the NA Standing Committee on Science, Education, Culture and Youth Affairs. He was first a member and later leader of the Unity Faction.

From 2003 to 2007 he was a deputy in the NA as a member of the Republican Party of Armenia (RPA). He was a member of the NA Standing Committee on State and Legal Affairs. He was the head of the Republican Party of Armenia parliamentary faction.

From 2007 to 2012 he served another term as a deputy in the National Assembly from the Republican Party of Armenia.

From 19 June 2007 to 17 November 2008 he was a member of the Standing Committee on Defense, National Security and Internal Affairs of the National Assembly.

From 11 November 2008 to 31 May 2012 he was head of the RPA faction in parliament. He was also the Deputy Head of the Republican Party and a member of the RPA Executive Body and Council.

From 2012 to 2017 he served another term as a member of the National Assembly from the RPA.

From 31 May 2012 to 7 May 2014 he was the head of the RPA faction, RPA Deputy Head, member of the RPA Executive Body and Council.

From 29 April 2014 to 5 May 2017 he was the President of the National Assembly of Armenia.

From 2 April 2017 he was Elected Member of the National Assembly from the RPA national electoral list.

Sahakyan was a member of the board of the Republican Party of Armenia.

== Personal life and death ==
Sahakyan was married and had two children. He died in Germany on 18 December 2022, at the age of 73.

Political offices
Preceded by Hovik Abrahamyan	President of the National Assembly of Armenia; 2014–2017	Succeeded by Ara Babloyan
