= COVID-19 pandemic in Armenia =

- Disease: COVID-19
- Pathogen: SARS-CoV-2
- Location: Armenia
- First outbreak: Wuhan, Hubei, China
- Index case: Yerevan
- Arrival date: 1 March 2020 (6 years, 8 months and 1 week)
- Confirmed cases: 454,913
- Recovered: 211,634
- Deaths: 8,785
- Vaccinations: 1,150,915 (total vaccinated); 1,030,758 (fully vaccinated); 2,256,919 (doses administered)

Government website
- A Unified Information Platform for Combating Coronavirus; National Center for Disease Control and Prevention

The COVID-19 pandemic in Armenia was a part of the worldwide pandemic of coronavirus disease 2019 (COVID-19) caused by severe acute respiratory syndrome coronavirus 2 (SARS-CoV-2). The virus was confirmed to have reached Armenia on 1 March 2020 when its first case was reported. It spread to all of the regions (marz) of Armenia, and caused 8,727 deaths.

Armenia suspended visa-free travel for Chinese citizens on 1 February, shortly after it implemented a 90-day visa-free regime on 19 January. Citizens of Iran were also unable to receive a visa on arrival. Additionally, passengers who have been to most of Europe, as well as South Korea and Japan, within the past 14 days, were barred from entering Armenia. The border of Armenia with the Republic of Artsakh was closed in order to prevent the virus from spreading to the unrecognized republic (which "de facto" proclaimed its independence in a nationwide referendum on 10 December 1992).

Before the virus was confirmed to have arrived in Armenia, 118 tests were performed in February with negative results. As of 5 August 2020, Armenia is reported to have performed 1,065,211 tests, of which 222,139 were positive.

== Background ==
On 12 January 2020, the World Health Organization (WHO) confirmed that a novel coronavirus was the cause of a respiratory illness in a cluster of people in Wuhan City, Hubei Province, China, which was reported to the WHO on 31 December 2019.

The case fatality ratio for COVID-19 has been much lower than SARS of 2003, but the transmission has been significantly greater, with a significant total death toll.

== Timeline ==
=== March 2020 ===
On 1 March, Prime Minister Nikol Pashinyan confirmed the reports on his Facebook page that the COVID-19 pandemic was confirmed to have spread to Armenia.

On 16 March, Government declared a state of emergency lasting until 14 April to prevent the spread of the coronavirus. The emergency measures included the closure of all educational institutions, closing the borders with Georgia and Iran, banning gatherings with over 20 people, and postponing the 2020 Armenian constitutional referendum.

As of 18 March, in addition to 799 people in self-isolation, there were 444 people in quarantine, gathered in the Golden Palace Hotel of Tsaghkadzor and the Monte Melkonian Military College of Dilijan.

On 21 March, Armenia's Health Minister Arsen Torosyan said they have over 600 in quarantine in different regions of Armenia. He added that Armenia's capacity for quarantining people is nearing its limit, and that people should already resort to self-isolation as a preventative measure. Of the confirmed cases, 133 were linked to the clusters of cases from Ejmiatsin and a sewing factory in Yerevan.

As of 24 March, there are 235 confirmed cases. 26 patients have pneumonia, 6 of whom are in intensive care, though they are not intubated (not on artificial respirators), and are under constant supervision.

On 26 March, Armenia's Health Ministry announced the country's first death from COVID-19. The patient was a 72-year-old male Armenian citizen with multiple pre-existing conditions.

=== April 2020 ===
On 1 April, Armenia reported its 4th death.

On 6 April, Armenian Prime Minister Nikol Pashinyan announced that Armenia would start to produce COVID-19 tests at the Institute of Molecular Biology.

On 7 April, the first case of COVID-19 was reported in the unrecognized Republic of Artsakh. The person had returned from Armenia to Mirik village of the Kashatagh Province, 39 km from Berdzor and 89 km from Stepanakert and was taken by ambulance to the Kashatagh medical center on the morning of 2 April. All 17 people who had been in contact with this person, none of whom had symptoms, had self-isolated in advance for safety reasons.

=== May 2020 ===
On 4 May, the national stay-at-home order was partially lifted and non-essential businesses were allowed to reopen, provided that the businesses require customers wear masks and limit the number of customers inside stores and restaurants.

On 14 May, the country's state of emergency was extended until 13 June. However, preschools, shopping centres, and gyms reopened and public transport resumed starting from 18 May.

=== June 2020 ===
On 1 June, Prime Minister Nikol Pashinyan announced that he had tested positive for COVID-19.

=== July to December 2020 ===
Model-based simulations suggest that the 95% confidence interval for the time-varying reproduction number R_{t} was lower than 1.0 in July and August, above 1.0 in September and October, and around 1.0 in November. In September, the Armenian Government decided to impose a covid related quarantine, which is still in place.

=== July 2021 ===
In July 2021, the Armenian Health Minister Anahit Avanesian announced Armenia would be able to purchase 300'000 doses of the Novavax and 50'000 doses of the Janssen vaccine. Armenia used to provide vaccines to the people for free, Armenians and non Armenians alike. This encouraged many Iranians to cross to Armenia to get vaccinated, following which Armenia imposed restrictions on vaccines for non-residents.

== Aid ==
=== International aid ===
The countries and international organizations that have sent aid and funds to the Government of Armenia, to help fight the pandemic, includes:

- Canada: Canada provided Armenia with a $260,000 funding package to assist with COVID-19.
- China: On 8 April 2020, a batch of humanitarian aid including disposable surgical masks, protection suits, and ventilators from China arrived in Armenia.
- European Union: The EU has provided 92 million euros in aid to Armenia. In addition, the EU has supplied Armenia with 6,000 gloves, 2,300 medical masks, and provided over 3000 vulnerable citizens with care packages.
- Russia: In April 2020, the Russian military sent a team of medics and special equipment to Armenia to help authorities detect and prevent coronavirus cases among Armenian and Russian military personnel serving in the country. The equipment included a coronavirus testing lab and a sample collection system.
- Serbia: On 18 and 19 June, Serbia sent two planes with medical aid to Armenia, containing 10 artificial respiration devices, 10 monitors monitoring the patient's condition, 500,000 surgical masks, 100,000 breathing masks, 25,000 protective glasses, 25,000 medical protective clothing and other necessary items.
- United States: The United States has provided 2.7 million dollars to help strengthen laboratory capacity, improve management of severe cases, and support community level preparedness planning in Armenia. The US has also provided 1.2 million dollars to address the economic impacts of COVID-19, 1.8 million dollars for community-based social work, and an additional $200,000 to civil society and independent media organizations.
