= President of the National Assembly of Armenia =

Speaker of the House in the Parliament of Armenia

President of the National Assembly of the Republic of Armenia
- ՀՀ Ազգային ժողովի նախագահ
- Coat of Arms of Armenia
- Incumbent; Ruben Rubinyan since 3 August 2026
- Appointer: Elected by National Assembly
- Term length: coincides with the term of the assembly
- Inaugural holder: Avetik Sahakyan
- Formation: 1 August 1918
- Website: http://parliament.am

The president of the National Assembly of Armenia (Armenian: Ազգային ժողովի նախագահ, romanized: Azgayin zhoghovi naxagah) is the speaker of the house in the Parliament of Armenia. The incumbent speaker is Ruben Rubinyan, since 3 August 2026.

Predecessors of the National Assembly of Armenia were the Parliament (August 1918 – December 1920), the Supreme Soviet of the Armenian Soviet Socialist Republic (1920–1990) and the Supreme Council of Armenia (1990–1995).

== List of speakers ==
Political party

ARF PANM Rule of Law Christian Democratic Union People's Party Republican Civil Contract

=== First Republic of Armenia (1918–1920) ===
Speakers of the Parliament of the First Republic of Armenia

No.	Portrait	Name (Birth–Death)	Term of office		Political party
No.	Portrait	Name (Birth–Death)	Took office	Left office	Political party
1		Serop Zakaryan (Unknown)	30 June 1918	1 August 1918	ARF
2		Avetik Sahakyan (1863–1933)	1 August 1918	1 August 1919	ARF
3		Avetis Aharonian (1866–1948)	1 August 1919	4 November 1920	ARF
4		Hovhannes Kajaznuni (1868–1938)	4 November 1920	2 December 1920	ARF

=== Armenia (1991–present) ===
Chairmen of the Supreme Council of Armenia

No.	Portrait	Name (Birth–Death)	Term of office		Political party
No.	Portrait	Name (Birth–Death)	Took office	Left office	Political party
1		Levon Ter-Petrosyan (born 1946)	4 August 1990	11 November 1991	PANM
2		Babken Ararktsyan (1944–2023)	24 December 1991	27 July 1995	PANM

President of the National Assembly of Armenia

No.	Portrait	Name (Birth–Death)	Term of office		Political party
No.	Portrait	Name (Birth–Death)	Took office	Left office	Political party
1		Babken Ararktsyan (1944–2023)	27 July 1995	4 February 1998	PANM
2		Khosrov Harutyunyan (born 1949)	4 February 1998	11 June 1999	Christian Democratic Union of Armenia
3		Karen Demirchyan (1932–1999)	11 June 1999	27 October 1999	People's Party of Armenia
4		Armen Khachatryan (1957֊2020)	2 November 1999	12 June 2003	People's Party of Armenia
5		Artur Baghdasaryan (born 1969)	12 June 2003	1 June 2006	Rule of Law
6		Tigran Torosyan (born 1957)	1 June 2006	26 September 2008	Republican
—		Hrayr Karapetyan (acting) (born 1964)	26 September 2008	29 September 2008	ARF
7		Hovik Abrahamyan (born 1959)	29 September 2008	21 November 2011	Republican
8		Samvel Nikoyan (born 1957)	6 December 2011	31 May 2012	Republican
9		Hovik Abrahamyan (born 1959)	31 May 2012	13 April 2014	Republican
10		Galust Sahakyan (1949–2022)	29 April 2014	18 May 2017	Republican
11		Ara Babloyan (born 1947)	18 May 2017	14 January 2019	Republican
12		Ararat Mirzoyan (born 1979)	14 January 2019	2 August 2021	Civil Contract
13		Alen Simonyan (born 1980)	2 August 2021	2 August 2026	Civil Contract
14		Ruben Rubinyan (born 1990)	3 August 2026	Incumbent	Civil Contract

== See also ==
- National Assembly of Armenia
- Politics of Armenia
- President of Armenia
- President of the National Assembly of Artsakh
- Prime Minister of Armenia
- Supreme Council of Armenia
