= Pipoyan =

Pipoyan (Armenian: Պիպոյան) is an Armenian surname that may refer to the following notable people:

- Lilit Pipoyan (born 1955), Armenian musician, singer, and architect
- Rima Pipoyan (born 1988), Armenian choreographer, director, dancer and dance teacher
