= 301 in Armenia =

- Decades
- See also: Other events of 301; List of years in Armenia

The following lists events that happened during 301 in Armenia.

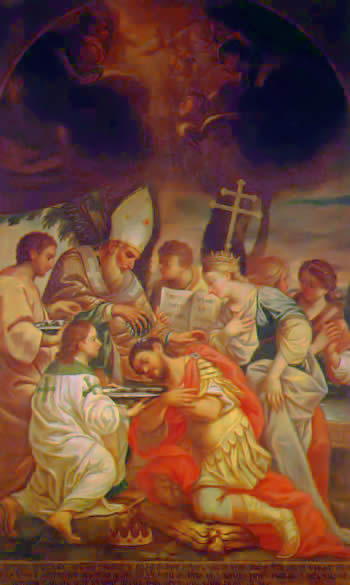
Baptism of King Tiridates III the Great

== Events ==
- King Tiridates III proclaims Christianity as the official state religion, making Armenia the first nation to adopt Christianity as its official religion (traditional date).
- Gregory the Illuminator became first Catholicos of All Armenians
- Construction of Etchmiadzin Cathedral begins
