= 303 in Armenia =

- Decades
- See also: Other events of 303; List of years in Armenia

The following lists events that happened during 303 in Armenia.

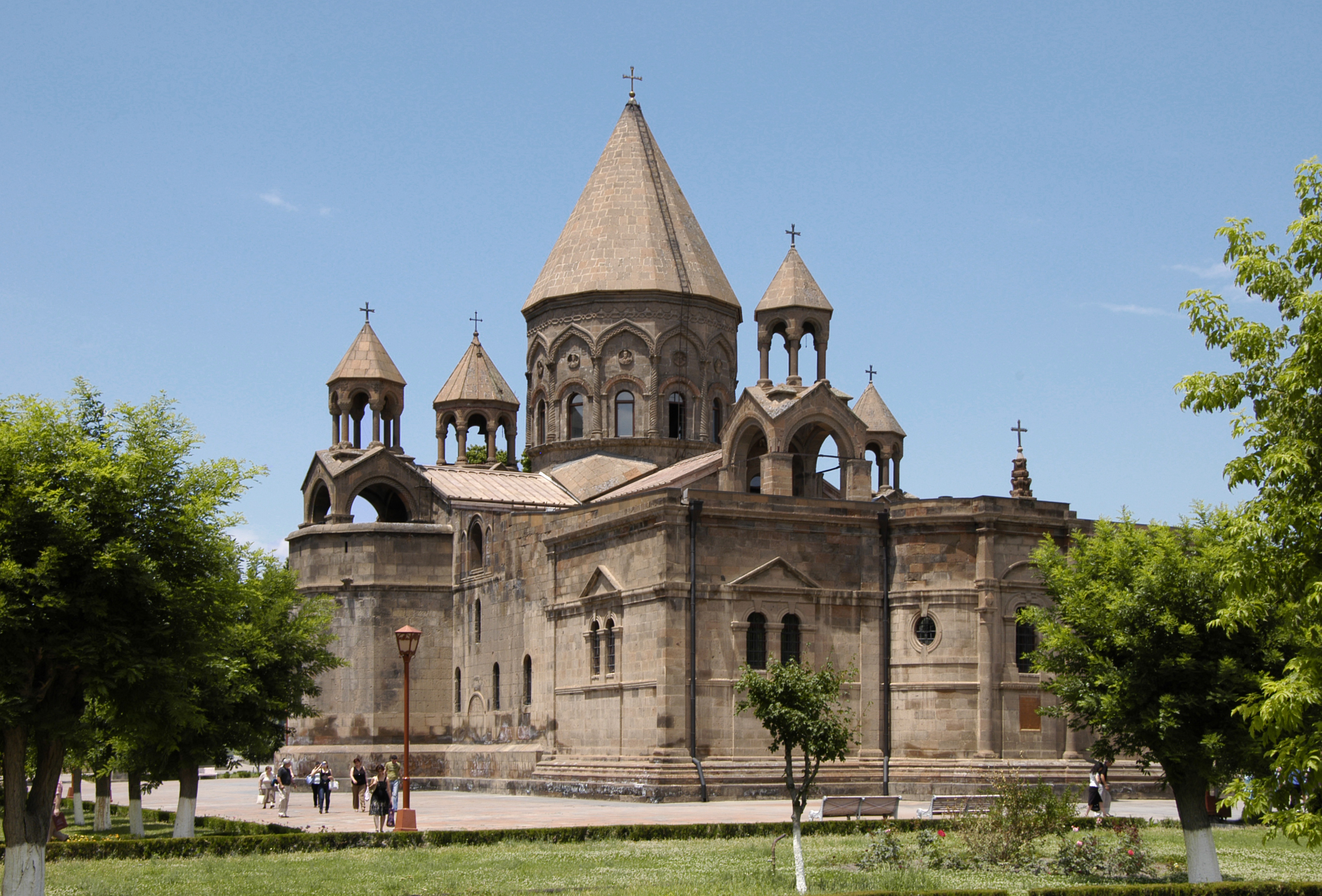
Etchmiadzin Cathedral

== Events ==
- Etchmiadzin Cathedral is completed by Gregory the Illuminator and Tiridates III of Armenia
- January 6 – Baptism of Tiridates III of Armenia
