= 1988 in Armenia =

- Decades: 1960s; 1970s; 1980s; 1990s; 2000s
- See also: Other events of 1988; List of years in Armenia

The following lists events that happened during 1988 in Armenia.

== Incumbents ==
- Prime Minister: Fadey Sargsyan

== Events ==
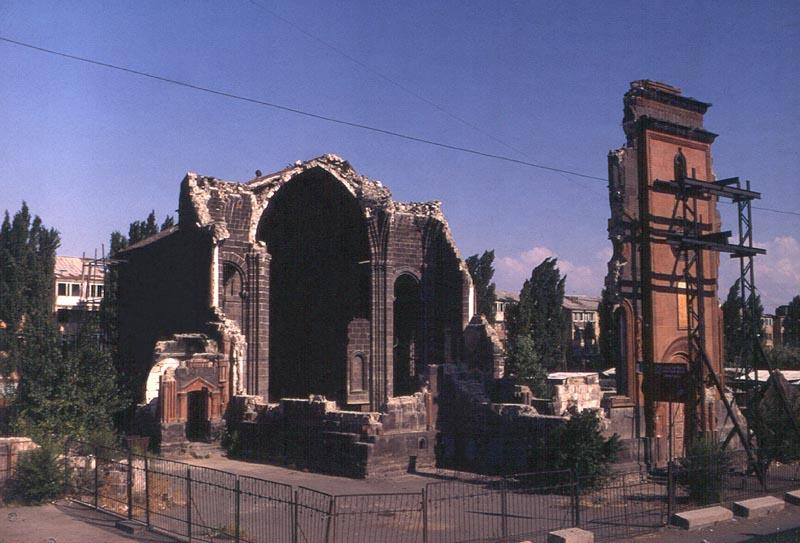
The Holy Saviour's Church in Gyumri after the Spitak earthquake

=== February ===
- February 20 – The Nagorno-Karabakh Autonomous Oblast votes to secede from the Azerbaijan Soviet Socialist Republic and join the Armenian SSR, triggering the First Nagorno-Karabakh War.

=== March ===
- March 9 – Gorbachev meets with the leaders of Armenia and Azerbaijan Karen Demirchyan and Kamran Baghirov in Moscow to discuss the public demands of unification of Armenia and Karabakh.

=== November ===
- November 20 – Soviet Armenian Supreme Council recognizes the Armenian genocide.

=== December ===
- December 7 – The 6.8 M_{s} Armenian earthquake leaves 25,000–50,000 dead and 31,000–130,000 injured.

== Births ==
- June 2 – Rima Pipoyan, Armenian choreographer, director, dancer and dance teacher.

== Bibliography ==
- Verluise, Pierre (1995). Armenia in Crisis: The 1988 Earthquake. Detroit: Wayne State University Press. ISBN 9780814325278.
