= CCCI =

CCCI may refer to:

- Campus Crusade for Christ International
- Central Criminal Court of Iraq
- Chittagong Chamber of Commerce & Industry
- Cleveland, Columbus, Cincinnati and Indianapolis Railway
- Compagnie du Congo pour le Commerce et l’Industrie
- 301 in Roman numerals
