= 1984 in Armenia =

- Decades: 1960s; 1970s; 1980s; 1990s; 2000s
- See also: Other events of 1984; List of years in Armenia

The following lists events that happened during 1984 in Armenia.

== Incumbents ==
- Chairman of the Council of Ministers of the Armenian Soviet Socialist Republic: Fadey Sargsyan

== Births ==
- 5 April – Aram Mp3, singer
