= 1987 in Armenia =

- Decades: 1960s; 1970s; 1980s; 1990s; 2000s
- See also: Other events of 1987; List of years in Armenia

The following lists events that happened during 1987 in Armenia.

== Incumbents ==
- Prime Minister: Fadey Sargsyan

== Events ==
=== October ===
- October 18 - A minor rally on Freedom Square, Yerevan for the unification of Artsakh with Armenia.
