= 2008 in Armenia =

- Decades: 1980s; 1990s; 2000s; 2010s; 2020s
- See also: Other events of 2008; List of years in Armenia

The following lists events that happened in 2008 in Armenia.

== Incumbents ==
- President: Robert Kocharyan (until 9 April), Serzh Sargsyan (starting 9 April)
- Prime Minister: Serzh Sargsyan (until 9 April), Tigran Sargsyan (starting 9 April)

== Events ==
=== January ===
- January 18 - Armenian-Americans urge the restoration of Section 907 of the Freedom Support Act in wake of Azeri war talk.
- January 18 - Armine Ohanyan, senior editor of the "Zhamanak Yerevan" daily is sacked for posting information that "was balanced but not always sympathetic" to former Armenian president-turned opposition candidate Levon Ter-Petrosyan.

=== February ===
- February 20 - Prime Minister Serzh Sargsyan is elected as President in a contest hailed as largely democratic by OSCE and international monitors.

=== March ===
- March 1 - 2008 Armenian presidential election protests
  - Armenian President Robert Kocharyan declares a state of emergency following political unrest in Yerevan.
  - Eight people have been killed in the post-election unrest between Armenian authorities and the opposition.
- March 3 - Armenian police have arrested 30 opposition activists accused of causing political unrest.
- March 4 - Georgian President Mikheil Saakashvili has expressed "his support to the people and authorities of Armenia".

=== August ===
- August 8-24 - 25 athletes from Armenia competed at the 2008 Summer Olympics in Beijing, China.
