= 989 in Armenia =

- Decades
- See also: Other events of 989; List of years in Armenia

The following lists events that happened during 989 in Armenia.

== Events ==
=== Date unknown ===
- Cathedral of Ani construction began by Trdat
- Gagik I of Armenia succeeded his brother Smbat II
- David I Anhoghin succeeded his father Kiurike I

=== October ===
- October 25 – The Hagia Sophia at Constantinople is struck by a great earthquake, causing the collapse of the western dome arch. Basil II asks the Armenian architect Trdat, the creator of the Cathedral of Ani, to direct the repairs.

== Deaths ==
- Smbat II, King of Armenia
- Kiurike I, King of Tashir-Dzoraget

== See also ==
- Outline of Armenia
- List of Armenia-related topics
- History of Armenia
