= 1996 in Armenia =

- Decades: 1970s; 1980s; 1990s; 2000s; 2010s
- See also: Other events of 1996; List of years in Armenia

The following lists events that happened during 1996 in Armenia.

== Incumbents ==
- President: Levon Ter-Petrosyan
- Prime Minister: Hrant Bagratyan (until 4 November), Armen Sarkissian (starting 4 November)
- Speaker: Babken Ararktsyan

== Events ==
=== March ===
- March 1–8: The first leg and the second leg of the 1995–96 Armenian Cup were played.

=== April ===
- April 22: The EU–Armenia Partnership and Cooperation Agreement was signed.

=== July ===
- July 19 - Armenia takes part in the Summer Olympic Games for the first time as an independent nation.

=== August ===
- August 16–25: Five athletes from Armenia competed at the 1996 Summer Paralympics.

=== September ===
- September 15: The 32nd Chess Olympiad is opened in Yerevan.
- September 21: A military parade in honour of the 5th anniversary of Armenia's independence was held on the Republic Square.
- September 22: Levon Ter-Petrosyan wins the presidential elections in Armenia.

== Establishments ==
- Armavia
- Miss Armenia

== Disestablishments ==
- FC Yeghvard
