= 1991 in Armenia =

- Decades: 1970s; 1980s; 1990s; 2000s; 2010s
- See also: Other events of 1991; List of years in Armenia

The following lists events that happened during 1991 in Armenia.

== Incumbents ==
- President: Levon Ter-Petrosyan
- Prime Minister: Vazgen Manukyan (until 22 November), Gagik Harutyunyan (from 22 November)

== Events ==
=== September ===
- September 21 - Armenia declares independence from the Soviet Union.

=== October ===
- October 17 - The first ever presidential election is held in Armenia, the result was a victory for Levon Ter-Petrosyan.
