= 1992 in Armenia =

- Decades: 1970s; 1980s; 1990s; 2000s; 2010s
- See also: Other events of 1992; List of years in Armenia

The following lists events that happened during 1992 in Armenia.

== Incumbents ==
- President: Levon Ter-Petrosyan
- Prime Minister: Gagik Harutyunyan (until 30 July), Khosrov Harutyunyan (starting 30 July)

== Events ==
=== January ===
- January 27 - In the disputed territory of Nagorno-Karabakh, fighting between Armenians and Azeris leaves at least 60 people dead.
- January 28 - The current form of the Armenian Armed Forces is established.
- January 29 - A resolution without any vote is adopted for recommendation to the General Assembly that Armenia be admitted.

=== May ===
- May 8-9 - The Armenian Armed Forces capture the city of Shushi, marking the first significant military victory by Armenians.

=== June ===
- June 25 - Armenia joins the Organization of the Black Sea Economic Cooperation.
