= 373 =

373 in various calendars
- Gregorian calendar: 373; CCCLXXIII
- Ab urbe condita: 1126
- Assyrian calendar: 5123
- Balinese saka calendar: 294–295
- Bengali calendar: −221 – −220
- Berber calendar: 1323
- Buddhist calendar: 917
- Burmese calendar: −265
- Byzantine calendar: 5881–5882
- Chinese calendar: 壬申年 (Water Monkey); 3070 or 2863 — to — 癸酉年 (Water Rooster); 3071 or 2864
- Coptic calendar: 89–90
- Discordian calendar: 1539
- Ethiopian calendar: 365–366
- Hebrew calendar: 4133–4134
- Hindu calendars
- Vikram Samvat: 429–430
- Shaka Samvat: 294–295
- Kali Yuga: 3473–3474
- Holocene calendar: 10373
- Iranian calendar: 249 BP – 248 BP
- Islamic calendar: 257 BH – 256 BH
- Javanese calendar: 255–256
- Julian calendar: 373; CCCLXXIII
- Korean calendar: 2706
- Minguo calendar: 1539 before ROC 民前1539年
- Nanakshahi calendar: −1095
- Seleucid era: 684/685 AG
- Thai solar calendar: 915–916
- Tibetan calendar: ཆུ་ཕོ་སྤྲེ་ལོ་ (male Water-Monkey); 499 or 118 or −654 — to — ཆུ་མོ་བྱ་ལོ་ (female Water-Bird); 500 or 119 or −653

Year 373 (CCCLXXIII) was a common year starting on Tuesday of the Julian calendar. At the time, it was known as the Year of the Consulship of Augustus and Valens (or, less frequently, year 1126 Ab urbe condita). The denomination 373 for this year has been used since the early medieval period, when the Anno Domini calendar era became the prevalent method in Europe for naming years.

== Events ==
=== By place ===
==== Roman Empire ====
- Emperor Valens is converted to Arianism, and orders the persecution of Trinitarian Christians in the Roman East.
- Quintus Aurelius Symmachus becomes proconsul of Africa, and is made a member of the pontifical college.
- Count Theodosius the Elder is appointed commander of an expedition to suppress the rebellion of Firmus in Mauretania.
- The Aqueduct of Valens is inaugurated near Constantinople (modern Istanbul); the aqueduct has a length of 971 meters.

==== Europe ====
- Battle of the Tanais River: The Huns defeat the Alans near the Don, sending the remnants fleeing westward.

==== Persia ====
- King Shapur II declares war as a result of Valens' support of Armenia. Emperor Valens makes Antioch his military base for the campaign against Persia.

=== By topic ===
==== Religion ====
- Saint Martin of Tours undertakes the Christianization of Gaul.

== Births ==
- Murong Hui, Chinese general and prince of the Later Yan Dynasty (d. 397)
- Murong Sheng (or Daoyun), Chinese emperor of the Later Yan Dynasty (d. 401)
- Synesius of Cyrene, Christian bishop (approximate date)

== Deaths ==
- May 2 – Athanasius of Alexandria, Egyptian bishop and saint (b. 296)
- June 9 – Ephrem the Syrian, Syrian Orthodox priest and saint (b. 306)
- Huan Wen (or Yuanzi), Chinese general and regent (b. 312)
- Nerses I (the Great), Armenian catholicos (or patriarch)
- Sun Sheng, Chinese historian and politician (b. 302)

== Gallery ==
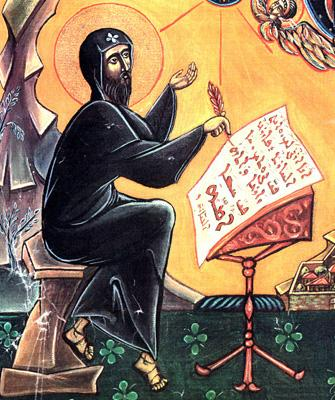
Saint Ephrem the Syrian

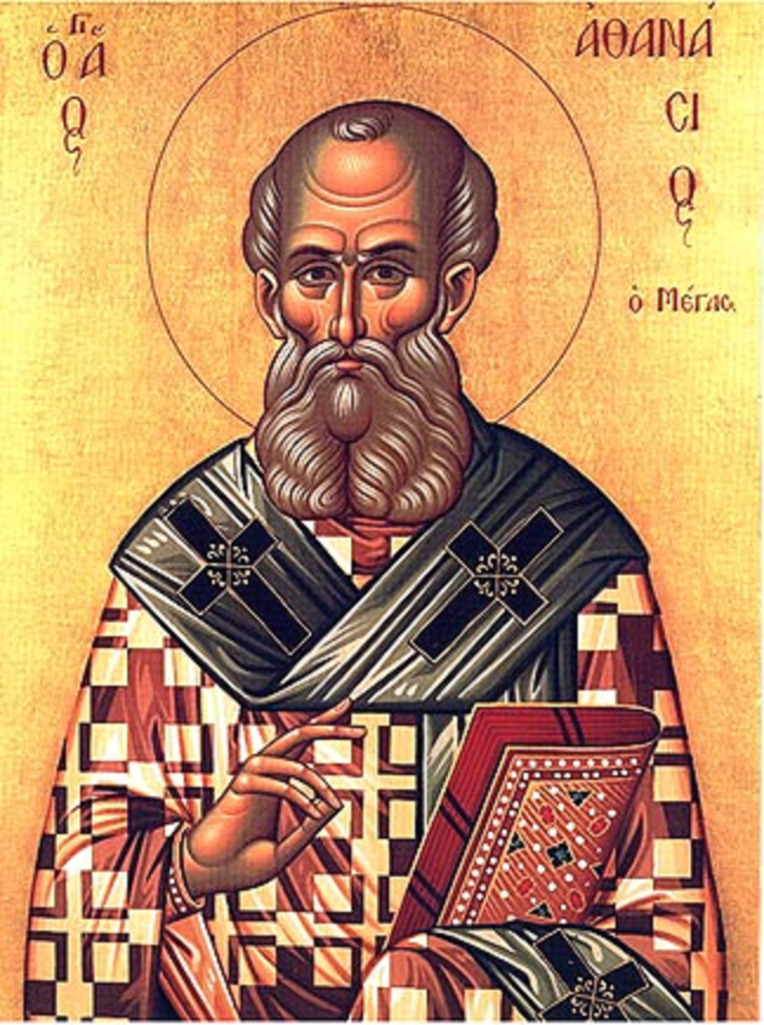
Saint Athanasius of Alexandria

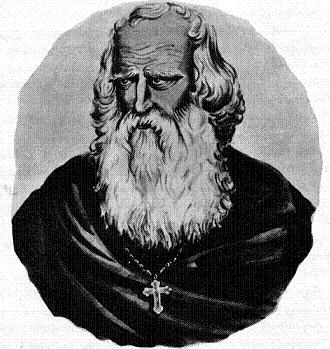
Saint Nerses I
