= 1918 in Armenia =

- Decades: 1900s; 1910s; 1920s; 1930s
- See also: Other events of 1918; List of years in Armenia

The following lists events that happened during 1918 in Armenia.

== Incumbents ==
- Prime Minister: Hovhannes Katchaznouni
- Speaker of the Parliament: Avetik Sahakyan

== Events ==
=== March ===
- ? - The Armenian–Azerbaijani War begins.

=== May ===
- May 21–29 - The Ottoman World War I defeat at the Battle of Sardarabad is seen as saving the Armenian nation from destruction.
- May 25–28 - Outnumbered Armenian defenders defeat invading Ottoman forces in the Battle of Karakilisa.
- May 28 - Armenia declares its independence as the First Republic of Armenia.

=== June ===
- June 4 - The First Republic of Armenia signed its first treaty, the Treaty of Batum. The other signatories are the Ottoman Empire, the Azerbaijan Democratic Republic, and the Democratic Republic of Georgia.

=== December ===
- December 1–31 - The Georgian–Armenian War is fought.
- December 18 - Armenpress, the oldest news agency in Armenia, is founded.

== Births ==
- September 30 - Gevorg Emin, poet, essayist and translator

== Deaths ==
- ? - Hambardzum Arakelian, journalist, writer, and activist, founder of The Relief Committee for Armenian migrants and the Armenian Popular party
