= 2001 in Armenia =

- Decades: 1980s; 1990s; 2000s; 2010s; 2020s
- See also: Other events of 2001; List of years in Armenia

The following lists events that happened during 2001 in Armenia.

== Incumbents ==
- President: Robert Kocharyan
- Prime Minister: Andranik Margaryan
- Speaker: Armen Khachatryan

== Events ==
=== September ===
- September 25 - Pope John Paul II visits Armenia to participate on the celebrations of 1,700th anniversary of the adoption of Christianity as a national religion in Armenia.
