= 2000 in Armenia =

- Decades: 1980s; 1990s; 2000s; 2010s; 2020s
- See also: Other events of 2000; List of years in Armenia

The following lists events that happened during 2000 in Armenia.

== Incumbents ==
- President: Robert Kocharyan
- Prime Minister: Aram Sargsyan (until 12 May), Andranik Margaryan (starting 12 May)
- Speaker: Armen Khachatryan

== Events ==
=== March ===
- March 22: Former NKR Defence Minister General Samvel Babayan leads an unsuccessful assassination attempt against president Arkadi Ghukasyan in Stepanakert.

=== April ===
- April 4: Former Interior Minister Vano Siradeghyan leaves Armenia while police investigates charges on him for murder.

=== September ===
- September 15-October 1: 25 athletes from Armenia competed at the 2000 Summer Olympics in Sydney, Australia.
