= 2010 in Armenia =

- Decades: 1990s; 2000s; 2010s; 2020s
- See also: Other events of 2010; List of years in Armenia

The following lists events that happened during 2010 in Armenia.

== Incumbents ==
- President: Serzh Sargsyan
- Prime Minister: Tigran Sargsyan
- Speaker: Hovik Abrahamyan

== Events ==
=== February ===
- February 12-28 - 4 athletes from Armenia competed at the 2010 Winter Olympics in Vancouver, Canada.

=== April ===
- April 6 - Prime Minister of Turkey Recep Tayyip Erdoğan, speaking about 100,000 Armenian illegal immigrants currently living in Turkey, says "I may have to tell these 100,000 to go back to their country because they are not my citizens. I don't have to keep them in my country".
- April 24 - Tens of thousands of people rally and lay flowers at a monument in Yerevan to the victims on the 95th anniversary of the Armenian genocide.

=== August ===
- August 19 - Russian President Dmitry Medvedev begins a state visit in Armenia by meeting with Armenian president Serzh Sargsyan and paying tribute to the victims of the Armenian genocide at the Tsitsernakaberd memorial. Russian military presence in the South Caucasian republic is to be extended until 2044.

=== September ===
- September 1 - A border clash between Armenia and Azerbaijan occurs, leaving several soldiers dead and both sides blaming the other for the violence.

=== November ===
- November 6 - Armenia and Azerbaijan exchange the bodies of deceased soldiers and a civilian under the auspices of the International Committee of the Red Cross.
