= 1080 in Armenia =

- Decades
- See also: Other events of 1080; List of years in Armenia

The following lists events that happened during 1080 in Armenia.

== Events ==
- Armenian Cilicia became independent from Byzantine Empire
- Roupen I became 1st Lord of Armenian Cilicia

== Births ==
- Leo I, prince of Cilician Armenia (approximate date)

== Deaths ==
- Aristakes Lastivertsi, Armenian historian

== See also ==
- Outline of Armenia
- List of Armenia-related topics
- History of Armenia
