= 2007 in Armenia =

- Decades: 1980s; 1990s; 2000s; 2010s; 2020s
- See also: Other events of 2007; List of years in Armenia

Events from the year 2007 in Armenia

== Incumbents ==
- President: Robert Kocharyan
- Prime Minister: Andranik Margaryan (until March 26), Serzh Sargsyan (starting March 26)
- Speaker: Tigran Torosyan

== Events ==
=== January ===
- January 1 – The Armenian government detains citizen Vahan Aroyan for allegedly plotting a coup d'état against Armenian President Robert Kocharyan. The Association of Armenian Volunteers, a political opposition group, denounces Aroyan's detainment, saying the move is an attempt to silence dissidence.
- January 19 – Hrant Dink, an Armenian-Turkish writer, is shot dead in Istanbul. Dink was convicted in 2005 of 'insulting Turkishness' in an article on Armenian–Turkish relations.
- January 20 – A man named Ogün Samast is arrested in Samsun by Turkish authorities for killing Armenian-Turkish writer Hrant Dink.
- January 23 – Thousands of mourners attend the funeral of Hrant Dink. Many in the crowd carried placards reading "We are all Armenian" and "We are all Hrant Dink" in Turkish, Kurdish and Armenian, and also placards stating "301 is the murderer".
- January 24 – Over 100,000 Turkish citizens, including those of Armenian descent fill the streets of Istanbul to mourn and mark the assassination of Hrant Dink, editor of the dissident newspaper Agos.
- January 25 – The city council of Shushi, Nagorno-Karabakh has selected a new coat of arms for the city as part of a "Shushi Revival." The new coat of arms was designed by Rouben Arutchyan, an artist from Yerevan by descent from a famous Shushi family. The new coat features a guardian angel of "Sourp Amenaprkich Kazanchetsost" Church.
- January 27 – The meeting place between the Armenian and Azerbaijani national football teams in the framework of European Championship 2008 selection stage will be determined by UEFA Executive Committee.
- January 28 – Turkish Minister of Foreign Affairs, Abdullah Gül that a change to Article 301 of the Turkish penal code was imminent as it was hindering the reform process in Turkey. Both Hrant Dink and Orhan Pamuk were tried on 301 for "insulting Turkishness" after making statements regarding the Armenian genocide.
- January 29 – Armenian grand master Levon Aronian won Corus-2007, the international chess tournament held in the Netherlands.
- January 31 – Ross Wilson, the Ambassador of the United States to Turkey, says the Bush administration opposes a bill in the United States Congress that will recognize the Armenian genocide, which the United States Government does not recognize.

=== February ===
- February 1 – The private Turkish television channel TGRT broadcast video footage of the man accused of shooting Hrant Dink posing proudly behind a Turkish flag, flanked by police officers of both military and security police, allegedly filmed in the police bureau of Samsun. The video caused shock and consternation as commentators warned it was another sign of the growing power of Turkish ultra-nationalism.
- February 2 – Armenians, Kurds and Turks call on the British Parliament to recognize the Armenian genocide.
- February 5 – An Azerbaijani soldier taken prisoner by Armenian forces has been charged with treason in Azerbaijan after returning there.
- February 5 – The United States donates a mobile field hospital to the Armenian Army.
- February 5 – According to Armenian Energy Minister Armen Movsisian, the first Armenian section of a key gas pipeline running from neighboring Iran will be officially inaugurated next month or in April at the latest.

=== March ===
- March 9 – Doğu Perinçek is found guilty of genocide denial by a Swiss district court, making him the first person convicted for denial of the Armenian genocide by a court of law.
- March 25 – The Armenian Prime Minister Andranik Margaryan dies of a heart attack.

=== April ===
- April 16 – The offices of the Prosperous Armenia political party in Yerevan are bombed. No one is killed and no one has claimed responsibility.
- April 20 – The Basque Parliament approved an institutional declaration recognising the Armenian genocide. The Basque Parliament included six articles where it affirms the authenticity of the Armenian genocide and declares sympathy to the Armenians, while at the same time denouncing Turkey's negation of the genocide and its economic blockade imposed on Armenia.

=== May ===
- May 12 – Voters in Armenia go to the polls to elect a new National Assembly of Armenia.

=== June ===
- June 5 – The Chilean Senate unanimously adopted a legislation recognising the Armenian genocide and urging its government to support a key 1985 United Nations Subcommission report properly describing this crime against humanity as a clear instance of genocide.

=== July ===
- July 2 – The trial over the murder of Turkish-Armenian journalist Hrant Dink opens in Istanbul, Turkey.

=== August ===
- August 10 – UEFA cancelled both matches between Armenia and Azerbaijan in Group A of the Euro 2008 qualifiers due to a lack of agreement between the football federations of the two countries.

=== September ===
- September 7 – Armenian Energy Minister Armen Movsisyan announced that Metsamor unit-2 was to be replaced with a new nuclear power plant built on the same site at a cost of $2 billion. "The project's feasibility study is being carried out by Armenia, Russia, the US and the International Atomic Energy Agency. The old nuclear power plant is to be rebuilt within four-and-a-half years", he stated, clarifying that "many foreign countries now understand that Armenia must have a nuclear power plant." TAEK, which had recently denied claims in Today's Zaman that its latest protest to the IAEA was made in response to the RESAI early warning system indicating "an increase in radioactive leakage in the region," stating, "None of the radioactivity analyses or RESAI station measurements done up until now have uncovered radioactivity or radiation levels above normal," confirmed that it would be involved in following related developments and taking the necessary precautions from the Turkish side.

=== October ===
- October 10 – The United States House Committee on Foreign Affairs approved HR 106, a bill that categorized and condemned the Ottoman Empire for the Armenian genocide.
- October 11 – Turkey recalls its ambassador to the United States due to anger over an upcoming House of Representatives vote on recognizing the Armenian genocide.
- October 25 – Supporters of a U.S. congressional resolution condemning the Armenian genocide drop calls for a vote.

=== November ===
- November 23 – The Mercosur parliament adopted a resolution recognising the "Armenian Genocide, perpetrated by the Ottoman Empire, which took 1.5 million lives from 1915 to 1923". The Mercosur resolution also expressed its support for the Armenian Cause and called on all countries to recognize the genocide.

== Deaths ==
- January 19: Hrant Dink, 52, editor, journalist and columnist, shot.
- March 25: Andranik Margaryan, 55, Prime Minister since 2000, heart attack.
- May 16: Gohar Gasparyan, 83, soprano opera singer.
- August 14: Jirair S. Hovnanian, 80, home builder.
