= 1727 in Armenia =

- Decades
- See also: Other events of 1727; List of years in Armenia

Events from the year 1727 in Armenia.

== Events ==
=== February ===
- February 26 – The beginning of siege of Halidzor Fortress.

=== March ===
- March 4 – The Battle of Halidzor begins. A small group of defenders in lead of David Bek, Mkhitar Sparapet and Ter Avetis, overcomes a much larger Ottoman Empire army.
- March 7 – Ending of Battle of Halidzor and victory for the Armenian soldiers of Syunik.
