= List of years in Armenia =

This is a list of years in Armenia. See also the timeline of Armenian history. For only articles about years in Armenia that have been written, see Category:Years in Armenia.

== 21st century ==
2020s
2020
2021
2022
2023
2024
2025
2026

2010s
2010
2011
2012
2013
2014
2015
2016
2017
2018
2019

2000s
2000
2001
2002
2003
2004
2005
2006
2007
2008
2009

== 20th century ==
1990s
1990
1991
1992
1993
1994
1995
1996
1997
1998
1999

1980s
1980
1981
1982
1983
1984
1985
1986
1987
1988
1989

1970s
1970
1971
1972
1973
1974
1975
1976
1977
1978
1979

1960s
1960
1961
1962
1963
1964
1965
1966
1967
1968
1969

1950s
1950
1951
1952
1953
1954
1955
1956
1957
1958
1959

1940s
1940
1941
1942
1943
1944
1945
1946
1947
1948
1949

1930s
1930
1931
1932
1933
1934
1935
1936
1937
1938
1939

1920s
1920
1921
1922
1923
1924
1925
1926
1927
1928
1929

1910s
1910
1911
1912
1913
1914
1915
1916
1917
1918
1919

1900s
1900
1901
1902
1903
1904
1905
1906
1907
1908
1909

== 19th century ==
1890s
1890
1891
1892
1893
1894
1895
1896
1897
1898
1899

1880s
1880
1881
1882
1883
1884
1885
1886
1887
1888
1889

1870s
1870
1871
1872
1873
1874
1875
1876
1877
1878
1879

1860s
1860
1861
1862
1863
1864
1865
1866
1867
1868
1869

1850s
1850
1851
1852
1853
1854
1855
1856
1857
1858
1859

1840s
1840
1841
1842
1843
1844
1845
1846
1847
1848
1849

1830s
1830
1831
1832
1833
1834
1835
1836
1837
1838
1839

1820s
1820
1821
1822
1823
1824
1825
1826
1827
1828
1829

1810s
1810
1811
1812
1813
1814
1815
1816
1817
1818
1819

1800s
1800
1801
1802
1803
1804
1805
1806
1807
1808
1809

== 18th century ==
1790s
1790
1791
1792
1793
1794
1795
1796
1797
1798
1799

1780s
1780
1781
1782
1783
1784
1785
1786
1787
1788
1789

1770s
1770
1771
1772
1773
1774
1775
1776
1777
1778
1779

1760s
1760
1761
1762
1763
1764
1765
1766
1767
1768
1769

1750s
1750
1751
1752
1753
1754
1755
1756
1757
1758
1759

1740s
1740
1741
1742
1743
1744
1745
1746
1747
1748
1749

1730s
1730
1731
1732
1733
1734
1735
1736
1737
1738
1739

1720s
1720
1721
1722
1723
1724
1725
1726
1727
1728
1729

1710s
1710
1711
1712
1713
1714
1715
1716
1717
1718
1719

1700s
1700
1701
1702
1703
1704
1705
1706
1707
1708
1709

== 17th century ==
1690s
1690
1691
1692
1693
1694
1695
1696
1697
1698
1699

1680s
1680
1681
1682
1683
1684
1685
1686
1687
1688
1689

1670s
1670
1671
1672
1673
1674
1675
1676
1677
1678
1679

1660s
1660
1661
1662
1663
1664
1665
1666
1667
1668
1669

1650s
1650
1651
1652
1653
1654
1655
1656
1657
1658
1659

1640s
1640
1641
1642
1643
1644
1645
1646
1647
1648
1649

1630s
1630
1631
1632
1633
1634
1635
1636
1637
1638
1639

1620s
1620
1621
1622
1623
1624
1625
1626
1627
1628
1629

1610s
1610
1611
1612
1613
1614
1615
1616
1617
1618
1619

1600s
1600
1601
1602
1603
1604
1605
1606
1607
1608
1609

== 16th century ==
1590s
1590
1591
1592
1593
1594
1595
1596
1597
1598
1599

1580s
1580
1581
1582
1583
1584
1585
1586
1587
1588
1589

1570s
1570
1571
1572
1573
1574
1575
1576
1577
1578
1579

1560s
1560
1561
1562
1563
1564
1565
1566
1567
1568
1569

1550s
1550
1551
1552
1553
1554
1555
1556
1557
1558
1559

1540s
1540
1541
1542
1543
1544
1545
1546
1547
1548
1549

1530s
1530
1531
1532
1533
1534
1535
1536
1537
1538
1539

1520s
1520
1521
1522
1523
1524
1525
1526
1527
1528
1529

1510s
1510
1511
1512
1513
1514
1515
1516
1517
1518
1519

1500s
1500
1501
1502
1503
1504
1505
1506
1507
1508
1509

== 15th century ==
1490s
1490
1491
1492
1493
1494
1495
1496
1497
1498
1499

1480s
1480
1481
1482
1483
1484
1485
1486
1487
1488
1489

1470s
1470
1471
1472
1473
1474
1475
1476
1477
1478
1479

1460s
1460
1461
1462
1463
1464
1465
1466
1467
1468
1469

1450s
1450
1451
1452
1453
1454
1455
1456
1457
1458
1459

1440s
1440
1441
1442
1443
1444
1445
1446
1447
1448
1449

1430s
1430
1431
1432
1433
1434
1435
1436
1437
1438
1439

1420s
1420
1421
1422
1423
1424
1425
1426
1427
1428
1429

1410s
1410
1411
1412
1413
1414
1415
1416
1417
1418
1419

1400s
1400
1401
1402
1403
1404
1405
1406
1407
1408
1409

== 14th century ==
1390s
1390
1391
1392
1393
1394
1395
1396
1397
1398
1399

1380s
1380
1381
1382
1383
1384
1385
1386
1387
1388
1389

1370s
1370
1371
1372
1373
1374
1375
1376
1377
1378
1379

1360s
1360
1361
1362
1363
1364
1365
1366
1367
1368
1369

1350s
1350
1351
1352
1353
1354
1355
1356
1357
1358
1359

1340s
1340
1341
1342
1343
1344
1345
1346
1347
1348
1349

1330s
1330
1331
1332
1333
1334
1335
1336
1337
1338
1339

1320s
1320
1321
1322
1323
1324
1325
1326
1327
1328
1329

1310s
1310
1311
1312
1313
1314
1315
1316
1317
1318
1319

1300s
1300
1301
1302
1303
1304
1305
1306
1307
1308
1309

== 13th century ==
1290s
1290
1291
1292
1293
1294
1295
1296
1297
1298
1299

1280s
1280
1281
1282
1283
1284
1285
1286
1287
1288
1289

1270s
1270
1271
1272
1273
1274
1275
1276
1277
1278
1279

1260s
1260
1261
1262
1263
1264
1265
1266
1267
1268
1269

1250s
1250
1251
1252
1253
1254
1255
1256
1257
1258
1259

1240s
1240
1241
1242
1243
1244
1245
1246
1247
1248
1249

1230s
1230
1231
1232
1233
1234
1235
1236
1237
1238
1239

1220s
1220
1221
1222
1223
1224
1225
1226
1227
1228
1229

1210s
1210
1211
1212
1213
1214
1215
1216
1217
1218
1219

1200s
1200
1201
1202
1203
1204
1205
1206
1207
1208
1209

== 12th century ==
1190s
1190
1191
1192
1193
1194
1195
1196
1197
1198
1199

1180s
1180
1181
1182
1183
1184
1185
1186
1187
1188
1189

1170s
1170
1171
1172
1173
1174
1175
1176
1177
1178
1179

1160s
1160
1161
1162
1163
1164
1165
1166
1167
1168
1169

1150s
1150
1151
1152
1153
1154
1155
1156
1157
1158
1159

1140s
1140
1141
1142
1143
1144
1145
1146
1147
1148
1149

1130s
1130
1131
1132
1133
1134
1135
1136
1137
1138
1139

1120s
1120
1121
1122
1123
1124
1125
1126
1127
1128
1129

1110s
1110
1111
1112
1113
1114
1115
1116
1117
1118
1119

1100s
1100
1101
1102
1103
1104
1105
1106
1107
1108
1109

== 11th century ==
1090s
1090
1091
1092
1093
1094
1095
1096
1097
1098
1099

1080s
1080
1081
1082
1083
1084
1085
1086
1087
1088
1089

1070s
1070
1071
1072
1073
1074
1075
1076
1077
1078
1079

1060s
1060
1061
1062
1063
1064
1065
1066
1067
1068
1069

1050s
1050
1051
1052
1053
1054
1055
1056
1057
1058
1059

1040s
1040
1041
1042
1043
1044
1045
1046
1047
1048
1049

1030s
1030
1031
1032
1033
1034
1035
1036
1037
1038
1039

1020s
1020
1021
1022
1023
1024
1025
1026
1027
1028
1029

1010s
1010
1011
1012
1013
1014
1015
1016
1017
1018
1019

1000s
1000
1001
1002
1003
1004
1005
1006
1007
1008
1009

== 10th century ==
990s
990
991
992
993
994
995
996
997
998
999

980s
980
981
982
983
984
985
986
987
988
989

970s
970
971
972
973
974
975
976
977
978
979

960s
960
961
962
963
964
965
966
967
968
969

950s
950
951
952
953
954
955
956
957
958
959

940s
940
941
942
943
944
945
946
947
948
949

930s
930
931
932
933
934
935
936
937
938
939

920s
920
921
922
923
924
925
926
927
928
929

910s
910
911
912
913
914
915
916
917
918
919

900s
900
901
902
903
904
905
906
907
908
909

== 9th century ==
890s
890
891
892
893
894
895
896
897
898
899

880s
880
881
882
883
884
885
886
887
888
889

870s
870
871
872
873
874
875
876
877
878
879

860s
860
861
862
863
864
865
866
867
868
869

850s
850
851
852
853
854
855
856
857
858
859

840s
840
841
842
843
844
845
846
847
848
849

830s
830
831
832
833
834
835
836
837
838
839

820s
820
821
822
823
824
825
826
827
828
829

810s
810
811
812
813
814
815
816
817
818
819

800s
800
801
802
803
804
805
806
807
808
809

== 8th century ==
790s
790
791
792
793
794
795
796
797
798
799

780s
780
781
782
783
784
785
786
787
788
789

770s
770
771
772
773
774
775
776
777
778
779

760s
760
761
762
763
764
765
766
767
768
769

750s
750
751
752
753
754
755
756
757
758
759

740s
740
741
742
743
744
745
746
747
748
749

730s
730
731
732
733
734
735
736
737
738
739

720s
720
721
722
723
724
725
726
727
728
729

710s
710
711
712
713
714
715
716
717
718
719

700s
700
701
702
703
704
705
706
707
708
709

== 7th century ==
690s
690
691
692
693
694
695
696
697
698
699

680s
680
681
682
683
684
685
686
687
688
689

670s
670
671
672
673
674
675
676
677
678
679

660s
660
661
662
663
664
665
666
667
668
669

650s
650
651
652
653
654
655
656
657
658
659

640s
640
641
642
643
644
645
646
647
648
649

630s
630
631
632
633
634
635
636
637
638
639

620s
620
621
622
623
624
625
626
627
628
629

610s
610
611
612
613
614
615
616
617
618
619

600s
600
601
602
603
604
605
606
607
608
609

== 6th century ==
590s
590
591
592
593
594
595
596
597
598
599

580s
580
581
582
583
584
585
586
587
588
589

570s
570
571
572
573
574
575
576
577
578
579

560s
560
561
562
563
564
565
566
567
568
569

550s
550
551
552
553
554
555
556
557
558
559

540s
540
541
542
543
544
545
546
547
548
549

530s
530
531
532
533
534
535
536
537
538
539

520s
520
521
522
523
524
525
526
527
528
529

510s
510
511
512
513
514
515
516
517
518
519

500s
500
501
502
503
504
505
506
507
508
509

== 5th century ==
490s
490
491
492
493
494
495
496
497
498
499

480s
480
481
482
483
484
485
486
487
488
489

470s
470
471
472
473
474
475
476
477
478
479

460s
460
461
462
463
464
465
466
467
468
469

450s
450
451
452
453
454
455
456
457
458
459

440s
440
441
442
443
444
445
446
447
448
449

430s
430
431
432
433
434
435
436
437
438
439

420s
420
421
422
423
424
425
426
427
428
429

410s
410
411
412
413
414
415
416
417
418
419

400s
400
401
402
403
404
405
406
407
408
409

== 4th century ==
390s
390
391
392
393
394
395
396
397
398
399

380s
380
381
382
383
384
385
386
387
388
389

370s
370
371
372
373
374
375
376
377
378
379

360s
360
361
362
363
364
365
366
367
368
369

350s
350
351
352
353
354
355
356
357
358
359

340s
340
341
342
343
344
345
346
347
348
349

330s
330
331
332
333
334
335
336
337
338
339

320s
320
321
322
323
324
325
326
327
328
329

310s
310
311
312
313
314
315
316
317
318
319

300s
300
301
302
303
304
305
306
307
308
309

== See also ==
- List of years by country
