= 2006 in Armenia =

- Decades: 1980s; 1990s; 2000s; 2010s; 2020s
- See also: Other events of 2006; List of years in Armenia

The following lists events that happened in 2006 in Armenia.

== Incumbents ==
- President: Robert Kocharyan
- Prime Minister: Andranik Margaryan
- Speaker: Artur Baghdasaryan (until June 1), Tigran Torosyan (from June 1)

== Events ==
=== February ===
- February 10–26 – 5 athletes from Armenia competed at the 2006 Winter Olympics in Turin, Italy.

=== May ===
- May 3 – An Armavia plane crashed into the sea while attempting to conduct a go-around following its first approach to Sochi airport, Russia, killing all 113 people on board.
- May 10 – The Bulgarian Government rejected a bill on recognition of the Armenian genocide. This came after Emel Etem Toshkova, the Deputy Prime Minister of Bulgaria and one of the leaders of the MRF, the main Turkish party in Bulgaria, declared that her party would walk out of the coalition government if the bill was passed. The bill itself was brought forward by the nationalist Ataka party.
- May 18–20 – Armenia debuts in the Eurovision Song Contest, represented by André, and finishes eight in the final contest.

=== July ===
- July 17 – The Brazilian state of Ceará became the second state after São Paulo to ratify a bill recognising the Armenian genocide.
- July 26 – Investigators examining what caused an Armenian airliner to crash with the loss of all 113 people on board have blamed pilot error.
- July 31 – The humanitarian assistance rendered by the Armenian government has been delivered to Lebanon via Syria. The 7.5-ton humanitarian cargo includes 52 types of medical products and first-aid means.

=== August ===
- August 1 – As some countries distance themselves from Iran due to the nuclear standoff, Armenia moves in to form a closer partnership.
- August 16 – Britain's Ian Porterfield was named Armenia's new soccer coach. The 60-year-old Scotsman replaced Dutchman Henk Wisman, who was fired four months ago following a string of poor results.
- August 28 – Armenian tennis champion Andre Agassi played at the U.S. Open. It was the last opportunity for tennis fans to see Agassi in the Association of Tennis Professionals play live. He faced Romania's Andrei Pavel in the first round.

=== September ===
- September 3 – Armenian tennis champion Andre Agassi retires from professional tennis after 21 years, having won eight Grand Slam titles and an Olympic gold medal.
- September 4 – Members of the European Parliament voted for the inclusion of a clause prompting Turkey "to recognize the Armenian genocide as a condition for its EU accession" in a highly critical report, which was adopted by a broad majority in the foreign relations committee of the European Parliament.
- September 26 – The two largest political parties in the Netherlands, Christian Democratic Appeal (CDA) and the Labour Party (PvdA), removed three Turkish-Dutch candidates for the 2006 general election, because they either denied or refused to publicly declare that the Armenian genocide had happened.
- September 30 – On a trip to Yerevan, French President Jacques Chirac underscored France's recognition of the Armenian genocide when commenting of the French Socialist Party's initiative to adopt a law criminalizing Armenian genocide denial. Chirac said that demonstration of racism and xenophobia in France is punishable in compliance with the Penal Code. "The rest, in my opinion," he said, "is politics having nothing in common with the legal side of the issue."

=== October ===
- October 6 – The foreign ministers of Armenia and Azerbaijan meet in Moscow for fresh negotiations over the Nagorno-Karabakh conflict. Both described the negotiations as useful and agreed to hold more talks.
- October 12 – The French Parliament has adopted a bill making it a crime to deny the Armenian genocide at the hands of the Young Turks in the last years of the Ottoman Empire, infuriating Turkey.

=== November ===
- November 29 – The lower house of Argentina's parliament adopted a resolution recognizing the Armenian genocide. The bill was overwhelmingly adopted by the assembly and declared April 24, the international day of remembrance for the Armenian genocide as an official "day of mutual tolerance and respect" among peoples around the world.
