= 451 in Armenia =

- Decades
- See also: Other events of 451; List of years in Armenia

The following lists events that happened during 451 in Armenia.

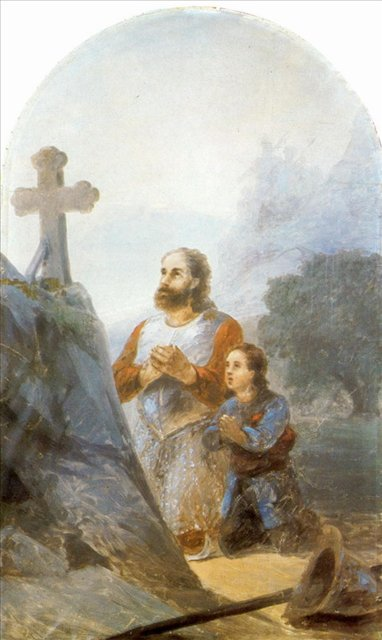
Oath of Vardan Mamikonian and his son before the Battle of Avarayr, by Ivan Ayvazovsky (1892).

== Events ==
=== May ===
- May 26 — Yazdegerd II defeats the Armenian soldiers under their rebel leader Vardan Mamikonian in Battle of Avarayr. The Sasanids defeat the Armenians militarily but guarantee them freedom to openly practice Christianity.

== Deaths ==
- Vardan Mamikonian, Sparapet and military leader

== See also ==
- Outline of Armenia
- List of Armenia-related topics
- History of Armenia
