= Lilit Pipoyan =

Armenian musician, singer, and architect (born 1955)

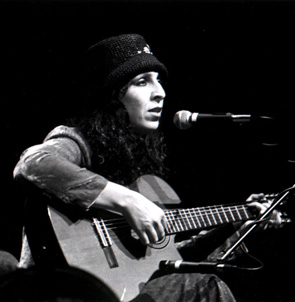
- Lilit Pipoyan performing in Los Angeles

Background information
- Born: June 16, 1955 (age 70)
- Origin: Yerevan, Armenian SSR, Soviet Union
- Genres: Contemporary folk
- Years active: 1988–present
- Website: www.lilitpipoyan.com

Lilit Pipoyan (Armenian: Լիլիթ Պիպոյան; born June 16, 1955) is an Armenian singer, songwriter, composer, and architect.

Pipoyan belongs to a circle of modern Armenian musicians whose works present an alternative to the traditional folk, classical, spiritual and pop music.

== Biography ==
Lilit Pipoyan was born in Yerevan to a family of artists. Her father was an Armenian painter, Honored Artist of the Armenian SSR. In her teenage years she graduated from the Spendiaryan specialized music school and later studied architecture, receiving her PhD in Theory and History of Armenian Architecture.

Pipoyan's compositions are based on Armenian poetry and folklore. She is fond of medieval secular songs, for which she creates modern arrangements or new melodies when the originals are lost, with distinctly Armenian character. For the first few albums, her instrumental arrangements of the songs have mainly been with solo guitar or piano, but as time progressed, she incorporated a diverse array of wired instruments into her compositions.

Since 1980, Pipoyan has been performing on the most stages of Armenia, as well as on such stages as Dolby Theatre in Los Angeles, United States, Herba Buena Center for the arts and Palace of the Legion of Honor’s Florence Gold Theater in San Francisco, United States, as well as in Lebanon, Syria, Iran, Switzerland, England, Italy. She sings and lives in Yerevan with her husband and two children.

== Awards ==
- The Best Contemporary Alternative Album in Armenian Music Awards (1999) for Rouben & Lilit; Los Angeles, USA
- Best Contemporary Folk Album, Armenian Music Awards (2003) for One Day of the City; Los Angeles, USA
- Best Singer-Songwriter in National Music Awards, the Special prize of Armenian Public Radio (2004); Yerevan, Armenia

== Discography ==
- Lialousin (1999)
- Rouben & Lilit (feat. Ruben Hakhverdyan) (1999)
- One Day of the City (2003)
- Blue Flower (2006)
- Nav (2012)
- Selected Songs of Komitas, Karaoke (2013)
- Borderless «Անպարագիծ» (2023)
