= 306 =

306 in various calendars
Gregorian calendar	306; CCCVI
Ab urbe condita	1059
Assyrian calendar	5056
Balinese saka calendar	227–228
Bengali calendar	−288 – −287
Berber calendar	1256
Buddhist calendar	850
Burmese calendar	−332
Byzantine calendar	5814–5815
Chinese calendar	乙丑年 (Wood Ox); 3003 or 2796 — to — 丙寅年 (Fire Tiger); 3004 or 2797
Coptic calendar	22–23
Discordian calendar	1472
Ethiopian calendar	298–299
Hebrew calendar	4066–4067
- Hindu calendars
Vikram Samvat	362–363
Shaka Samvat	227–228
Kali Yuga	3406–3407
Holocene calendar	10306
Iranian calendar	316 BP – 315 BP
Islamic calendar	326 BH – 325 BH
Javanese calendar	186–187
Julian calendar	306; CCCVI
Korean calendar	2639
Minguo calendar	1606 before ROC 民前1606年
Nanakshahi calendar	−1162
Seleucid era	617/618 AG
Thai solar calendar	848–849
Tibetan calendar	ཤིང་མོ་གླང་ལོ་ (female Wood-Ox); 432 or 51 or −721 — to — མེ་ཕོ་སྟག་ལོ་ (male Fire-Tiger); 433 or 52 or −720

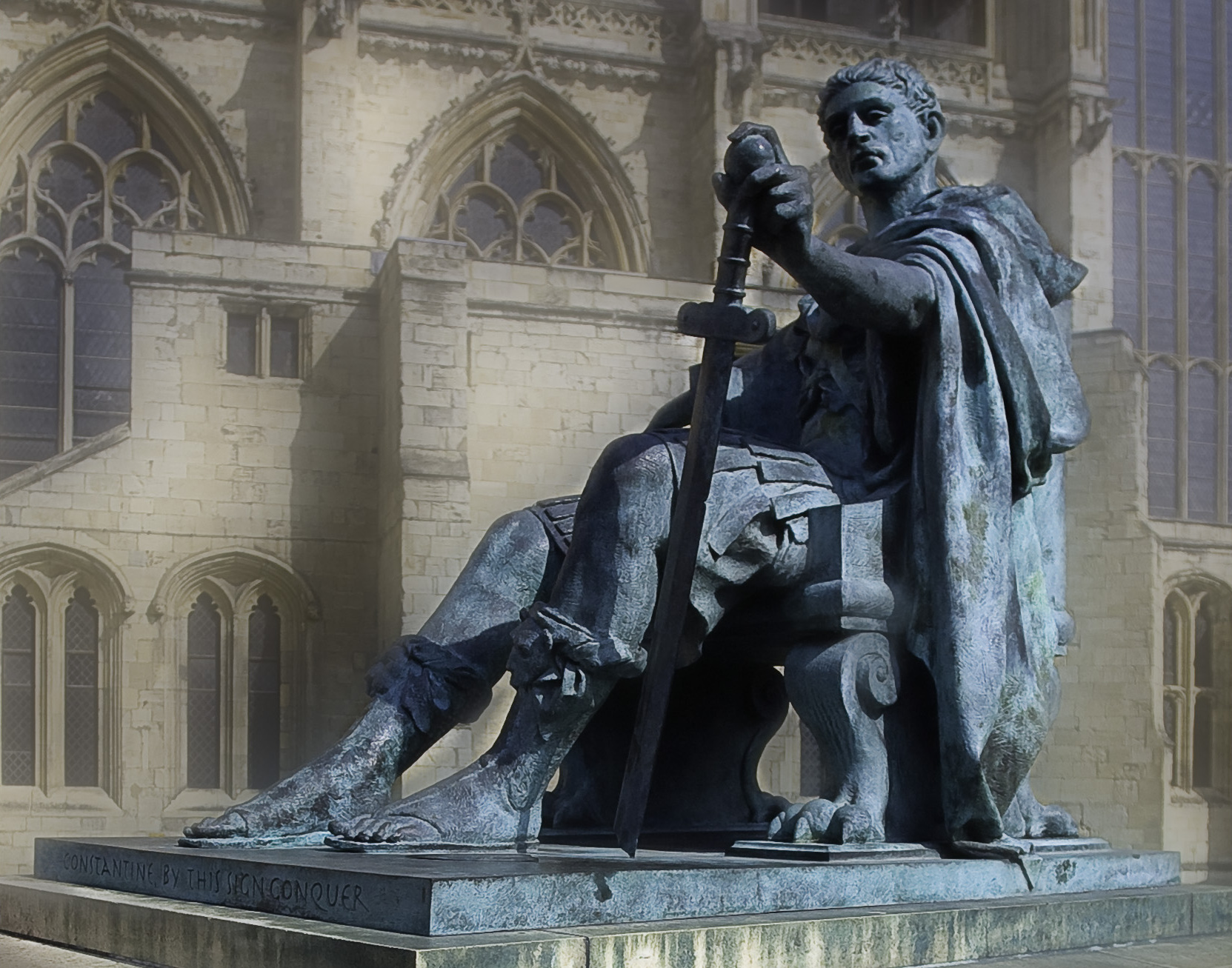
Constantine the Great (York)

Year 306 (CCCVI) was a common year starting on Tuesday of the Julian calendar. At the time, it was known as the Year of the Consulship of Constantius and Valerius (or, less frequently, year 1059 Ab urbe condita). The denomination 306 for this year has been used since the early medieval period, when the Anno Domini calendar era became the prevalent method in Europe for naming years.

== Events ==
=== By place ===
==== Roman Empire ====
- July 25 – Constantius I dies outside Eboracum (modern-day York). Constantine, aged 23 or 24, is declared emperor by his troops. Emperor Galerius grants Constantine the title of Caesar, and elevates Flavius Valerius Severus to emperor in the Western part of the Roman Empire.
- Constantine institutes toleration of the Christians in his territories.
- Constantine establishes his capital in Augusta Treverorum (Trier). He begins a major expansion of the city, strengthening the walls, expanding the palace complex and building the Imperial Baths.
- Building on the efforts of Diocletian, Galerius introduces the poll tax to central and southern Italy and truncates the size of the Praetorian Guard, with plans to disband the Guard altogether.
- October 28 – Maxentius, son of former Western Emperor Maximian, leads a revolt by the Praetorian Guard and members of the Senate in Rome, and is proclaimed Emperor. Southern Italy supports Maxentius, as do Africa, Corsica, Sardinia and Sicily. Maxentius recalls Maximian from retirement, who joins his son in Rome.
- Winter: Constantine fights with success against the Franks.
- Galerius has the Rotunda of Galerius built in Thessaloniki (Macedonia).

==== Asia ====
- The War of the Eight Princes ends in China.

=== By topic ===
==== Religion ====
- The Synod of Elvira concludes with the issue of various canons, including one declaring that killing through a magic spell is a sin and the work of the devil.
- Metrophanes becomes bishop of Byzantium.
- The Patriarchate of Lisbon is established.
- Christianity is established in Roman Britain. British bishops participate in the councils of Arles (314), Nicaea (325) and Arminum (349).

== Births ==
- Ephrem the Syrian, Syriac theologian and hymnodist (d. 373)

== Deaths ==
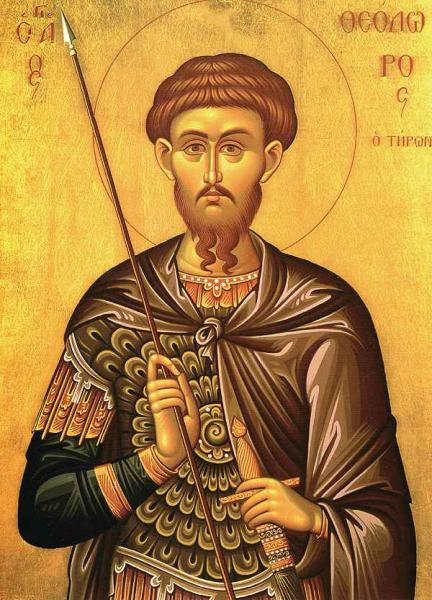
Saint Theodore of Amasea

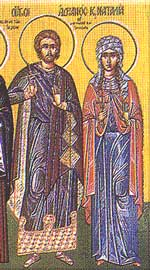
Saints Adrian and Natalia of Nicomedia

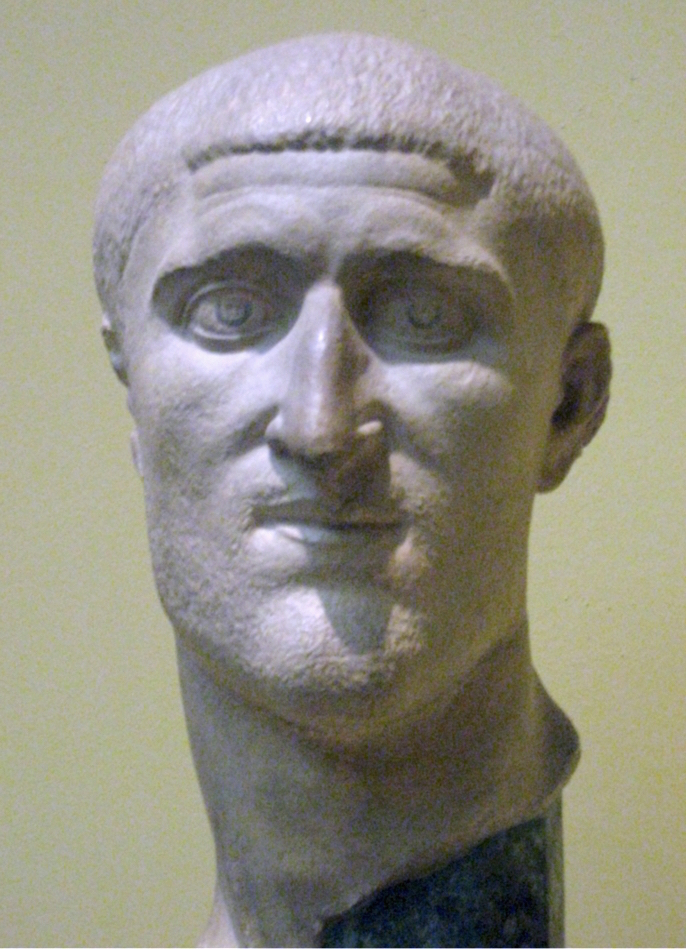
Constantius Chlorus

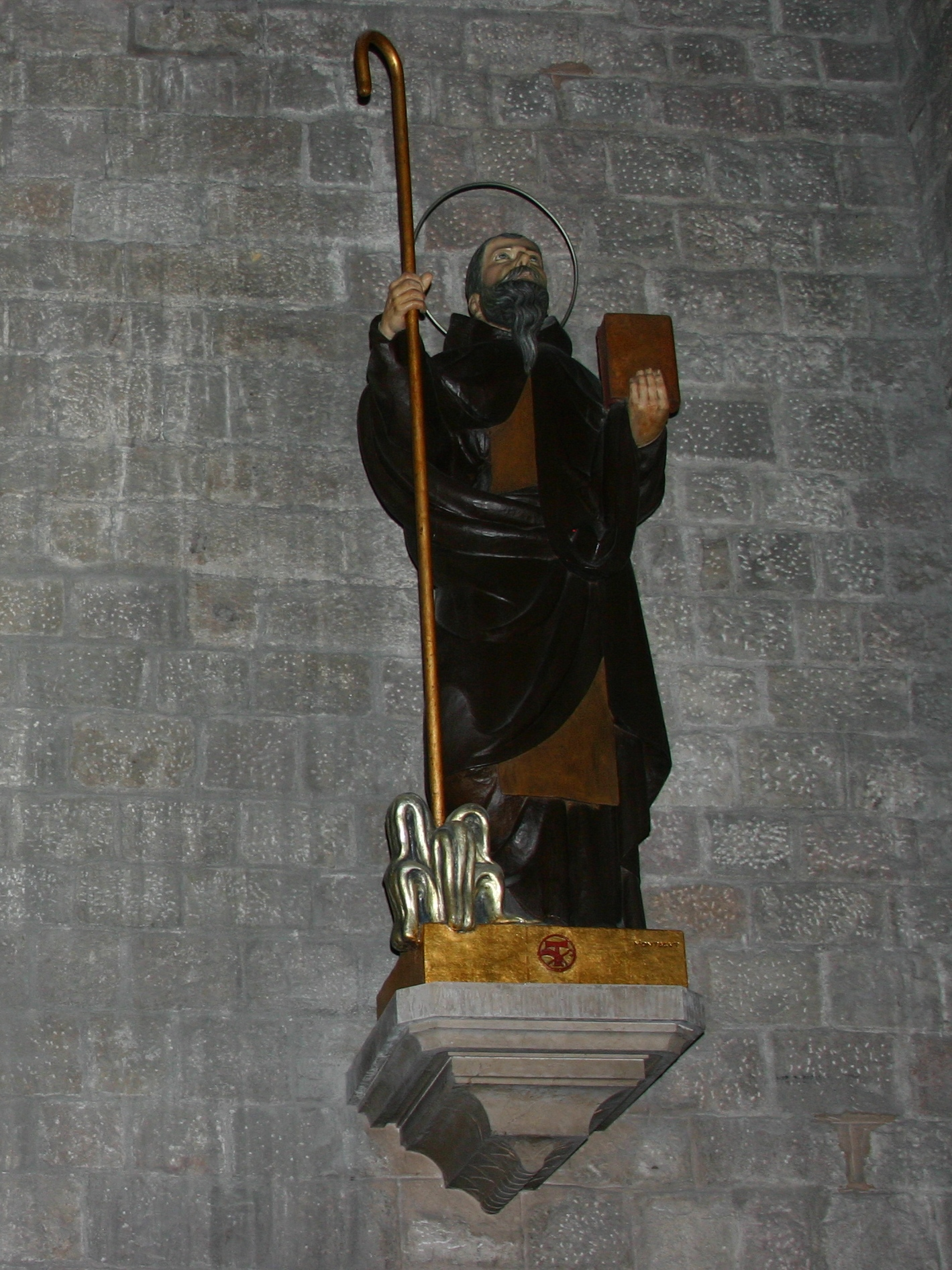
Saint Maginus

- February 17 – Theodore of Amasea, Roman soldier and martyr
- March 4 – Adrian and Natalia of Nicomedia, Christian martyrs
- July 25 – Constantius Chlorus, Roman emperor (b. c. 250)
- August 25 – Maginus, Christian hermit and martyr
- Demetrius of Thessaloniki, Roman soldier and martyr
- Sima Ying, Chinese prince of the Jin Dynasty (b. 279)
- Sima Yong (or Wenzai), Chinese prince and regent
