= 302 =

302 in various calendars
- Gregorian calendar: 302; CCCII
- Ab urbe condita: 1055
- Assyrian calendar: 5052
- Balinese saka calendar: 223–224
- Bengali calendar: −292 – −291
- Berber calendar: 1252
- Buddhist calendar: 846
- Burmese calendar: −336
- Byzantine calendar: 5810–5811
- Chinese calendar: 辛酉年 (Metal Rooster); 2999 or 2792 — to — 壬戌年 (Water Dog); 3000 or 2793
- Coptic calendar: 18–19
- Discordian calendar: 1468
- Ethiopian calendar: 294–295
- Hebrew calendar: 4062–4063
- Hindu calendars
- Vikram Samvat: 358–359
- Shaka Samvat: 223–224
- Kali Yuga: 3402–3403
- Holocene calendar: 10302
- Iranian calendar: 320 BP – 319 BP
- Islamic calendar: 330 BH – 329 BH
- Javanese calendar: 182–183
- Julian calendar: 302; CCCII
- Korean calendar: 2635
- Minguo calendar: 1610 before ROC 民前1610年
- Nanakshahi calendar: −1166
- Seleucid era: 613/614 AG
- Thai solar calendar: 844–845
- Tibetan calendar: ལྕགས་མོ་བྱ་ལོ་ (female Iron-Bird); 428 or 47 or −725 — to — ཆུ་ཕོ་ཁྱི་ལོ་ (male Water-Dog); 429 or 48 or −724

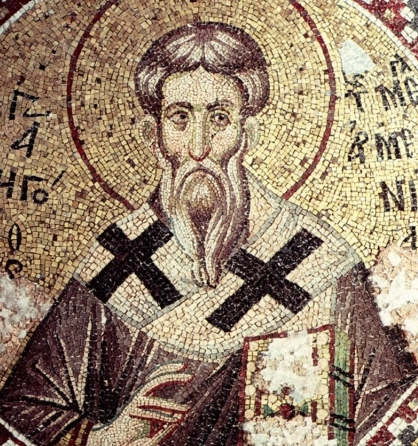
Gregory the Illuminator

Year 302 (CCCII) was a common year starting on Thursday of the Julian calendar. At the time, it was known as the Year of the Consulship of Constantius and Valerius or, less frequently, year 1055 Ab urbe condita. The denomination 302 for this year has been used since the early medieval period, when the Anno Domini calendar era became the prevalent method in Europe for naming years.

== Events ==
=== By place ===
==== Roman Empire ====
- Emperor Diocletian persecutes the Manichaeans, accusing them of being a Persian fifth column.
- Caesar Galerius wins his second victory over the Carpi.
- An invasion of Gaul by the Alemannic Lingones almost traps Caesar Constantius I between the enemy and the walls of a town. Constantius himself is carried onto the wall via a crane. However, within the same day, Constantius sallies forth from the walls and defeats the enemy in a major battle.

==== Persia ====
- Narseh, ruler (Shahanshah) of the Sassanid Empire, dies after a 9-year reign. He is succeeded by his son Hormizd II.

=== By topic ===
==== Art and Science ====
- Iamblichus of Chalcis writes a treatise on magic and the occult.

==== Religion ====
- Gregory the Illuminator is consecrated as Patriarch of Armenia by Leontius of Caesarea.

== Births ==
- Sun Sheng (or Anguo), Chinese historian (d. 373)

== Deaths ==
- Cao Huan, Chinese emperor of the Cao Wei state (b. 246)
- Narseh (or Narses), ruler of the Sassanid Empire
- Sima Jiong (or Jingzhi), Chinese prince and regent
