= 301 =

301 in various calendars
- Gregorian calendar: 301; CCCI
- Ab urbe condita: 1054
- Assyrian calendar: 5051
- Balinese saka calendar: 222–223
- Bengali calendar: −293 – −292
- Berber calendar: 1251
- Buddhist calendar: 845
- Burmese calendar: −337
- Byzantine calendar: 5809–5810
- Chinese calendar: 庚申年 (Metal Monkey); 2998 or 2791 — to — 辛酉年 (Metal Rooster); 2999 or 2792
- Coptic calendar: 17–18
- Discordian calendar: 1467
- Ethiopian calendar: 293–294
- Hebrew calendar: 4061–4062
- Hindu calendars
- Vikram Samvat: 357–358
- Shaka Samvat: 222–223
- Kali Yuga: 3401–3402
- Holocene calendar: 10301
- Iranian calendar: 321 BP – 320 BP
- Islamic calendar: 331 BH – 330 BH
- Javanese calendar: 181–182
- Julian calendar: 301; CCCI
- Korean calendar: 2634
- Minguo calendar: 1611 before ROC 民前1611年
- Nanakshahi calendar: −1167
- Seleucid era: 612/613 AG
- Thai solar calendar: 843–844
- Tibetan calendar: ལྕགས་ཕོ་སྤྲེ་ལོ་ (male Iron-Monkey); 427 or 46 or −726 — to — ལྕགས་མོ་བྱ་ལོ་ (female Iron-Bird); 428 or 47 or −725

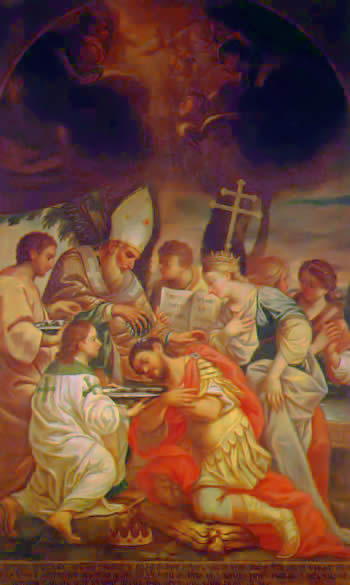
Baptism of King Tiridates III (the Great)

Year 301 (CCCI) was a common year starting on Wednesday of the Julian calendar. At the time, it was known as the Year of the Consulship of Postumius and Nepotianus (or, less frequently, year 1054 Ab urbe condita). The denomination 301 for this year has been used since the early medieval period, when the Anno Domini calendar era became the prevalent method in Europe for naming years.

== Events ==
=== By place ===
==== Roman Empire ====
- Caesar Galerius begins a major war against the Carpi and Bastarnae and wins the first of several victories.
- September: Emperor Diocletian issues a reform that revalues the Roman currency.
- November: Diocletian issues his Edict on Maximum Prices, which, rather than halting rampant inflation, causes widespread panic and an increase in inflation. The measure is quickly abandoned.

==== Armenia ====
- King Tiridates III (the Great) proclaims Christianity as the official state religion, making Armenia the first nation to adopt Christianity as its official religion (traditional date). Construction of the original Etchmiadzin Cathedral by Gregory the Illuminator begins.

==== Europe ====
- September 3 – The republic of San Marino is established (approximate date).

==== Asia ====
- February 3 – May 30 – Sima Lun briefly usurps the Jin Dynasty.

== Births ==
- Xie Ai, Chinese general of the Former Liang state (d. 354)

== Deaths ==
- June 5 – Sima Lun, Chinese usurper (forced suicide)
- Sun Xiu (or Junzhong), Chinese official and politician
