= Rima Pipoyan =

Armenian choreographer, dancer

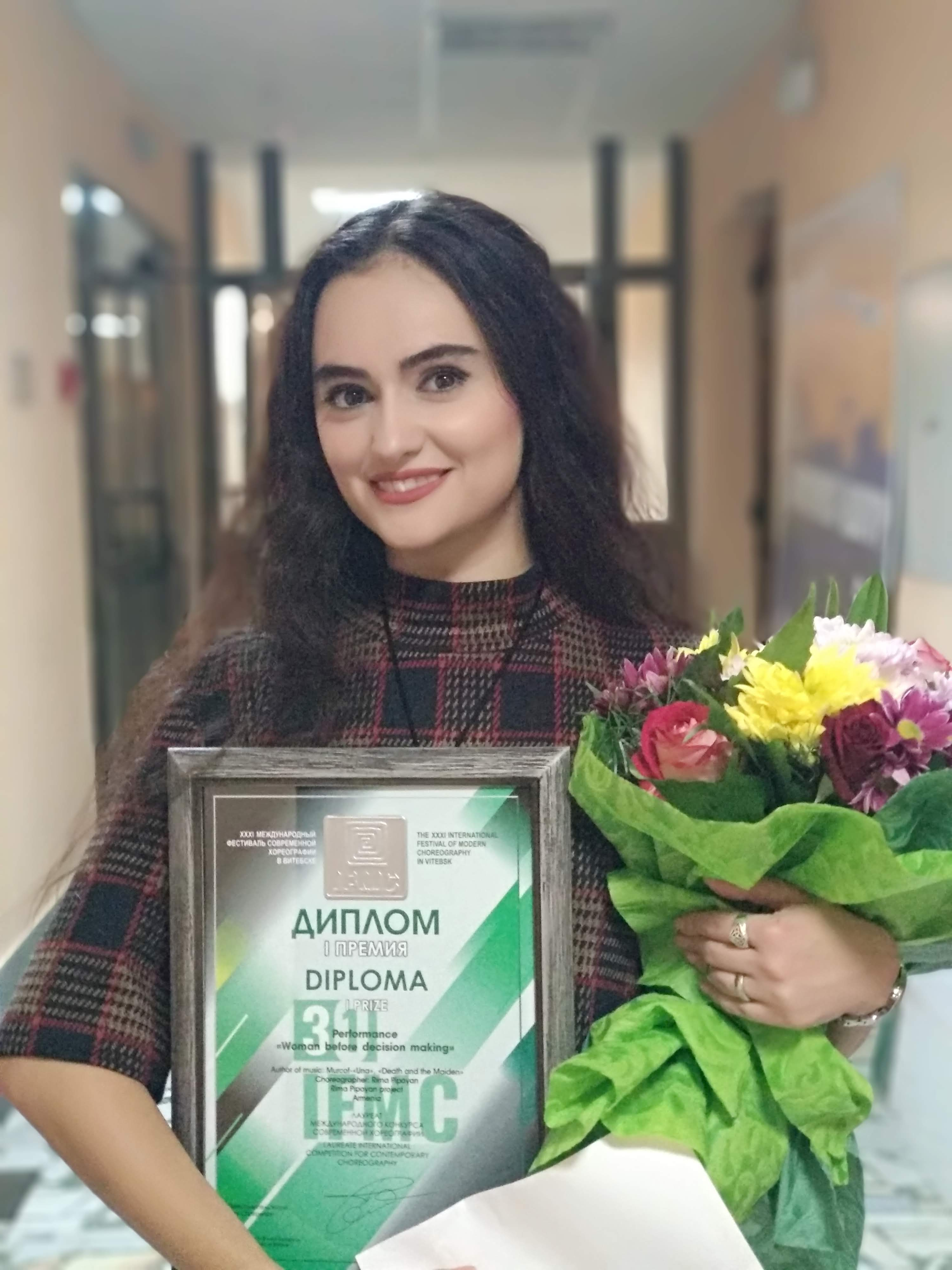
- Rima Pipoyan 2018
- Born: 2 June 1988 (age 38); Yerevan, Armenia
- Citizenship: Armenian
- Education: Yerevan State Choreographic college and Yerevan State Institute of Theatre and Cinematography
- Occupations: Choreographer, Director, Dancer, Dance Teacher
- Employer(s): Choreography Development Foundation, Yerevan State Choreographic college, Yerevan State Institute of Theatre and Cinematography, Anania Shirakatsy Lyceum and Armenian State Pedagogical University
- Style: Modern ballet, Contemporary Dance, Martial Arts
- Website: rimapipoyan.com rimapipoyan.dance

Rima Pipoyan (Armenian: Ռիմա Պիպոյան, 2 June 1988) is an Armenian choreographer, director, dancer and dance teacher. She is considered to be one of the pioneers of modern ballet and contemporary dance in Armenia. In 2017 she has found "Choreography development" educational and cultural foundation aiming to support the development of contemporary dance and modern ballet in Armenia. Since 2020, she has been the head of the Modern Dance Department at the Yerevan State Choreographic College. In 2014, under her artistic direction, the Rima Pipoyan Dance Company was founded. The company's members are young professional contemporary dancers who graduated from the Modern Dance Department. Pipoyan has presented her choreographic works in Switzerland, Italy, Spain, Portugal, Serbia, Croatia, Russia, Germany, Poland, Moldova, Belgium, Portugal, etc.

== Biography ==
=== Education ===
Pipoyan has begun her artistic path as a ballet dancer. In 1997 she was enrolled at the Yerevan State Choreographic college in the Department of Classical dance. Being a student at the Choreographic college Rima has been involved in the choreographic works of Maxim Martirosyan as a dancer. In 2006 she graduated from the college as a dance teacher with honors.

As a choreographer, Pipoyan started her career early at age 16. In 2005 she was enrolled at the Yerevan State Institute of Theatre and Cinematography studying choreography curated by Armenian ballet dancer, ballet master and People's Artist of the RSFSR Vilen Galstyan. In 2010 she graduated from the Institute receiving bachelor's degree in choreography with honors. During the period of her study at the institute (2005–2010) Pipoyan was cooperating with people from different spheres, with different backgrounds: actors, dancers, filmmakers or singers, she began writing her own plays, which were successful enough to be performed on big stages of international festivals. At the time she was already getting offers from several theaters. Being a student Pipoyan also started learning martial arts, in particular: Chinese wushu which would have impact on her choreographic style in the future

In 2007 she staged her first full-length modern ballet performance "That's by falling that we rise". In 2010 Pipoyan created her second full-length modern ballet performance "Medieval images" which was her diploma thesis representing various themes of Medieval Armenia on the music by Komitas, Avet Terteryan and Armenian medieval sacred songs called sharakan. The choreographic language of the performance was multiform: mixture of ballet, modern dance, martial arts and Armenian medieval gestures, positions and movements depicted in Armenian miniatures taken by Pipoyan from ancient Armenian books.

From 2010 to 2012 Pipoyan was studying for a master's degree at the Yerevan State Institute of Theatre and Cinematography receiving a diploma with honors in Master of Arts as a choreographer. Her master's thesis was on modern dance: its origins, its pioneers, its features, and on the importance of learning modern dance in professional dance institutions.
Pipoyan has enriched her knowledge in dance by receiving master classes and workshops from choreographers, dancers and dance companies around the world such as Akram Khan, Candoco Dance Company, Jochen Heckmann, Denise Lampart, "The LaborGras" company, Romain Guion, and Spellbound contemporary ballet.

=== Teaching experience ===
2007–2009 Pipoyan worked as a classical dance teacher at Anania Shirakatsy Lyceum.

2008–2016 she taught classical dance, characteristic and historical dances, and starting from 2016 she is teaching choreography at Yerevan State Choreographic College.

2010–2013 Pipoyan collaborated with the Shant TV channel as a jury member and a choreographer for the TV show program called So You Think You Can Dance. During the 3 seasons of the show program which was an Armenian version of American TV series, Pipoyan has created more than 30 dance sequences as a choreographer.

2011–2012 Pipoyan was working as a choreographer and a dancer at Yerevan State Choreography Theater.

2012–2019 she taught dance and curated the course of Choreography Directing at her Alma mater-Yerevan State Institute of Theatre and Cinematography.

In 2017 she founded "Choreography development" educational and cultural foundation the mission of which is to support development of choreography, contemporary dance and modern ballet in Armenia as well as to promote emerging choreographers, directors, dancers and dance teachers to develop their own creative, educational and cultural projects in Armenia.

From 2018 she has been a lecturer of Modern Dance at the Chair of Choreographic Pedagogy at the Armenian State Pedagogical University.

Since 2020 she has been the head of the chair of the Modern Dance Department at Yerevan State Choreographic College. The department was created on her initiation.

=== Professional activity ===
Pipoyan is one of the first Armenian based choreographers who managed to represent her choreographic works and stage performances abroad. Since 2013 the choreographic works of Pipoyan started appearing in different dance festivals and contests, she started receiving invitations and collaborative proposals from foreign countries as a choreographer and dancer.

In 2013 she received an invitation from South Caucasus Contemporary Dance and Experimental Art Festival in Tbilisi to stage a dance performance. The festival was initiated and organized by the Swiss Agency for Development and Cooperation and "Platform for Changes”. In the frame of the festival Pipoyan has created "La Vita Nuova" modern dance performance based on Variations on Dante Alighieri's "New Life" and on the music by Philip Glass. The world premier of the performance was held at the "Royal district" theater in Tbilisi 2013.

In 2015 with the support of the South Caucasus Contemporary Dance and Experimental Art Festival and with The Ministry of Culture of Armenia Pipoyan staged a repertory modern ballet performance "Sinful passions" at Armenian National Academic Theatre of Opera and Ballet. The modern ballet performance on the symphonies by L.V. Beethoven's was based on the life story of the Princess Tarakanova. The libretto for the ballet was written by Pipoyan and the character of the Princess Tarakanova was embodied by the Honored Artist of Armenia and the principal ballet dancer of the Armenian National Academic Theatre of Opera and Ballet Maria Divanyan.

In 2016–2017 Pipoyan was a fellowship holder as a choreographer at the Academy of Arts in Berlin (German: Akademie der Künste). During the year of her artistic residency in Berlin Pipoyan collaborated with various artists: painters, composers, architectures, designers etc., and organized "open doors" presentation days at the academy where she had appeared as a dancer and choreographer. As a final result of her fellowship Pipoyan staged "Hey, Kitty!" solo-film performance based on Anna Frank's diary. After the premiere in Berlin 2017 the performance has been performed in Armenia, Croatia, Italy, Moldova.

Pipoyan's "Woman before decision making" solo performance interpreting by herself has been created in 2018 and has been performed in more than 30 cities of almost 10 European countries. The solo performance has been presented in festivals and contests such as Stuttgart Solo Dance Contest in Germany, Unit Motives international festival in Greece, Gdansk international Solo Dance Festival in Poland, Cortoindanza international Dance festival in Sardinia, Italy, Quinzena De Dança de Almada in Portugal, 23Masdanza international contemporary dance festival in Canary Islands, Spain, Vitebsk international choreography festival in Belarus,"Cortoindanza Logos 2019" international festival, Cagliari, Sardinia, Italy, TanzArt Festival, Eupen, Belgium, Venice Biennale 2019, Venice, Italy, Highfest International performing arts festival Yerevan, Armenia, etc. Her dance in "Woman before decision making" was described as consistent and fine-tuned; so different and so unlike the techniques realized by everyone in the world. Her energy and strength...

In 2019 Pipoyan was among three young choreographers who was invited to Venice Biennale to stage a dance performance with 7 professional dancers from around the world. During her artistic residency in Venice in the frame of "Biennale College Choreographers" project Pipoyan staged "What if" dance performance the world premiere of which was at the Teatro Piccolo Arsenale in Venice.

In 2020 she became "East-West Residents" holder as a choreographer awarded by Creative Armenia.

In 2020, under the leadership of Rima Pipoyan, the Modern Dance department has been opened at the Yerevan State Choreographic College.

In 2021 on the initiative of Rima Pipoyan a new dance collaboration project was launched between Armenia and Ukraine. The main idea of realization of the project was to create long-life and reliable cultural partnership between Armenia and Ukraine. During the implementation of the project ten or more master classes were organized for the students of the classical dance department and the Armenian folk department of the State Choreographic College. Ukrainian dance classes were conducted by Vladyslav Bondar, a ballet soloist at the Kyiv Academic Opera and Ballet Theater. One of the highlights of the project was the creation of the dance performance "Me, My non-Self and I" by Rima Pipoyan.

In 2022, Rima became an Aerowaves choreographer with her choreographic work "Me, My non-Self and I" which was also invited to perform at the Internationale Maifestspiele Wiesbaden.

== Choreographic works ==
Year	Title	Premiere Venue	Music	Genre	Functions
2025	ICON	Moscow, St. Petersburg	Sergey Umroyan	Ballet	Idea and choreography: Rima Pipoyan, Performance: Context Diana Vishneva
2024	"Bone", "Mourning Women" and "Khali" (Armenian rug)	Stanislavski Russian Theatre of Yerevan	Hayk Karoyi, Sergey Umroyan	Contemporary Dance Performances	Idea and choreography: Rima Pipoyan, Performance: Rima Pipoyan Dance Company
2024	12 Proverbs	Sundukyan State Academic Theatre	J.S. Bach, Marin Marai, Henry Purcell, Hildegard von Bingen, Alva Noto	Performance	Idea and choreography
2023	Anatomy of Emotions	Bern Theatre	Ludwig van Beethoven Gustav Mahler	Ballet	Choreographer
2023	Solo for Two	N/A	Alexandr Iradyan	Installation project	Idea and Performance
2023	REEK	online	Alexandr Iradyan	Short Dance Film	Idea and Performance
2023	I am nobody, who are you?	Yerevan	Henry Purcell Dido and Aeneas	Modern Dance Performance	Idea and Choreography
2022	Chaconne in "K" existence	World premiere in Plovdiv and Sofia	Sergey Umroyan	Dance Performance	Artistic Residency, Idea and Choreography
2022	"Based on a True Story"	Germany, Begehungen Festival	Alexander Iradyan	Solo dance performance	Artistic Residency, Choreography and Dance
2021	"Me, My non-Self and I"	Croatia, Zagreb (online)	Alva Noto, Levon Minassian	Dance Performance	Director, Concept, Choreography and Dance
2020	"YEL"	online	Komitas	Short Dance Film	Director, Concept, Choreography and Dance
2019	"Self-portrait"	Germany-Belgium	Luc Ferrari, P.I.Tchaikovsky	Solo performance	Choreography, Dance
2019	"What if"	TEATRO PICCOLO ARSENALE, Venice, Italy	J.S. Bach	Dance Performance	Artistic Residency, Choreography, Idea, Libretto, Costume design
2018	"Woman before decision making"	Stuttgart, Germany	Murcof	Solo performance	Choreography, Dance
2017	"Hey, Kitty!"	Academy of Arts, Berlin, Germany	Anna Segal, Elena Rykova	Dance-Film Performance	Artistic Residency, Choreography, Dance, Idea, Libretto, Scenario, Costume design
2017	"Blessed"	National Theatre in Belgrade, Serbia	Komitas	Duet	Choreography
2016	"Hours of Vision"	Rustaveli Theatre, Tbilisi, Georgia	Alan Hovhaness, Arno Babajanyan	Dance Performance	Choreography, Dance
2016	"Triptych"	Electrotheatre Stanislavsky, Moscow, Russia	Komitas, Avet Terteryan	Dance Performance	Choreography, Idea, Libretto, Costume design
2015	"Sinful passions"	Armenian National Academic Theatre of Opera and Ballet, Yerevan, Armenia	Ludwig van Beethoven	Ballet	Choreography, Idea, Libretto,
2013	"La Vita Nuova"	"Royal District" Theatre, Tbilisi, Georgia	Philip Glass	Dance Performance	Choreography, Dance, Idea, Libretto, Costume design
2010	"Medieval Images"	Hamazgayin State Theater, Yerevan, Armenia	Komitas, Avet Terteryan, Armenian Medieval Sacred Songs	Modern ballet performance	Choreography, Dance, Idea, Libretto
2007	"It's by falling that we rise"	Hamazgayin State Theater, Yerevan, Armenia	Tan Dun	Dance Performance	Choreography, Dance, Idea, Libretto, Costume design

== Awards ==
Year	Name	Prize	Country	Notes
2022	ContextAir	Artistic residency	Plovdiv, Bulgaria	awarded as a choreographer
2022	Begehungen Festival	Artistic residency	Chemnitz, Germany	awarded as a choreographer
2022	Dance Spotlight	Best Film	Slovenia	YEL Dance film
2022	Tanzkongress	Scholarship	Mainz, Germany	awarded as a choreographer
2021	X World Short Film Festival	Best Director	Rome, Italy	YEL Dance film
2021	Vesuvius International Film Fest	Best Director	Campania, Italy	YEL Dance film
2021	Hollywood International Golden Age Film Festival	Best Dance	New York, USA	YEL Dance film
2020	London International Web and Shorts Film Festival	Honorable Mention	London, UK	YEL Dance film
2020	East-West Resident, Creative Armenia	Artistic residency	Brussels, Belgium	awarded as a choreographer
2019	Project-Laboratory Insomnia	Artistic residency	Santander, Cantabria, Spain	awarded as a dancer, choreographer for her "Woman before decision making" performance
2019	Biennale Dance College	Artistic residency	Venice, Italy	awarded as a choreographer
2019	Ministry of Culture of Armenia	Diploma of Honor	Yerevan, Armenia	given for her conscientious work in the field of dance
2018	International Festival of Modern Choreography IFMC	1st prize	Vitebsk, Belarus	given as a choreographer for her "Woman before decision making" performance
2018	Masdanza international contemporary dance festival	Artistic residency at Auditorio de Tenerife	Canary Islands, Spain	awarded as a choreographer for her "Woman before decision making" performance
2018	Gdansk International Dance Contest Festival	3rd Prize and Public award	Gdańsk, Poland	given as a choreographer for her "Woman before decision making" performance
2017	Global Fest International Dance festival-contest	1st prize	Moscow, Russia	given as a choreographer for her "Blessed" duet dance sequence
2017	Choreographic miniature contest	3rd prize	Belgrade, Serbia	given as a choreographer for her "Blessed" duet dance sequence
2017	Global Fest International Dance festival-contest	Grand Prix	Yerevan, Armenia	given as a choreographer for her "Blessed" duet dance sequence
2016	Academy of Arts, Berlin	Fellowship	Berlin, Germany	awarded as a choreographer
2015	DANCEformation Bremen	Artistic residency	Bremen, Germany	awarded as a choreographer and dancer
2008	International Traditional Wushu Competition	Gold medal	Yerevan, Armenia	style chang quan
