= Fadey Sargsyan =

Armenian scientist (1923–2010)

- Ֆադեյ Սարգսյան
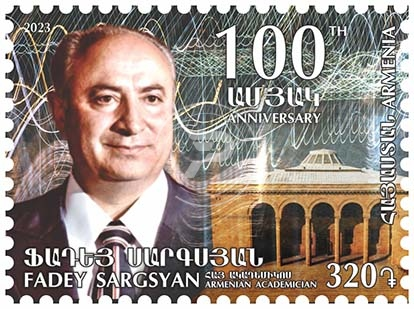
- Sargsyan on a 2023 stamp of Armenia

President of the Armenian National Academy of Sciences
- In office 1993–2006
- Preceded by: Viktor Ambartsumian
- Succeeded by: Radik Martirosyan

Chairman of the Council of Ministers of the Armenian Soviet Socialist Republic
- In office January 17, 1977 – January 16, 1989
- Preceded by: Grigory Arzumanyan
- Succeeded by: Vladimir Markaryants

Personal details
- Born: 18 September 1923 Yerevan, Armenian SSR, Soviet Union
- Died: 10 January 2010 (aged 86) Yerevan, Armenia
- Party: CPSU
- Occupation: Scientist, politician

Fadey Sargsyan (Armenian: Ֆադեյ Սարգսյան, September 18, 1923 – January 10, 2010) was an Armenian scientist and politician.

Sargsyan served as the Chairman of the Council of Ministers of the Armenian Soviet Socialist Republic from 1977 to 1989.

He was later the President of the Armenian National Academy of Sciences from 1993 to 2006.
